= Armand Gagné =

Adopted son of Louis XVI and Marie Antoinette

Armand Gagné (born François-Michel Gagné; 1771–1792), also known as Armand de Bourbon, was the adopted son (in practice: foster son) of King Louis XVI and Queen Marie Antoinette of France.

== Adoption ==
One day in 1776, Marie Antoinette's carriage came close to running over a five-year-old little boy on the road. The carriage stopped, and the boy was saved. The queen was informed by his legal guardian, his grandmother, that the boy was a poor orphan. Marie Antoinette became so delighted with his appearance that she decided to adopt him, and take him with her. She requested permission from his legal guardian to do so, and the grandmother agreed to the proposal.

The boy was not willing to go and did not wish to be taken away from his grandmother, but Marie Antoinette adopted him. This was not a formal adoption in the modern sense of the word, since the modern form of adoption did not exist at the time, but an informal form of fostering, which was common at the time.

The incident was described by Henriette Campan:

"A little village boy, four or five years old, full of health, with a pleasing countenance, remarkably large blue eyes, and fine light hair, got under the feet of the Queen’s horses, when she was taking an airing in a calash, through the hamlet of St. Michel, near Louveciennes. The coachman and postilions stopped the horses, and the child was rescued without the slightest injury. Its grandmother rushed out of the door of her cottage to take it; but the Queen, standing up in her calash and extending her arms, called out that the child was hers, and that destiny had given it to her, to console her, no doubt, until she should have the happiness of having one herself. “Is his mother alive?” asked the Queen. “No, Madame; my daughter died last winter, and left five small children upon my hands.” “I will take this one, and provide for all the rest; do you consent?” “Ah, Madame, they are too fortunate,” replied the cottager; “but Jacques is a bad boy. I hope he will stay with you!” The Queen, taking little Jacques upon her knee, said that she would make him used to her, and gave orders to proceed. It was necessary, however, to shorten the drive, so violently did Jacques scream, and kick the Queen and her ladies."

His grandmother was grateful to the queen for her financial assistance, which enabled her to provide for her family. His siblings also benefitted from the adoption: a musical education was financed for his brother Denis Gagné, who was employed as a cellist in the royal orchestra in 1787, and a dowry and monetary gifts were given to his sisters Louise Marie Gagné and Marie Madeleine Gagné until August 10, 1792.

== Life at court ==
Henriette Campan commented that the boy was unhappy about the adoption from the start, because he missed his biological family: "The arrival of Her Majesty at her apartments at Versailles, holding the little rustic by the hand, astonished the whole household; he cried out with intolerable shrillness that he wanted his grandmother, his brother Louis, and his sister Marianne; nothing could calm him. He was taken away by the wife of a servant, who was appointed to attend him as nurse."

Armand was the first child the King and Queen adopted, but he was not to be the last. He was followed by Ernestine Lambriquet in 1778, Jean Amilcar in 1787, and "Zoë" Jeanne Louise Victoire in 1790. Armand, Ernestine, and Zoë were the only ones among the Queen's foster children to actually live with the royal family, rather than just live at their expense.

The Queen called the boy, named François-Michel but called Jacques by his family, by the name Armand, which was the name of the son of her favourite, Madame de Polignac. Armand was consequently raised at the royal court. He was described as very spoiled by the Queen, and Campan described how "a white frock trimmed with lace, a rose-coloured sash with silver fringe, and a hat decorated with feathers, were now substituted for the woolen cap, the little red frock, and the wooden shoes." As with his foster sister Ernestine, who followed a couple of years later, he was a constant part of the intimate private life of the royal family, and was treated as one of them in private. The Queen, who during this period was tormented by the pressure to give birth to a child, reportedly found comfort in Gagnés' presence:

"The child was really very beautiful. The Queen was enchanted with him; he was brought to her every morning at nine o’clock; he breakfasted and dined with her, and often even with the King. She liked to call him my child, and lavished caresses upon him, still maintaining a deep silence respecting the regrets which constantly occupied her heart."

However, he was not a formal part of royal court life: he was not treated as a prince, and his presence at court was an informal one. He had been adopted against his will, was very unwilling to leave his grandmother, and appeared to have developed a bad relationship with his adoptive parents. According to the writings of Henriette Campan, the Queen no longer gave her adopted son as much attention after she had given birth to her first biological child, Marie-Thérèse, in 1778, noting that, "This child [Armand] remained with the Queen until the time when Madame [Marie Therese] was old enough to come home to her august mother."

== Military service ==
On the outbreak of the French Revolution of 1789, Gagné reportedly came to have republican sympathies. He joined the revolutionary army, and was killed in the Battle of Jemappes in November 1792.

Henriette Campan commented:

"This little unfortunate was nearly twenty in 1792; the fury of the people and the fear of being thought a favourite of the Queen’s had made him the most sanguinary terrorist of Versailles. He was killed at the battle of Jemappes."
