= Louis XVI =

King of France from 1774 to 1792

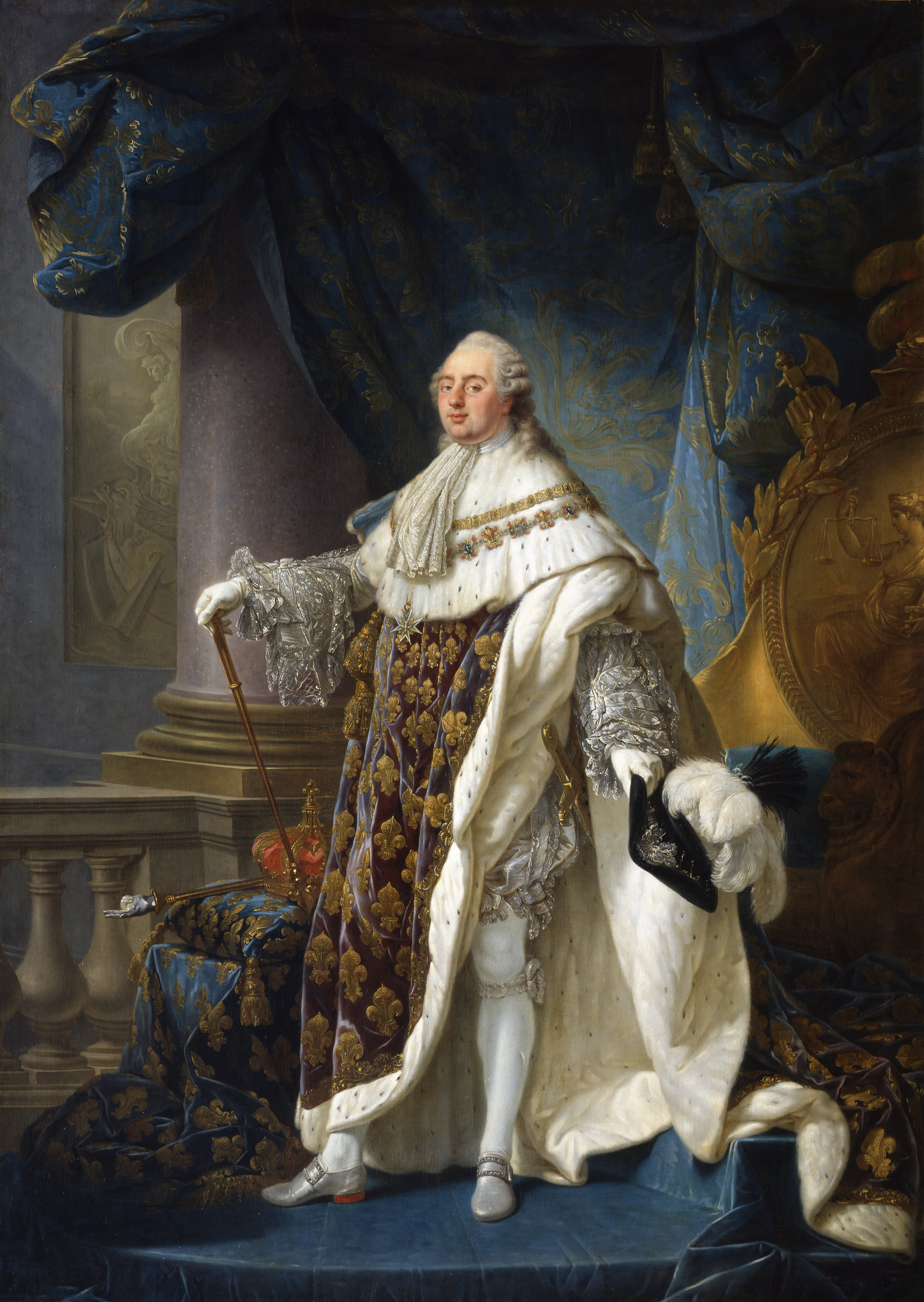
- Portrait of Louis XVI by Antoine-François Callet, c. 1779

King of France (Note: The style "King of the French" was decreed by the National Assembly on 9 November 1789, after a proposal approved on 10 October. The title was officialized in the French Constitution on 3 September 1791, which was ratified by the king on 14 September.)
- Reign: 10 May 1774 – 21 September 1792
- Coronation: 11 June 1775, Reims Cathedral
- Predecessor: Louis XV
- Chief ministers: See list: René Nicolas de Maupeou (1770–1774); Jacques Turgot (1774–1776); The Count of Maurepas (1776–1781); The Count of Vergennes (1781–1787); Étienne Charles de Loménie (1787–1788); Jacques Necker (1788–1789); The Baron of Breteuil (1789–1789); Jacques Necker (1789–1790); The Count of Montmorin (1790–1791)
- Born: Louis Auguste, Duke of Berry; 23 August 1754; Palace of Versailles, France
- Died: 21 January 1793 (aged 38); Place de la Révolution, Paris, France
- Cause of death: Execution by guillotine
- Burial: 21 January 1815; Basilica of St Denis
- Spouse: Marie Antoinette (m. 1770)
- Issue: Marie-Thérèse, Duchess of Angoulême; Louis Joseph, Dauphin of France; Louis XVII; Sophie
- House: Bourbon
- Father: Louis, Dauphin of France
- Mother: Maria Josepha of Saxony
- Religion: Roman Catholicism

Louis XVI (Louis-Auguste; French: [lwi sɛːz]; 23 August 1754 – 21 January 1793) was the last king of France before the fall of the monarchy during the French Revolution. The son of Louis, Dauphin of France (son and heir apparent of King Louis XV), and Maria Josepha of Saxony, Louis became the new Dauphin when his father died in 1765. In 1770, he married Austrian Archduchess Marie Antoinette. He became King of France and Navarre on his paternal grandfather's death on 10 May 1774, and reigned until the abolition of the monarchy on 21 September 1792. From 1791 onwards, he used the style of king of the French.

The first part of Louis XVI's reign was marked by attempts to reform the French government in accordance with Enlightenment ideas. These included efforts to increase tolerance toward non-Catholics as well as abolishing the death penalty for deserters. The French nobility reacted to the proposed reforms with hostility, and successfully opposed their implementation. Louis implemented deregulation of the grain market, advocated by his economic liberal minister Turgot, but it resulted in an increase in bread prices. In periods of bad harvests, it led to food scarcity which, during a particularly bad harvest in 1775, prompted the masses to revolt. From 1776, Louis XVI actively supported the North American colonists, who were seeking their independence from Great Britain, which was realised in the Treaty of Paris (1783). The ensuing debt and financial crisis contributed to the unpopularity of the ancien régime.

This led to the convening of the Estates General of 1789. Discontent among France's middle and lower classes intensified opposition to the French aristocracy and the absolute monarchy led by Louis XVI and his wife, Marie Antoinette. Tensions progressively rose, punctuated by violent riots such as the storming of the Bastille, which forced Louis to recognize the legislative authority of the National Assembly.

Louis's indecisiveness and conservatism toward the demands of the Estates led many to despise him as the embodiment of ancien régime tyranny, and his popularity deteriorated progressively. His unsuccessful flight to Varennes in June 1791 seemed to confirm suspicions that the king hoped for foreign intervention to restore his power, deeply undermining his legitimacy. Four months later, the constitutional monarchy was declared, and the replacement of the monarchy with a republic became an ever-increasing possibility. The growth of anti-clericalism among revolutionaries resulted in the abolition of the dîme (religious land tax) and several government policies aimed at the dechristianization of France.

With the outbreak of civil and international war, Louis XVI was arrested during the Insurrection of 10 August 1792. One month later, the monarchy was abolished and the French First Republic was proclaimed on 21 September 1792. The former king became a desacralized French citizen, addressed as Citoyen (Citizen) Louis Capet in reference to his ancestor Hugh Capet. Louis was tried by the National Convention (self-instituted as a tribunal for the occasion), found guilty of high treason, and executed by guillotine on 21 January 1793. Louis XVI's death brought an end to more than a thousand years of continuous French monarchy. Both of his sons died in childhood, before the Bourbon Restoration; his only child to reach adulthood, Marie Thérèse, was released to her Austrian relatives in exchange for French prisoners of war, eventually dying childless in 1851.

== Childhood ==
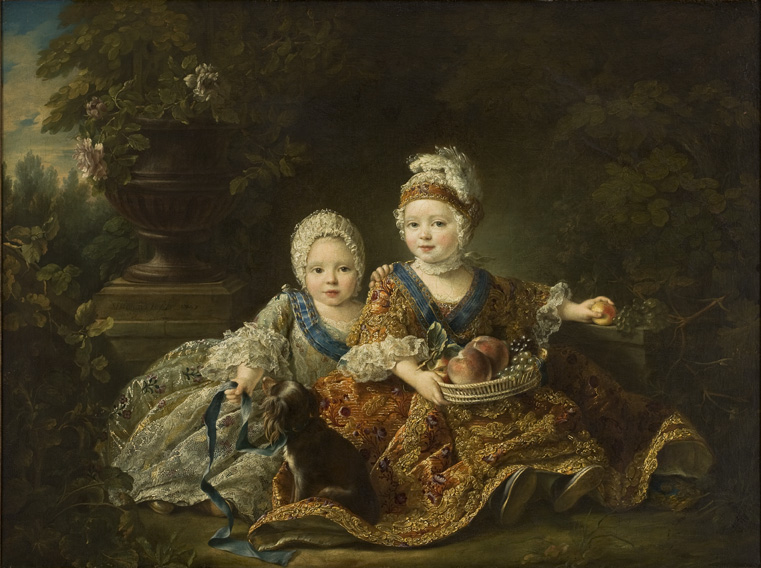
The young Duke of Berry (right) with his younger brother, the Count of Provence (by François-Hubert Drouais, 1757)

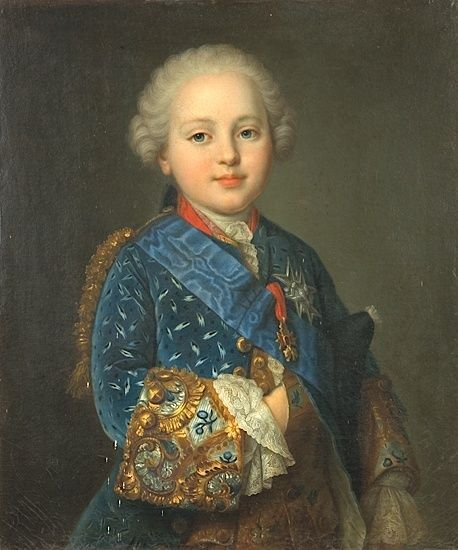
The young duke of Berry painted by Jean-Martial Frédou, c. 1760

Louis-Auguste de France, who was given the title Duke of Berry at birth, was born in the Palace of Versailles on 23 August 1754. One of seven children, he was the second surviving son of Louis, the Dauphin of France and the grandson of Louis XV, and of his consort, Maria Leszczyńska. His mother was Marie-Josèphe of Saxony, the daughter of Augustus III, Prince-elector of Saxony and King of Poland and Archduchess Maria Josepha of Austria.

Louis-Auguste was overlooked by his parents who favored his older brother, Louis, Duke of Burgundy, who was regarded as bright and handsome but died at the age of nine in 1761. Louis-Auguste, a strong and healthy boy but very shy, excelled in his studies and had a strong taste for Latin, history, geography, and astronomy and became fluent in Italian and English. His tutors in mathematics and physics had high praises for his work. Le Blonde, his mathematics instructor, wrote that the prince's studies were "proofs of [his] intelligence and the excellence of [his] judgement," though flattery was to be expected when addressing a prince. Louis-Auguste's apparent mathematical skills are corroborated by his enjoyment of cartography, which would have required an understanding of scale and projections. He also enjoyed physical activities such as hunting with his grandfather and rough play with his younger brothers, Louis-Stanislas, Count of Provence, and Charles-Philipe, Count of Artois. From an early age, Louis-Auguste was encouraged in another of his interests, locksmithing, which was seen as a useful pursuit for a child.

When his father died of tuberculosis on 20 December 1765, the eleven-year-old Louis-Auguste became the new Dauphin. His mother never recovered from the loss of her husband and died on 13 March 1767, also from tuberculosis. The strict and conservative education he received from Paul François de Quelen de la Vauguyon, "gouverneur des Enfants de France" (governor of the Children of France), from 1760 until his marriage in 1770, did not prepare him for the throne that he was to inherit in 1774 after the death of his grandfather, Louis XV. Throughout his education, Louis-Auguste received a mixture of studies particular to religion, morality, and humanities. His instructors may have also had a good hand in shaping Louis-Auguste into the indecisive king that he became. Abbé Berthier, his instructor, taught him that timidity was a value in strong monarchs, and Abbé Soldini, his confessor, instructed him not to let people read his mind.

== Marriage and family life ==
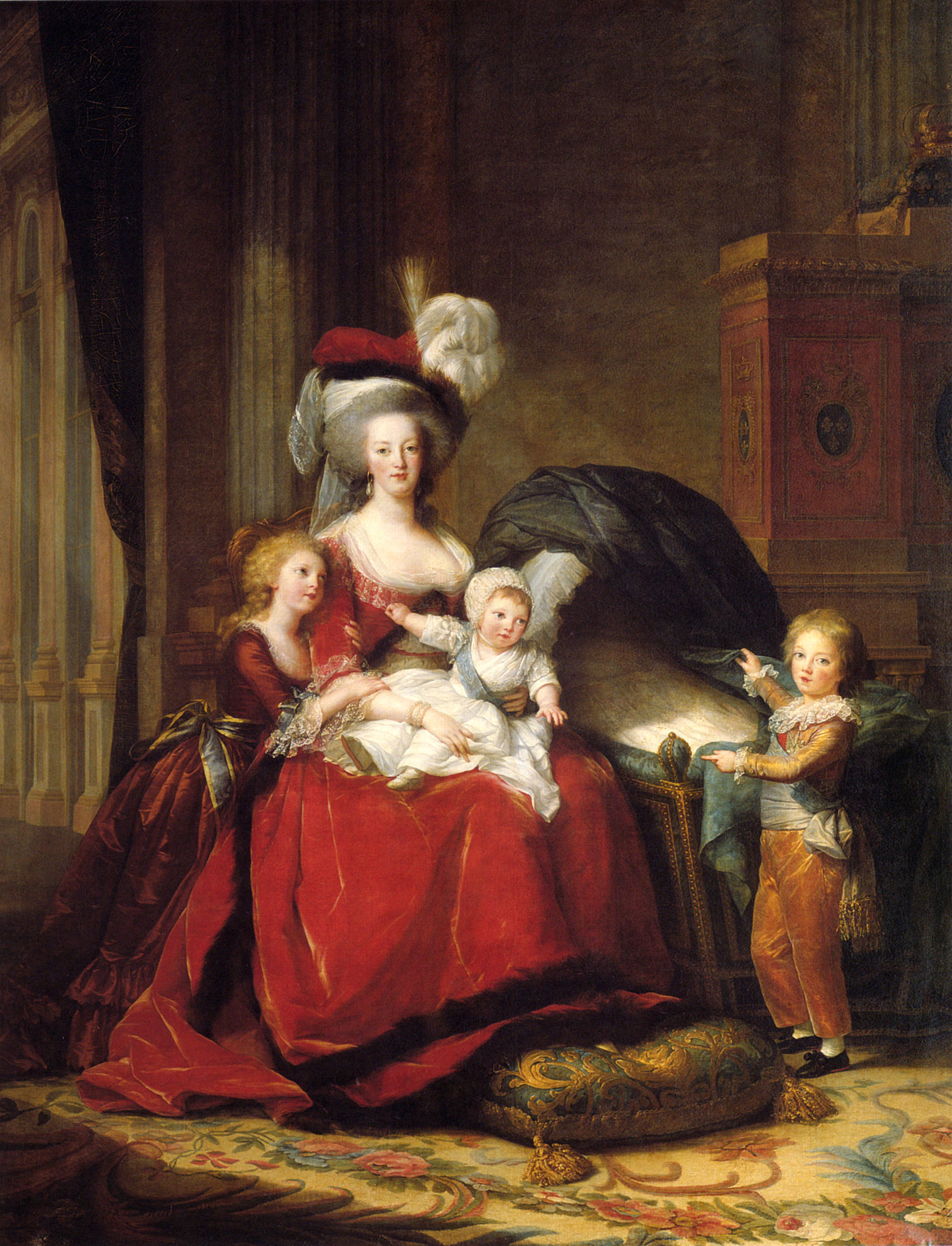
Marie Antoinette, queen of France and wife of Louis XVI, with their three eldest children, Marie Thérèse, Louis-Charles and Louis-Joseph (by Élisabeth Vigée-Lebrun, 1787)

On 19 April 1770, at the age of fifteen, Louis XVI married the fourteen-year-old Archduchess Maria Antonia of Austria, his second cousin once removed and the youngest daughter of Holy Roman Emperor Francis I and Empress Maria Theresa.

This marriage was met with hostility from the French public. France's alliance with its traditional enemy Austria had pulled the country into the disastrous Seven Years' War, in which it was defeated by the British and the Prussians, both in Europe and in North America. By the time that Louis XVI and Marie Antoinette were married, the French people generally disliked the Austrian alliance, and Marie Antoinette was seen as an unwelcome foreigner. For the young couple, the marriage was initially amiable but distant. Louis XVI's shyness and, among other factors, the young age and inexperience of the newlyweds (who were near total strangers to each other: they had met only two days before their wedding) meant that the fifteen-year-old bridegroom failed to consummate the union with his fourteen-year-old bride. His fear of being manipulated by her for Austrian purposes caused him to behave coldly towards her in public. Correspondence between Marie Antoinette's mother and Austria's French ambassador Florimond Claude, Comte de Mercy-Argenteau express a desire for Marie Antoinette to exercise authority in the French court and to encourage Louis XVI to dedicate more attention to his role as prince. To their disappointment, however, the princess did not seem overly interested in "serious affairs". Over time, the couple became closer, though while their marriage was reportedly consummated in July 1773, it did not actually happen until 1777.

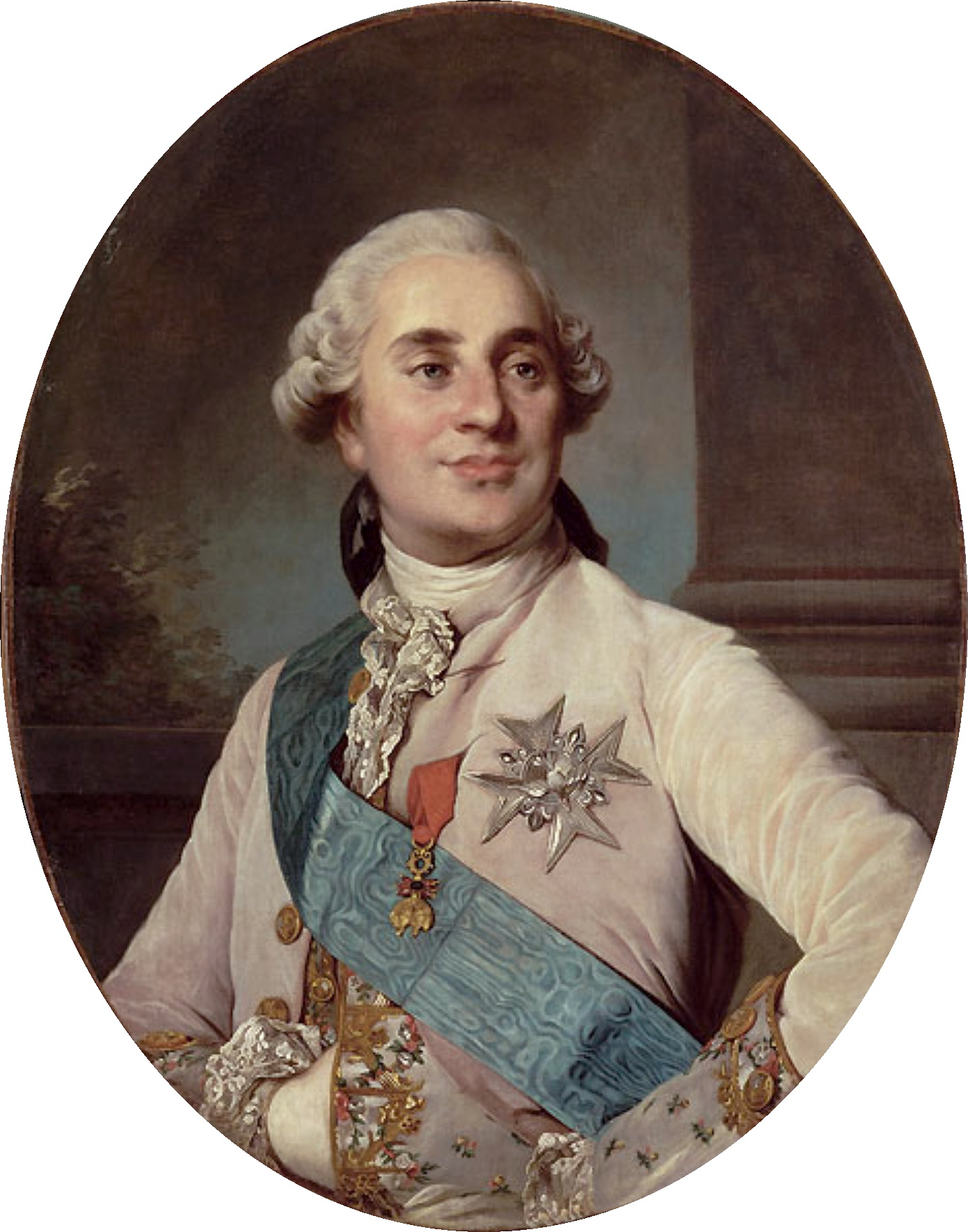
Louis XVI in early adulthood

The couple's failure to produce children for several years placed a strain upon their marriage, exacerbated by the publication of obscene pamphlets (libelles) mocking their infertility. One such pamphlet questioned, "Can the King do it? Can't the King do it?".

The couple's initial failure to have children aroused contemporary debate that has continued among historians. One suggestion is that Louis XVI suffered from a physical dysfunction, most often thought to be phimosis, a suggestion first made in late 1772 by the royal doctors. Adherents of this view suggest that he was circumcised (a common treatment for phimosis) to relieve the condition seven years after their marriage. Louis XVI's doctors were not in favour of the surgery – the operation was delicate and traumatic, and capable of doing "as much harm as good" to an adult man. The argument for phimosis and a resulting operation is mostly seen to originate from Stefan Zweig's 1932 biography of Marie Antoinette.

Most modern historians doubt that Louis XVI had surgery. As 1777, the Prussian envoy, Baron Goltz, reported that Louis XVI had definitely declined the operation. Louis XVI was frequently declared to be perfectly capable of sexual intercourse, as confirmed by Marie Antoinette's brother Joseph II; and during the time he was supposed to have had the operation, his journal records him hunting almost every day, which would not have been possible for weeks after circumcision. The couple's sexual problems are now attributed to other factors. Antonia Fraser's biography of Marie Antoinette discusses Joseph II's letter on the matter to one of his brothers after he visited Versailles in 1777. Joseph describes in frank detail Louis XVI's sexual inadequacy and Marie Antoinette's lack of interest. Joseph described the couple as "complete fumblers"; however, with Joseph's advice, Louis XVI began to apply himself more effectively, and in the third week of March 1778 Marie Antoinette became pregnant.

Eventually, the royal couple had four children. According to Jeanne-Louise-Henriette Campan, Marie Antoinette's lady-in-waiting, the queen also suffered two miscarriages. The first, in 1779, a few months after the birth of her first child, is mentioned by Empress Maria Theresa in a July letter to her daughter. Madame Campan states that Louis XVI spent an entire morning consoling his wife at her bedside, and swore everyone to secrecy. Marie Antoinette suffered a second miscarriage on the night of 2–3 November 1783.

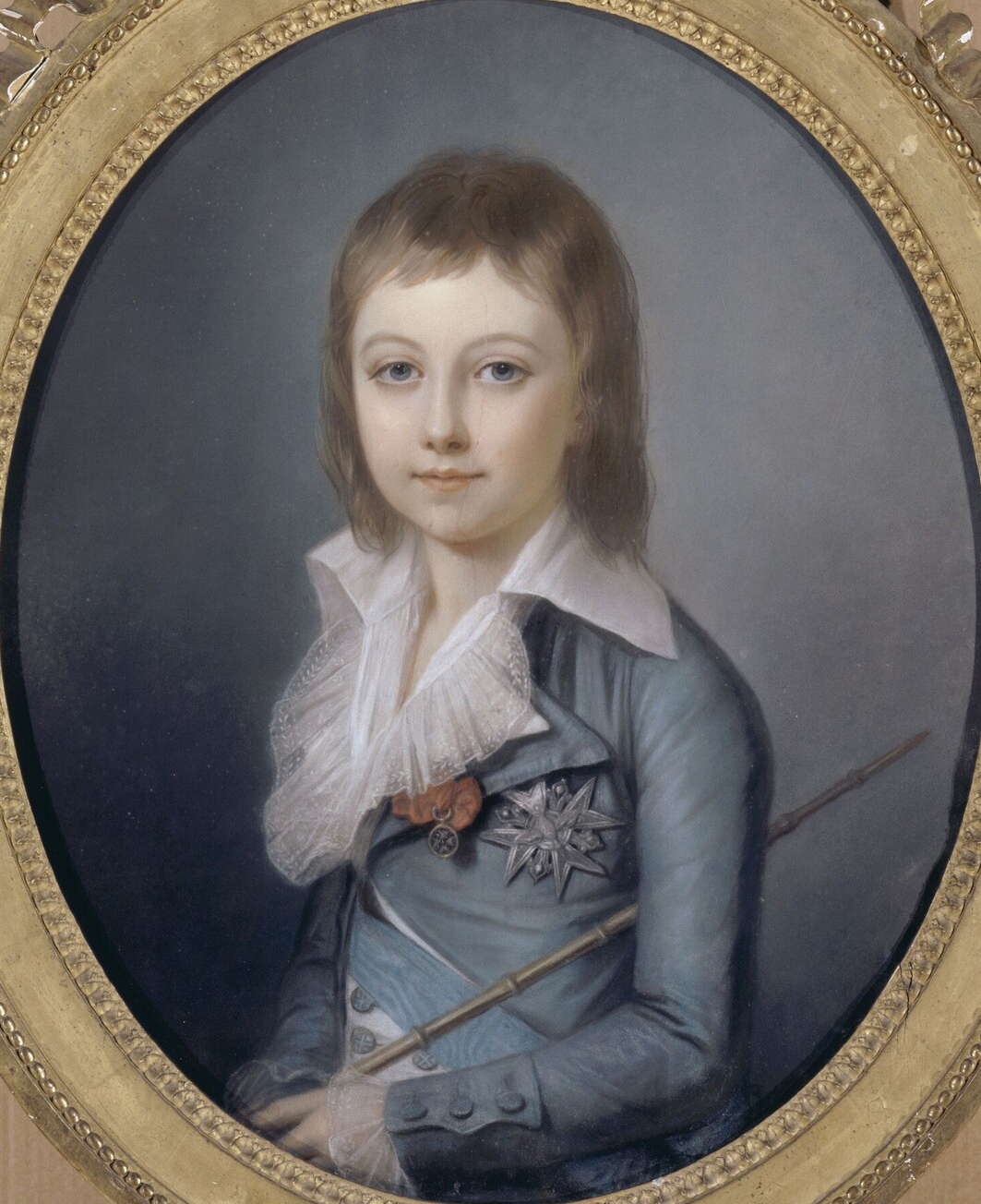
The 7 year-old Louis XVII (1792)

Their live-born children were:

- Marie-Thérèse-Charlotte (19 December 1778 – 19 October 1851)
- Louis-Joseph, Dauphin of France (22 October 1781 – 4 June 1789)
- Louis-Charles, Dauphin after the death of his elder brother, future titular King Louis XVII of France (27 March 1785 – 8 June 1795)
- Sophie-Hélène-Béatrix, died in infancy (9 July 1786 – 19 June 1787)

In addition to his biological children, Louis XVI also adopted six children: "Armand" Francois-Michel Gagné (c. 1771–1792), a poor orphan adopted in 1776; Jean Amilcar (c. 1781–1796), a Senegalese slave boy given to the queen by Stanislas de Boufflers in 1787, freed, baptized, adopted and placed in a pension; Ernestine Lambriquet (1778–1813), daughter of two servants at the palace, who was raised as the playmate of his daughter and whom he adopted after the death of her mother in 1788; and finally "Zoe" Jeanne Louise Victoire (born in 1787), who was adopted in 1790 along with her two older sisters after the death of her parents, an usher and his wife in service of the king.

Of these adoptees, only Armand, Ernestine and Zoe actually lived with the royal family: Jean Amilcar, along with the elder siblings of Zoe and Armand who were also formally foster children of the royal couple, lived at the queen's expense until her imprisonment, which proved fatal for at least Amilcar, who was evicted from his boarding school, and reportedly starved to death on the street. Armand and Zoe had a position which was more similar to that of Ernestine: Armand lived at court with the king and queen until the outbreak of the revolution, when he left them because of his republican sympathies, and Zoe was chosen to be the playmate of the Dauphin, just as Ernestine had once been selected as the playmate of Marie Thérèse, and sent away to her sisters in a convent boarding school before the Flight to Varennes in 1791.

== Absolute monarch of France (1774–1789) ==
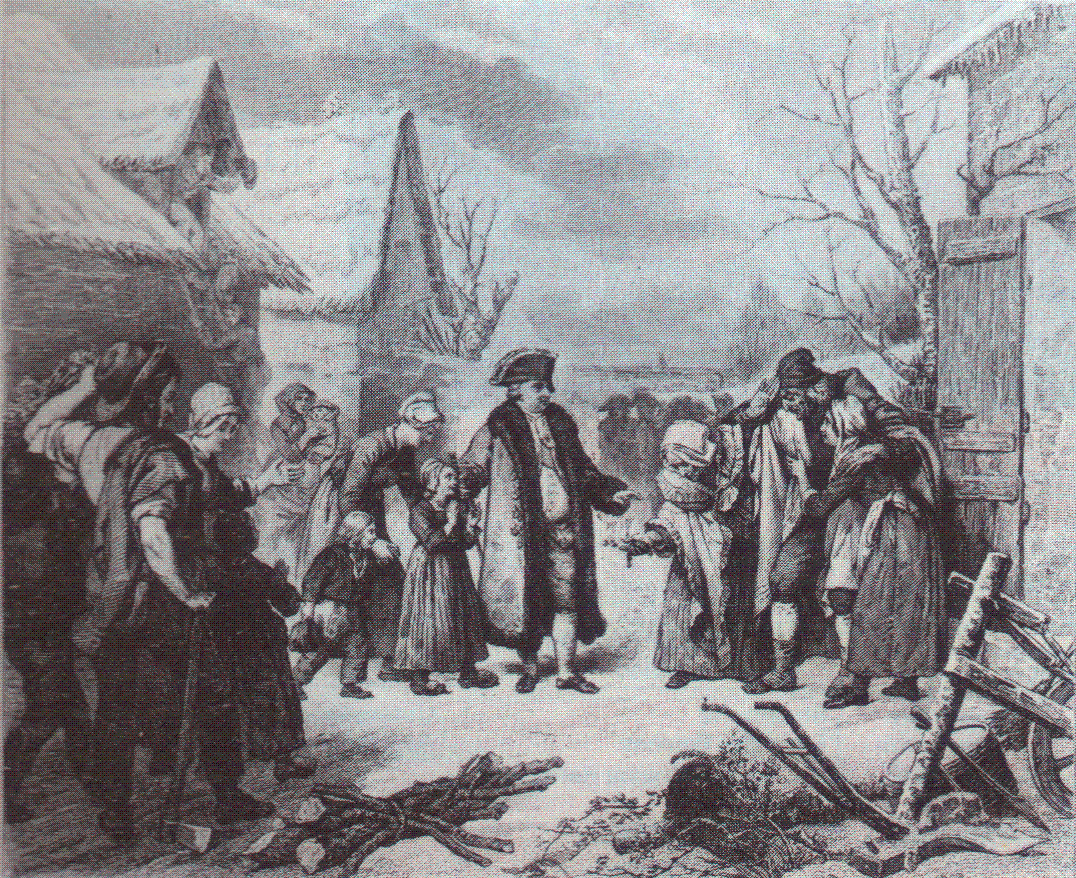
Louis XVI distributing money to the poor of Versailles, during the brutal winter of 1788

When Louis XVI ascended to the throne in 1774, he was nineteen years old. He had an enormous responsibility, as the government was deeply in debt, and resentment of despotic monarchy was on the rise. His predecessor, his grandfather Louis XV, had been widely hated by the time of his death. The public remembered him as an irresponsible man who spent his time womanizing rather than managing his kingdom. Furthermore, the monarchy had poured money into a series of unsuccessful foreign military campaigns, leaving France in financial difficulty. The young Louis XVI felt woefully unqualified to resolve the situation.

As king, Louis XVI focused primarily on religious freedom and foreign policy. Although raised as the Dauphin since 1765, he lacked firmness and decisiveness. His desire to be loved by his people is evident in the prefaces of many of his edicts that would often explain the nature and good intention of his actions as benefiting the people, such as reinstating the parlements. When questioned about his decision, he said, "It may be considered politically unwise, but it seems to me to be the general wish and I want to be loved." In spite of his indecisiveness, Louis XVI was determined to be a good king, stating that he "must always consult public opinion; it is never wrong." He, therefore, appointed an experienced advisor, Jean-Frédéric Phélypeaux, Count of Maurepas who, until his death in 1781, would take charge of many important ministerial functions.

Among the major events of Louis XVI's reign was his signing of the Edict of Versailles, also known as the Edict of Tolerance, on 7 November 1787, which was registered in the Parlement of Paris on 29 January 1788. Granting non-Roman Catholics – Huguenots and Lutherans, as well as Jews – civil and legal status in France and the legal right to practice their faiths, this edict effectively nullified the Edict of Fontainebleau that had been law for 102 years. The Edict of Versailles did not legally proclaim freedom of religion in France – this took two more years, with the Declaration of the Rights of Man and of the Citizen of 1789 – however, it was an important step in eliminating religious tensions and it officially ended religious persecution within his realm.

=== Economic policies ===
Radical financial reforms by Anne Robert Jacques Turgot and Guillaume-Chrétien de Lamoignon de Malesherbes angered the nobles and were blocked by the parlements who insisted that the King did not have the legal right to levy new taxes. So, in 1776, Turgot was dismissed and Malesherbes resigned, to be replaced by Jacques Necker. Necker supported the American Revolution, and he carried out a policy of taking out large international loans instead of raising taxes. He attempted to gain public favor in 1781 by publishing the first ever accounting of the French Crown's expenses and accounts, the Compte-rendu au Roi. This misleading publication led the people of France to believe the kingdom ran a modest surplus. When this policy of hiding and ignoring the kingdom's financial woes failed miserably, Louis dismissed and replaced him in 1783 with Charles Alexandre de Calonne, who increased public spending to "buy" the country's way out of debt. Again this failed, so Louis convoked the Assembly of Notables in 1787 to discuss a revolutionary new fiscal reform proposed by Calonne. When the nobles were informed of the true extent of the debt, they were shocked and rejected the plan.

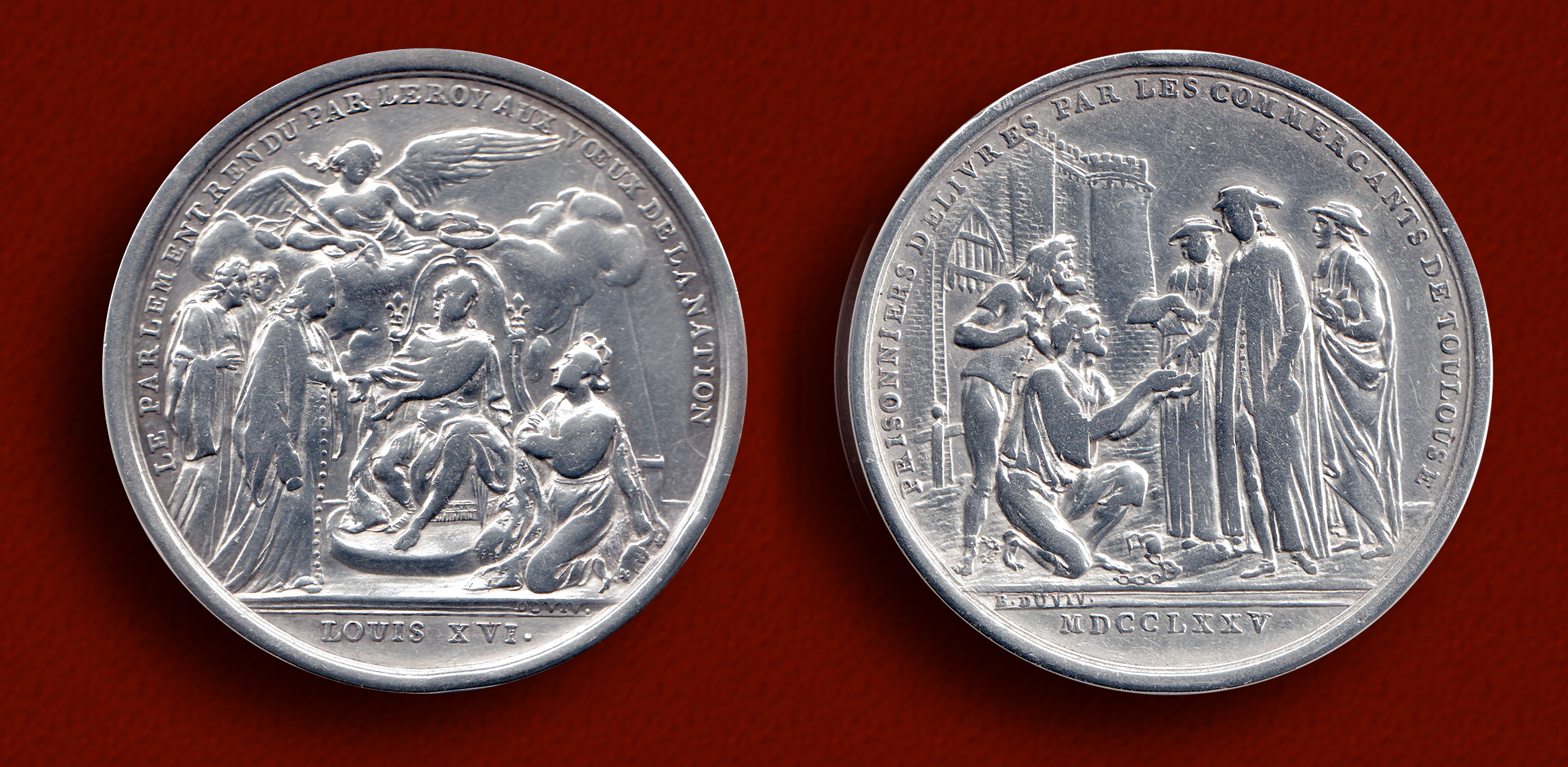
"Le Couronnement de Louis XVI", 18th century motif by Benjamin Duvivier, coins honouring the 11 June 1775 Coronation of Louis XVI

After this, Louis XVI and his new Controller-General of Finances, Étienne-Charles de Loménie de Brienne, tried to simply force the Parlement of Paris to register the new laws and fiscal reforms. Upon the refusal of the members of the Parlement, Louis XVI tried to use his absolute power to subjugate them by every means: enforcing in many occasions the registration of his reforms via Lit de justice (6 August 1787, 19 November 1787, and 8 May 1788), exiling all Parlement magistrates to Troyes as a punishment on 15 August 1787, prohibiting six members from attending parliamentary sessions on 19 November, arresting two very important members of the Parlement, who opposed his reforms, on 6 May 1788, and even dissolving and depriving of all power the "Parlement", replacing it with a plenary court, on 8 May 1788. The failure of these measures and displays of royal power is attributable to three decisive factors. First, the majority of the population stood in favor of the Parlement against the King, and thus continuously rebelled against him. Second, the royal treasury was financially destitute to a crippling degree, leaving it incapable of sustaining its own imposed reforms. Third, although the King enjoyed as much absolute power as his predecessors, he lacked the personal authority crucial for absolutism to function properly. Now unpopular with both the commoners and the aristocracy, Louis XVI was therefore only very briefly able to impose his decisions and reforms, for periods ranging from 2 to 4 months, before having to revoke them.

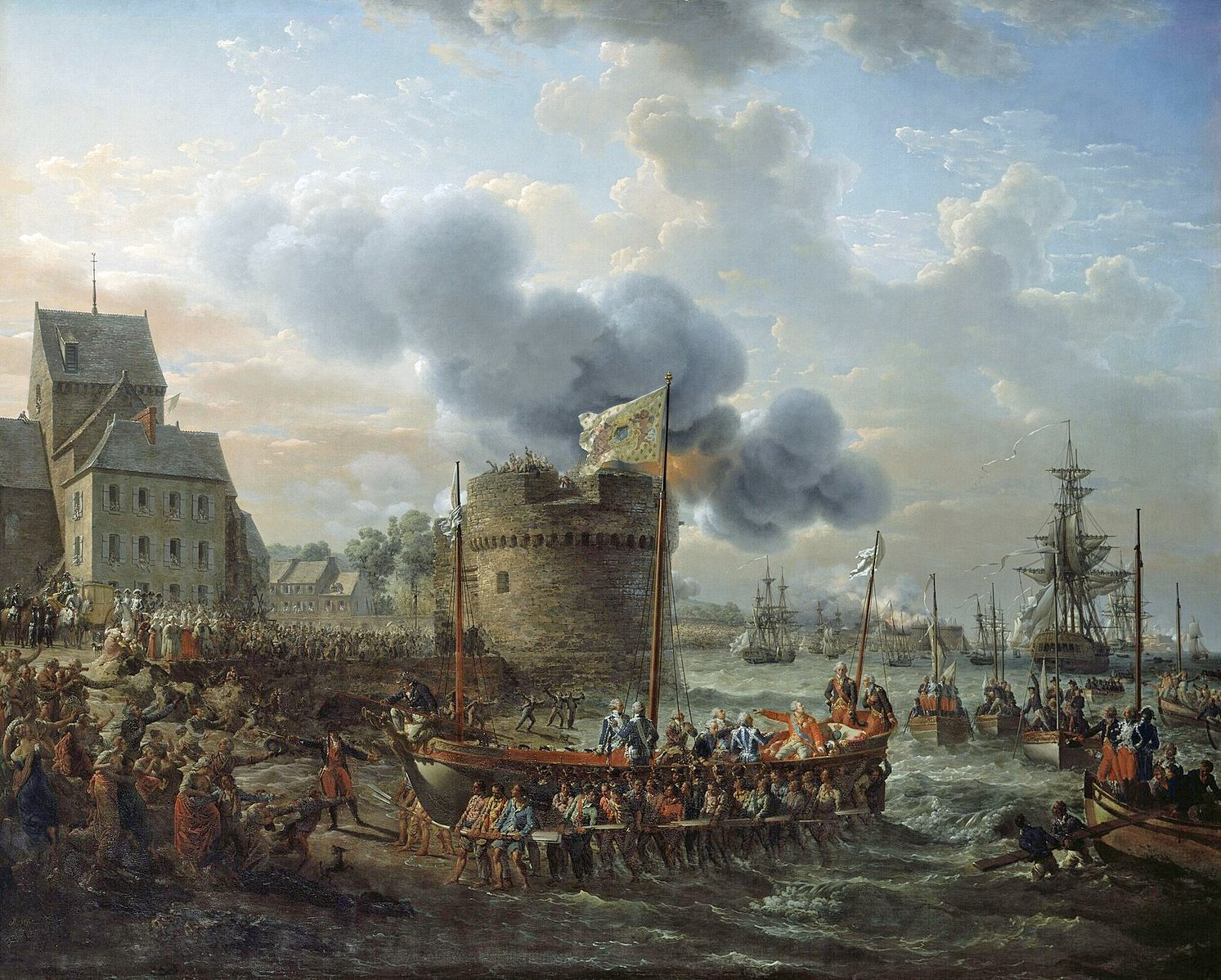
Louis XVI visiting Cherbourg in June 1786, on the occasion of the work to put in place a dike (1817 painting)

As authority dissipated from him and reforms were clearly becoming unavoidable, there were increasingly loud calls for him to convoke the Estates General, which had not met since 1614 (at the beginning of the reign of Louis XIII). As a last-ditch attempt to get new monetary reforms approved, Louis XVI convoked the Estates General on 8 August 1788, setting the date of their opening on 1 May 1789. With the convocation of the Estates General, as in many other instances during his reign, Louis XVI placed his reputation and public image in the hands of those who were perhaps not as sensitive to the desires of the French population as he was. Because it had been so long since the Estates General had been convened, there was some debate as to which procedures should be followed. Ultimately, the Parlement of Paris agreed that "all traditional observances should be carefully maintained to avoid the impression that the Estates General could make things up as it went along." Under this decision, the King agreed to retain many of the traditions which had been the norm in 1614 and prior convocations of the Estates General, but which were intolerable to a Third Estate (the bourgeoisie) buoyed by recent proclamations of equality. For example, the First and Second Estates (the clergy and nobility respectively) proceeded into the assembly wearing their finest garments, while the Third Estate was required to wear plain, oppressively somber black, an act of alienation that Louis XVI would likely have not condoned. He seemed to regard the deputies of the Estates General with respect: in a wave of self-important patriotism, members of the Estates refused to remove their hats in the King's presence, so Louis removed his to them.

This convocation was one of the events that transformed the general economic and political malaise of the country into the French Revolution. In June 1789, the Third Estate unilaterally declared itself the National Assembly. Louis XVI's attempts to control it resulted in the Tennis Court Oath (serment du jeu de paume), on 20 June, the declaration of the National Constituent Assembly on 9 July, and eventually to the storming of the Bastille on 14 July, which started the French Revolution. Within three short months, the majority of the King's executive authority had been transferred to the elected representatives of the Nation.

==== Royal spending ====
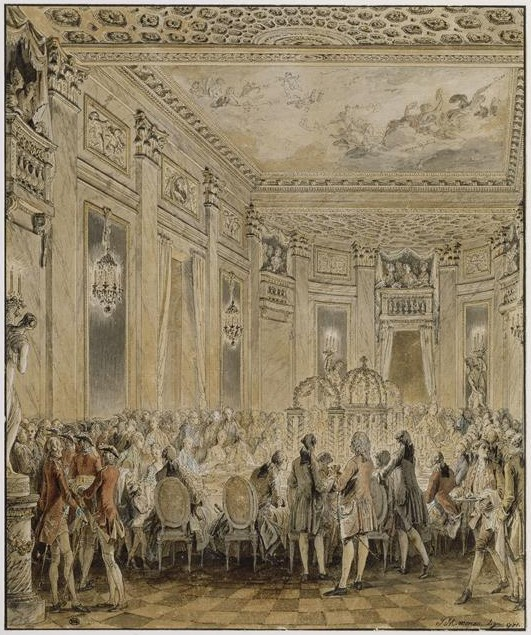
Jean-Michel Moreau – Souper donné à Louveciennes (1771)

The Menus-Plaisirs du Roi was under the direction of Papillon de la Ferté and he gave details in his journal about the costs of the performances over the years 1756–1780 in three different palaces. The wedding in 1771 was especially costly. The performance of Castor et Pollux in 1779 when he was visited by his brother-in-law, Joseph II, involved more than 500 people. Royal household spending in 1788 was 13% of total state expenses (excluding interest on debts).

== Foreign policy ==
French involvement in the Seven Years' War had left Louis XVI a disastrous inheritance. Britain's victories had seen them capture most of France's colonial territories. While some were returned to France at the Treaty of Paris (1763), almost all of New France was ceded to the British, or to France's Spanish allies to compensate them for losses to the British.

This had led to a strategy amongst the French leadership of seeking to rebuild the French military in order to fight a war of revenge against Britain, in which it was hoped the lost colonies could be recovered. France still maintained a strong influence in the West Indies, and in India maintained five trading posts, leaving opportunities for disputes and power-play with Great Britain.

=== Concerning the American Revolution and Europe ===
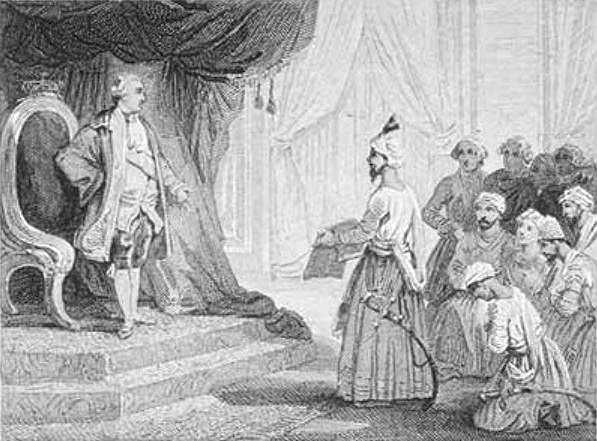
Louis XVI receiving the ambassadors of Tipu Sultan in 1788, Voyer after Emile Wattier, 19th century

In the spring of 1776, Charles Gravier, comte de Vergennes, the Minister for Foreign Affairs, saw an opportunity to humiliate France's long-standing enemy, Great Britain, and to recover territory lost during the Seven Years' War, by supporting the American Revolution. In the same year Louis was persuaded by Pierre Beaumarchais to send supplies, ammunition, and guns to the rebels secretly. Early in 1778 he signed a formal Treaty of Alliance, and later that year France went to war with Britain. In deciding in favor of war, despite France's large financial problems, the King was materially influenced by alarmist reports after the Battle of Saratoga, which suggested that Britain was preparing to make huge concessions to the Thirteen Colonies and then, allied with them, to strike at French and Spanish possessions in the West Indies. Spain and the Netherlands soon joined the French in an anti-British coalition. After 1778, Great Britain switched its focus to the West Indies, as defending the sugar islands was considered more important than trying to recover the Thirteen Colonies. France and Spain planned to invade the British Isles themselves with the Armada of 1779, but the operation never went ahead.

France's initial military assistance to the American rebels was a disappointment, with defeats at Rhode Island and Savannah. In 1780, France sent Jean-Baptiste Donatien de Vimeur, comte de Rochambeau and François Joseph Paul de Grasse to help the Americans, along with large land and naval forces. The French expeditionary force arrived in North America in July 1780. The appearance of French fleets in the Caribbean was followed by the capture of a number of the sugar islands, including Tobago and Grenada. In October 1781, the French naval blockade was instrumental in forcing a British army under Cornwallis to surrender at the Siege of Yorktown. When news of this reached London in March 1782, the North ministry fell and Great Britain immediately sued for peace terms; however, France delayed the end of the war until September 1783 in the hope of overrunning more British colonies in India and the West Indies.

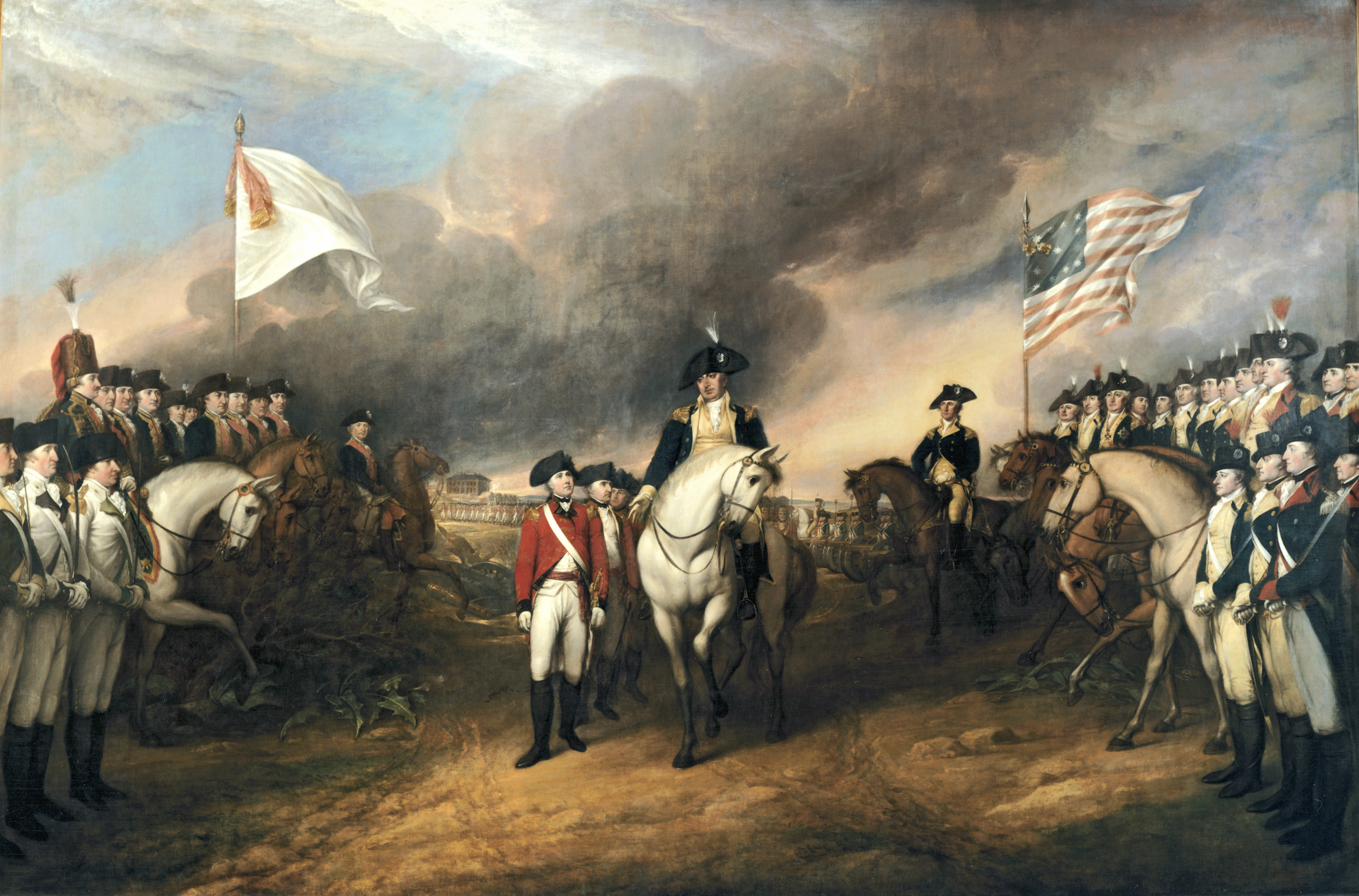
Surrender of Cornwallis to French (left) and American (right) troops, at the Siege of Yorktown in 1781 (by John Trumbull)

Great Britain recognized the independence of the Thirteen Colonies as the United States of America, and the French war ministry rebuilt its army. However, the British defeated the main French fleet in 1782 at the Battle of the Saintes and successfully defended Jamaica and Gibraltar. France gained little from the Treaty of Paris (1783) that ended the war, except the colonies of Tobago and Senegal. Louis XVI was wholly disappointed in his aims of recovering Canada, India, and other islands in the West Indies from Britain, as they were too well defended and the Royal Navy made any attempted invasion of mainland Britain impossible. The war cost 1,066 million livres, financed by new loans at high interest (with no new taxes). Necker concealed the crisis from the public by explaining only that ordinary revenues exceeded ordinary expenses, and not mentioning the loans. After he was forced from office in 1781, new taxes were levied.

This intervention in America was not possible without France adopting a neutral position in European affairs to avoid being drawn into a continental war which would be simply a repetition of the French policy mistakes in the Seven Years' War. Vergennes, supported by King Louis, refused to go to war to support Austria in the War of the Bavarian Succession in 1778, when the Queen's brother Joseph II, Holy Roman Emperor tried to partition Bavaria over a disputed inheritance. Vergennes and Maurepas refused to support the Austrian position, but the intervention of Marie Antoinette in favor of Austria obliged France to adopt a position more favorable to Austria, which in the Treaty of Teschen was able to get in compensation the Innviertel, a territory whose population numbered around 100,000 persons. However, this intervention was a disaster for the image of the Queen, who was named "l'Autrichienne" (a pun in French meaning "Austrian", but the "chienne" suffix can mean "bitch") on account of it.

=== Concerning Asia ===
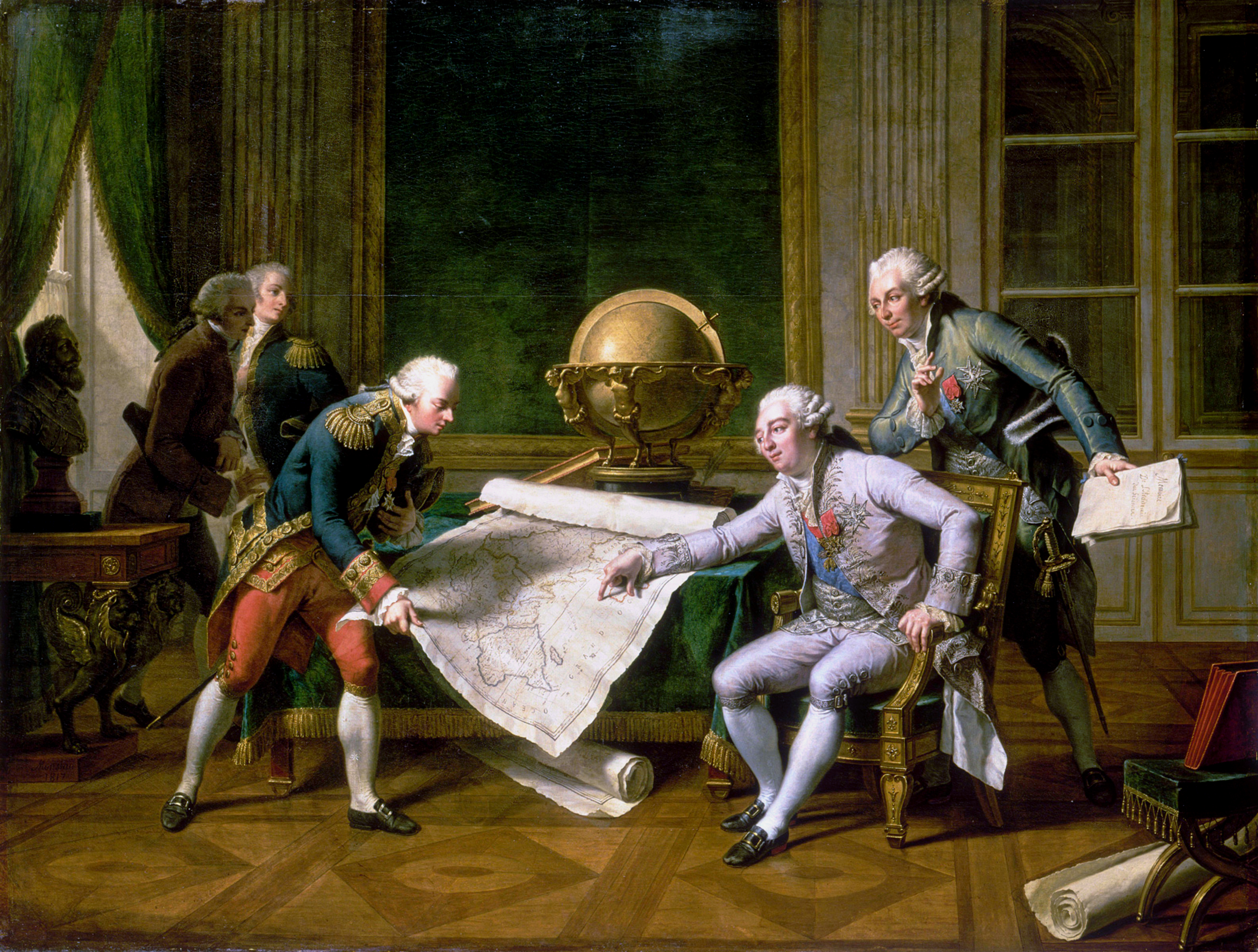
Louis XVI Giving His Instructions to La Pérouse by Nicolas-André Monsiau, 1817

Louis XVI hoped to use the American Revolutionary War as an opportunity to expel the British from India. In 1782, he sealed an alliance with the Peshwa Madhavrao II. As a consequence, the Marquis de Bussy-Castelnau moved his troops to the Isle de France (now Mauritius) and later contributed to the French effort in India in 1783. Pierre André de Suffren became the ally of Hyder Ali in the Second Anglo-Mysore War against the British East India Company from 1782 to 1783, engaging the Royal Navy along the coasts of India and Ceylon.

France also intervened in Cochinchina following Pierre Pigneau de Behaine's intervention to obtain military aid. A France-Cochinchina alliance was signed through the Treaty of Versailles of 1787, between Louis XVI and Prince Nguyễn Ánh.

Louis XVI also encouraged major voyages of exploration. In 1785, he appointed Jean-François de Galaup, comte de Lapérouse to lead a sailing expedition around the world (La Pérouse and his fleet disappeared after leaving Botany Bay in March 1788. Louis is recorded as having asked, on the morning of his execution, "Any news of La Pérouse?").

== Revolutionary constitutional reign (1789–1792) ==
There is a lack of scholarship on the subject of Louis XVI's time as a constitutional monarch, though it was a significant length of time. The reason as to why many biographers have not elaborated extensively on this time in the king's life is due to the uncertainty surrounding his actions during this period, as Louis XVI's declaration that was left behind in the Tuileries stated that he regarded his actions during his constitutional reign as provisional; he reflected that his "palace was a prison". This time period was exemplary in its demonstration of an institution's deliberation while in their last standing moments.

Louis XVI's time in his previous palace came to an end on 5 October 1789, when an angry mob of Parisian working men and women was incited by revolutionaries and marched on the Palace of Versailles, where the royal family lived. At dawn, they infiltrated the palace and attempted to kill the queen, who was associated with a frivolous lifestyle that symbolized much that was despised about the ancien régime. After the situation had been defused by La Fayette, head of the National Guard, the king and his family were brought by the crowd to the Tuileries Palace in Paris, the reasoning being that the King would be more accountable to the people if he lived among them in Paris.

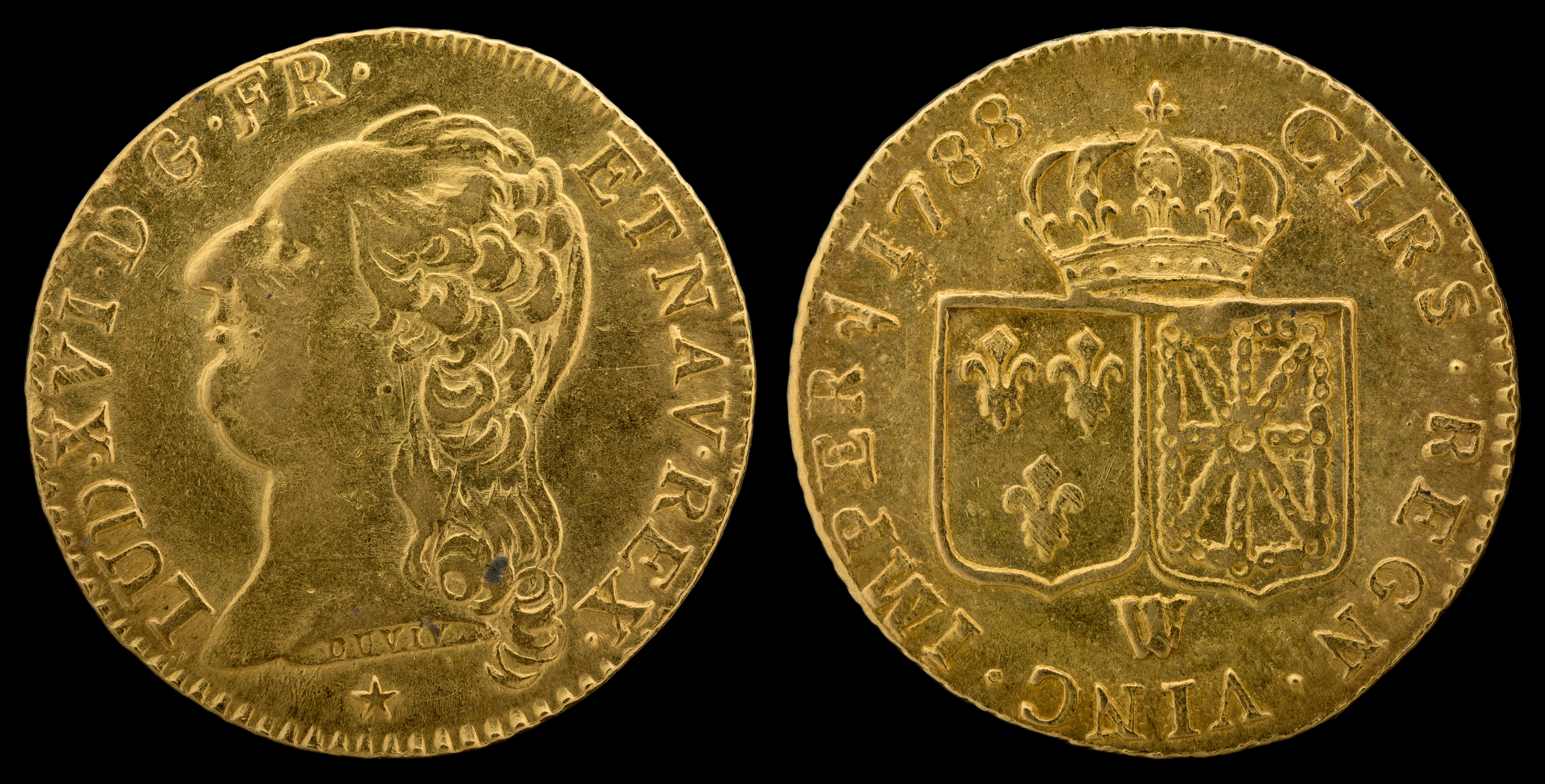
One Louis d'or, 1788, depicting Louis XVI

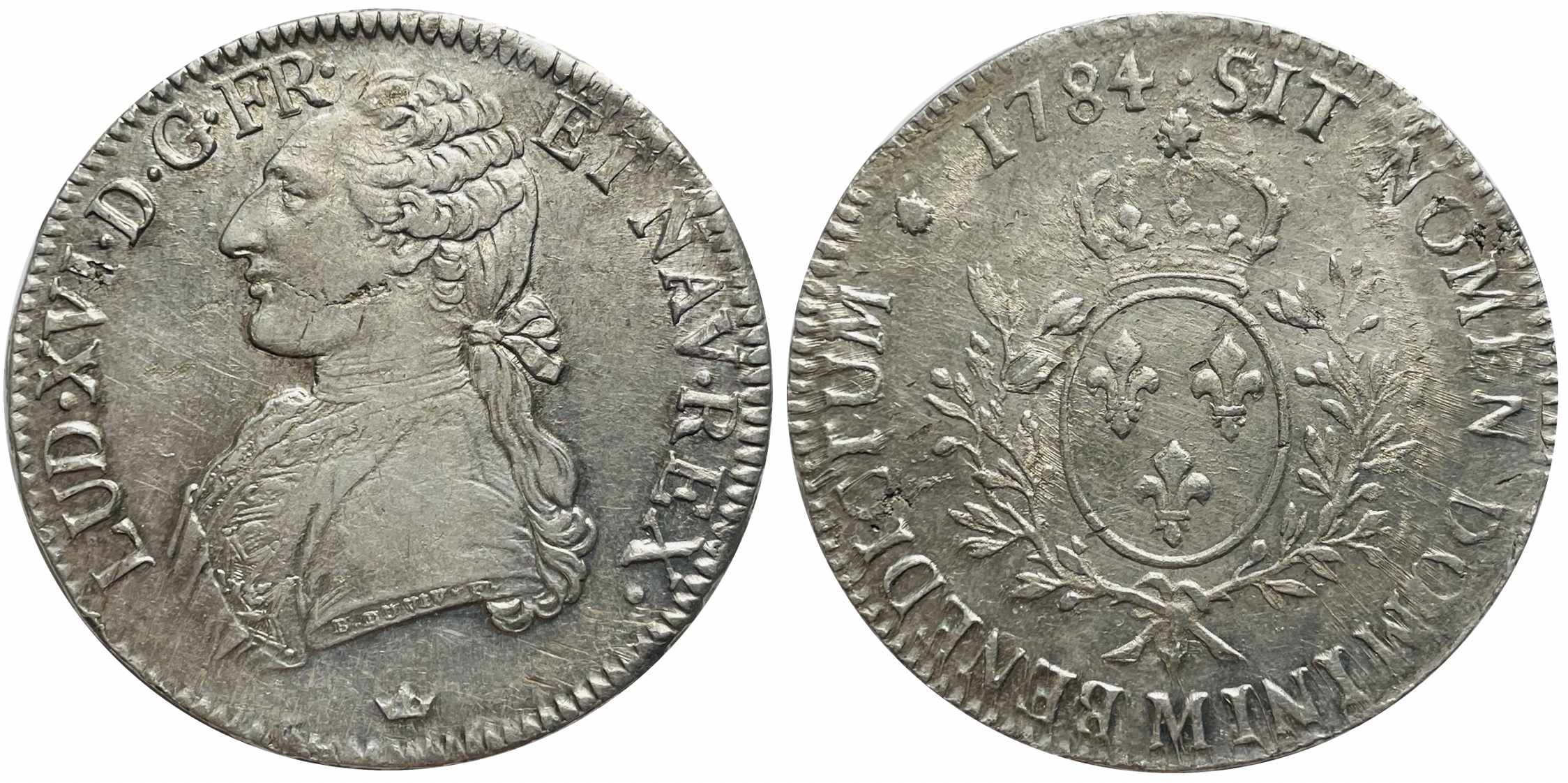
Silver coin: 1 écu – Louis XVI, 1784

The Revolution's principles of popular sovereignty, though central to democratic principles of later eras, marked a decisive break from the centuries-old principle of divine right that was at the heart of the French monarchy. As a result, the Revolution was opposed by many of the rural people of France and by all the governments of France's neighbors. Still, within the city of Paris and amongst the philosophers of the time, many of which were members of the National Assembly, the monarchy had next to no support. As the Revolution became more radical and the masses more uncontrollable, several of the Revolution's leading figures began to doubt its benefits. Some, like Honoré Mirabeau, secretly plotted with the Crown to restore its power in a new constitutional form.

Beginning in 1791, Armand Marc, comte de Montmorin, Minister of Foreign Affairs, started to organize covert resistance to the revolutionary forces. Thus, the funds of the Liste Civile, voted annually by the National Assembly, were partially assigned to secret expenses in order to preserve the monarchy. Arnault Laporte, who was in charge of the civil list, collaborated with both Montmorin and Mirabeau. After the sudden death of Mirabeau, Maximilien Radix de Sainte-Foix, a noted financier, took his place. In effect, he headed a secret council of advisers to Louis XVI, which tried to preserve the monarchy; these schemes proved unsuccessful, and were exposed later when the armoire de fer was discovered. Regarding the financial difficulties facing France, the Assembly created the Comité des Finances, and while Louis XVI attempted to declare his concern and interest in remedying the economic situations, inclusively offering to melt crown silver as a dramatic measure, it appeared to the public that the King did not understand that such statements no longer held the same meaning as they did before and that doing such a thing could not restore the economy of a country.

Mirabeau's death on 7 April, and Louis XVI's indecision, fatally weakened negotiations between the Crown and moderate politicians. The Third Estate leaders also had no desire in turning back or remaining moderate after their hard efforts to change the politics of the time, and so the plans for a constitutional monarchy did not last long. On one hand, Louis was nowhere near as reactionary as his brothers, the Count of Provence and the Count of Artois, and he repeatedly sent messages to them requesting a halt to their attempts to launch counter-coups. This was often done through his secretly nominated regent, Cardinal Étienne Charles de Loménie de Brienne. On the other hand, Louis was alienated from the new democratic government both by its negative reaction to the traditional role of the monarch and in its treatment of him and his family. He was particularly irked by being kept essentially as a prisoner in the Tuileries, and by the refusal of the new regime to allow him to have confessors and priests of his choice rather than 'constitutional priests' pledged to the state and not the Roman Catholic Church.

=== Flight to Varennes (1791) ===
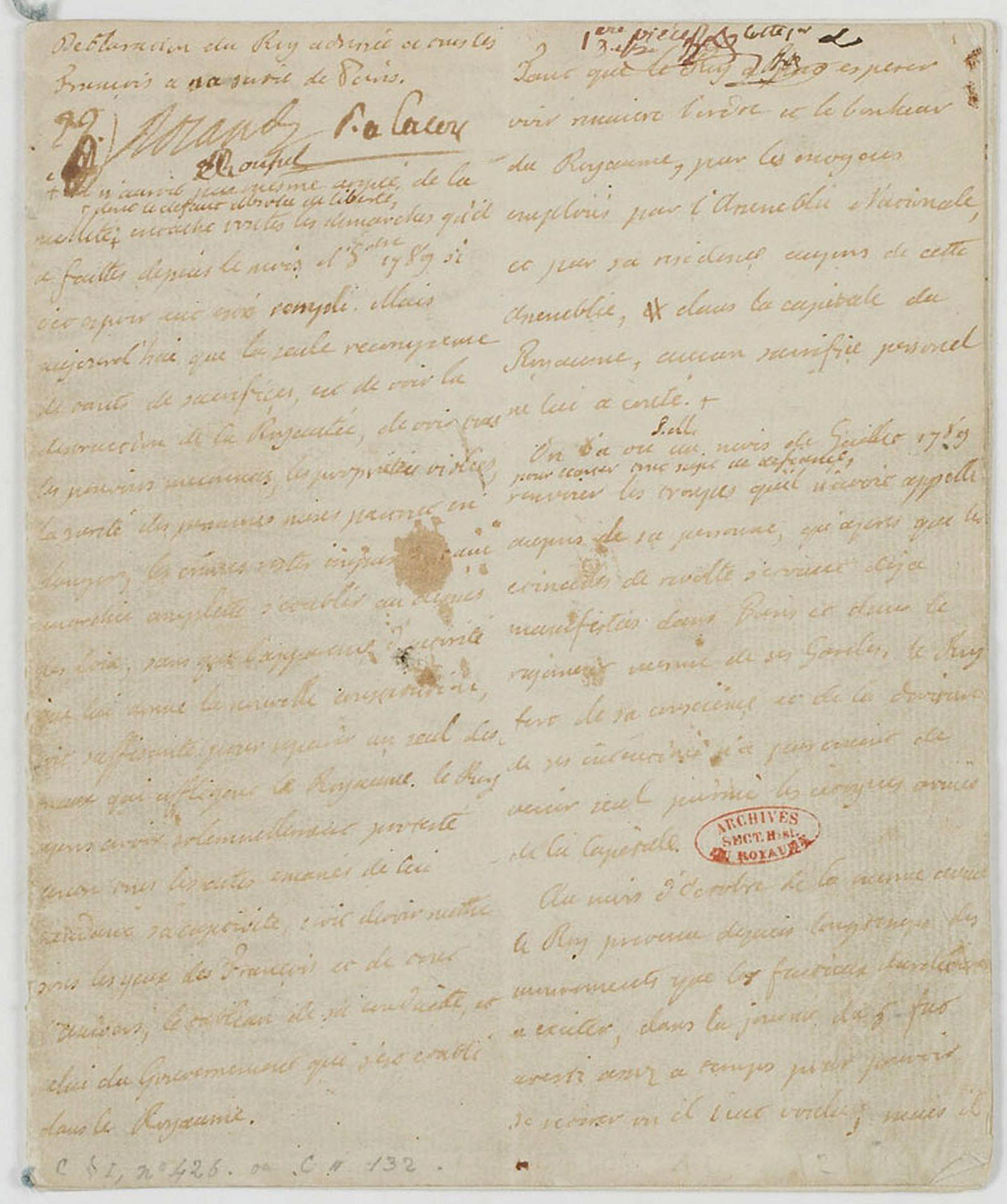
Declaration to the French People (June 1791)

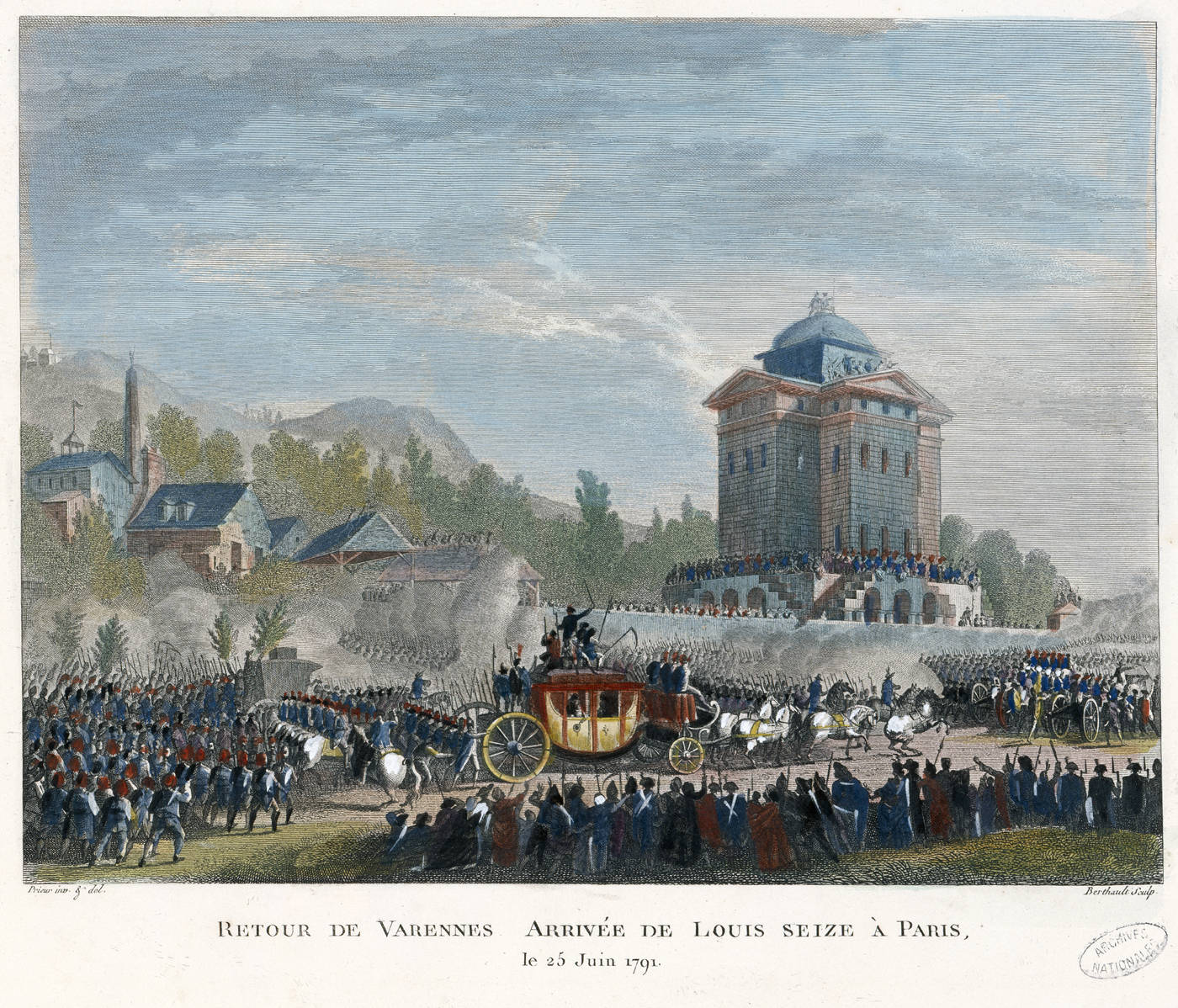
The return of the royal family to Paris on 25 June 1791, coloured copperplate after a drawing of Jean-Louis Prieur

On 21 June 1791, Louis XVI attempted to flee secretly with his family from Paris to the royalist fortress town of Montmédy on the northeastern border of France, where he would join the émigrés and be protected by Austria. The voyage was planned by the Swedish nobleman, and often assumed secret lover of Queen Marie Antoinette, Axel von Fersen.

While the National Assembly worked painstakingly towards a constitution, Louis and Marie-Antoinette were involved in plans of their own. Louis had appointed Louis Auguste Le Tonnelier de Breteuil to act as plenipotentiary, dealing with other foreign heads of state in an attempt to bring about a counter-revolution. Louis himself held reservations against depending on foreign assistance. Like his mother and father, he thought that the Austrians were treacherous and the Prussians were overly ambitious. As tensions in Paris rose and he was pressured to accept measures from the Assembly against his will, Louis XVI and the Queen plotted to secretly escape from Paris. Beyond escape, they hoped to raise an "armed congress" with the help of the émigrés, as well as assistance from other nations with which they could return and, in essence, recapture France. This degree of planning reveals Louis's political determination, but it was for this determined plot that he was eventually convicted of high treason. He left behind (on his bed) a 16-page written manifesto, Déclaration du roi, adressée à tous les François, à sa sortie de Paris (rediscovered in the US in 2009), traditionally known as the Testament politique de Louis XVI ("Political Testament of Louis XVI"), commenting on his feelings about the Revolution, criticizing some of its consequences, without rejecting its major reforms, such as the abolition of the orders and civil equality.

The National Assembly was quick to decide to publish the theory that the King had been kidnapped, thus avoiding any challenge to the Constitution, which was then nearing completion, while at the same time ordering that the carriage be placed under arrest. It was a deliberately deceptive choice, since Louis XVI had left a manifesto in plain view, assuming and justifying the escape. La Fayette decided to censor the text. Letters were sent throughout the country to stop the royal carriage.

Louis's indecision, many delays, and misunderstanding of France were responsible for the failure of the escape. Within 24 hours, the royal family was arrested at Varennes-en-Argonne shortly after Jean-Baptiste Drouet, who recognised the king from his profile on a 50 livres assignat (paper money), had given the alert. Louis XVI and his family were taken back to Paris where they arrived on 25 June. Viewed suspiciously as traitors, they were placed under tight house arrest upon their return to the Tuileries.

At the individual level, the failure of the escape plans was due to a series of misadventures, delays, misinterpretations, and poor judgments. In a wider perspective, the failure was attributable to the king's indecision—he repeatedly postponed the schedule, allowing for smaller problems to become severe. Furthermore, he totally misunderstood the political situation. He thought only a small number of radicals in Paris were promoting a revolution that the people as a whole rejected. He thought, mistakenly, that he was beloved by his subjects. The King's flight in the short term was traumatic for France, inciting a wave of emotions that ranged from anxiety to violence to panic. The realization that the King had repudiated the Revolution was a shock for people who until then had seen him as a good king who governed as a manifestation of God's will. Many suspected the King of collaborating with the Austrians, due to Marie Antoinette's family ties and the fact that the monarchs had clearly been heading for the Austrian border. War now seemed imminent, and the King seemed to have been politically involved with France's traditional enemies, who were still widely hated despite recent cooperation. Many citizens felt betrayed, and as a result, Republicanism now burst out of the coffee houses and became a dominating philosophy of the rapidly radicalized French Revolution.

=== Intervention by foreign powers ===
The other monarchies of Europe looked with concern upon the developments in France, and considered whether they should intervene, either in support of Louis or to take advantage of the chaos in France. The key figure was Marie Antoinette's brother, Leopold II, Holy Roman Emperor. Initially, he had looked on the Revolution with equanimity. However, he became more and more disturbed as it became more and more radical. Despite this, he still hoped to avoid war.

On 27 August, Leopold and Frederick William II of Prussia, in consultation with émigrés French nobles, issued the Declaration of Pillnitz, which declared the interest of the monarchs of Europe in the well-being of Louis and his family, and threatened vague but severe consequences if anything should befall them. Although Leopold saw the Pillnitz Declaration as an easy way to appear concerned about the developments in France without committing any soldiers or finances to change them, the revolutionary leaders in Paris viewed it fearfully as a dangerous foreign attempt to undermine France's sovereignty.

In addition to the ideological differences between France and the monarchical powers of Europe, there were continuing disputes over the status of Austrian estates in Alsace, and the concern of members of the National Constituent Assembly about the agitation of émigrés nobles abroad, especially in the Austrian Netherlands and the minor states of the Holy Roman Empire.

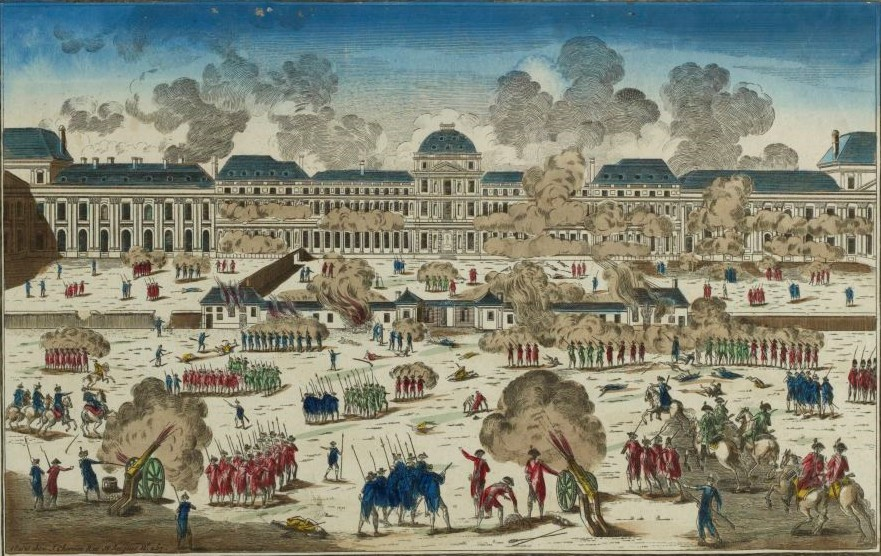
The Storming of the Tuileries Palace, on 10 August 1792 (Musée de la Révolution française)

In the end, the Legislative Assembly, supported by Louis XVI, declared war on Austria ("the King of Bohemia and Hungary") first, voting for war on 20 April 1792, after a long list of grievances was presented to it by the foreign minister, Charles François Dumouriez. Dumouriez prepared an immediate invasion of the Austrian Netherlands, where he expected the local population to rise against Austrian rule. However, the Revolution had thoroughly disorganised the army, and the forces raised were insufficient for the invasion. The soldiers fled at the first sign of battle and, in one case, on 28 April 1792, murdered their general, Irish-born Théobald Dillon, whom they accused of treason.

While the revolutionary government frantically raised fresh troops and reorganised its armies, a Prussian-Austrian army under Charles William Ferdinand, Duke of Brunswick assembled at Koblenz on the Rhine. In July, the invasion began, with Brunswick's army easily taking the fortresses of Longwy and Verdun. The duke then issued on 25 July a proclamation called the Brunswick Manifesto, written by Louis's émigré cousin, Louis Joseph, Prince of Condé, declaring the intent of the Austrians and Prussians to restore the King to his full powers and to treat any person or town who opposed them as rebels to be condemned to death by martial law.

Contrary to its intended purpose of strengthening Louis XVI's position against the revolutionaries, the Brunswick Manifesto greatly undermined his already highly tenuous position. It was taken by many to be the final proof of collusion between the King and foreign powers in a conspiracy against his own country. The anger of the populace boiled over on 10 August when an armed mob – with the backing of a new municipal government of Paris that came to be known as the Insurrectional Paris Commune – marched upon and invaded the Tuileries Palace. The royal family took shelter with the Legislative Assembly.

== Imprisonment, execution and burial (1792–1793) ==
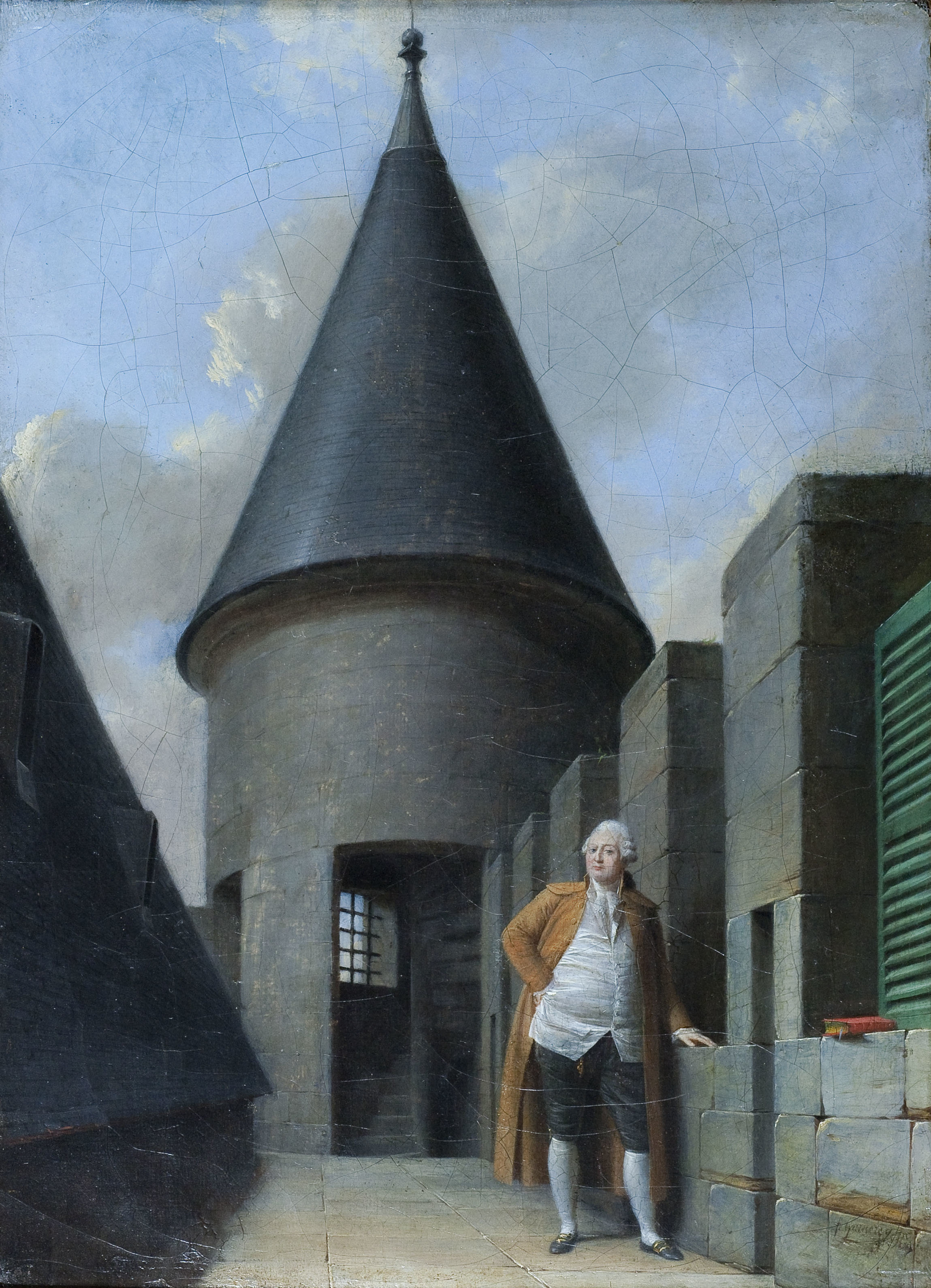
Posthumous portrait of Louis XVI imprisoned at the Tour du Temple (by Jean-François Garneray, 1814)

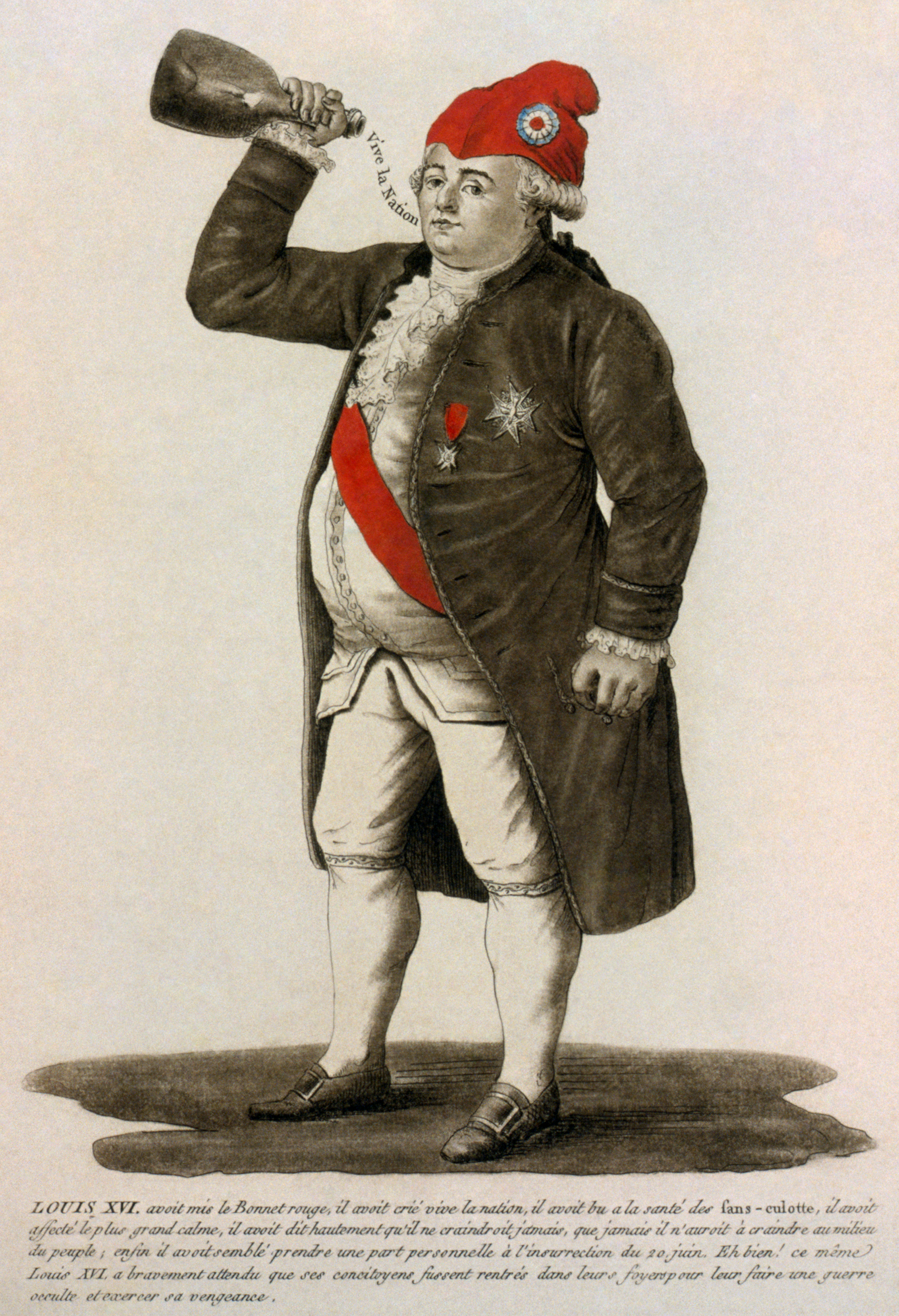
Tinted etching of Louis XVI, 1792. The caption refers to the date of the Tennis Court Oath and concludes, "The same Louis XVI who bravely waits until his fellow citizens return to their hearths to plan a secret war and exact his revenge."

Louis was officially arrested on 13 August 1792 and sent to the Temple, an ancient fortress in Paris that was used as a prison. On 21 September, the National Assembly declared France to be a republic, and abolished the monarchy. Louis was stripped of all of his titles and honors, and from this date was known as Citoyen Louis Capet.

The Girondins were partial to keeping the deposed king under arrest, both as a hostage and a guarantee for the future. Members of the Commune and the most radical deputies, who would soon form the group known as the Mountain, argued for Louis's immediate execution. The legal background of many of the deputies made it difficult for a great number of them to accept an execution without the due process of law, and it was voted that the deposed monarch be tried before the National Convention, the organ that housed the representatives of the sovereign people. In many ways, the former king's trial represented the trial of the monarchy by the Revolution. It was seen as if with the death of one came the life of the other. The historian Jules Michelet later argued that the death of the former king led to the acceptance of violence as a tool for happiness. He said, "If we accept the proposition that one person can be sacrificed for the happiness of the many, it will soon be demonstrated that two or three or more could also be sacrificed for the happiness of the many. Little by little, we will find reasons for sacrificing the many for the happiness of the many, and we will think it was a bargain."

Two events led up to the trial for Louis XVI. First, after the Battle of Valmy on 22 September 1792, General Dumouriez negotiated with the Prussians who evacuated France. Louis could no longer be considered a hostage or as leverage in negotiations with the invading forces. Second, in November 1792, the armoire de fer (iron chest) incident took place at the Tuileries Palace, when the existence of the hidden safe in the king's bedroom containing compromising documents and correspondence, was revealed by François Gamain, the Versailles locksmith who had installed it. Gamain went to Paris on 20 November and told Jean-Marie Roland, Girondin Minister of the Interior, who ordered it opened. The resulting scandal served to discredit the King. Following these two events the Girondins could no longer keep the King from trial.

On 11 December, among crowded and silent streets, the deposed king was brought from the Temple to stand before the National Convention and hear his indictment, an accusation of high treason and crimes against the State. On 26 December, his counsel, Raymond Desèze, delivered Louis's response to the charges, with the assistance of François Tronchet and Guillaume-Chrétien de Lamoignon de Malesherbes. Before the trial started and Louis mounted his defense to the convention, he told his lawyers that he knew he would be found guilty and be killed, but to prepare and act as though they could win. He was resigned to and accepted his fate before the verdict was determined, but he was willing to fight to be remembered as a good king for his people.

The convention would be voting on three questions: first, is Louis guilty; second, whatever the decision, should there be an appeal to the people; and third, if found guilty, what punishment should Louis suffer? The order of the voting on each question was a compromise within the Jacobin movement between the Girondins and the Mountain; neither were satisfied but both accepted.

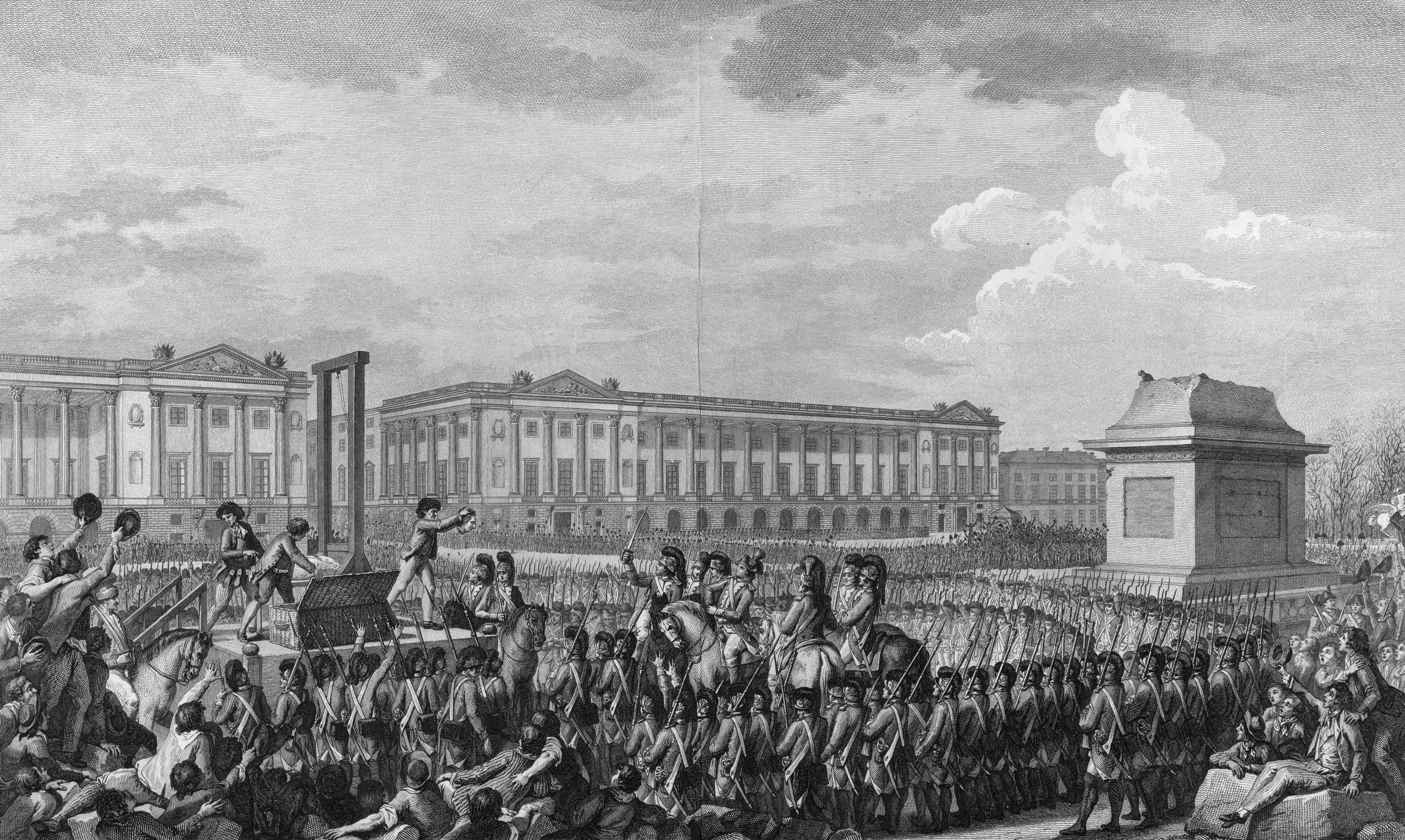
Execution of Louis XVI in the Place de la Révolution. The empty pedestal in front of him had supported an equestrian statue of his grandfather, Louis XV. When the monarchy was abolished on 21 September 1792, the statue was torn down and sent to be melted.

On 15 January 1793, the convention, composed of 721 deputies, voted on the verdict. Given the overwhelming evidence of Louis's collusion with the invaders, the verdict was a foregone conclusion – with 693 deputies voting guilty, none for acquittal, with 23 abstaining. The next day, a roll-call vote was carried out to decide upon the fate of the former king, and the result was uncomfortably close for such a dramatic decision. 288 of the deputies voted against death and for some other alternative, mainly some means of imprisonment or exile. 72 of the deputies voted for the death penalty, but subject to several delaying conditions and reservations. The voting took a total of 36 hours. 361 of the deputies voted for Louis's immediate execution. Louis was condemned to death by a majority of one vote. Philippe Égalité, formerly the Duke of Orléans and Louis's cousin, voted for Louis's execution, a cause of much future bitterness among French monarchists; he would himself be guillotined on the same scaffold, Place de la Révolution, before the end of the same year, on 6 November 1793.

The next day, a motion to grant Louis XVI reprieve from the death sentence was voted down: 310 of the deputies requested mercy, but 380 voted for the immediate execution of the death penalty. This decision would be final. Malesherbes wanted to break the news to Louis and bitterly lamented the verdict, but Louis told him he would see him again in a happier life and he would regret leaving a friend like Malesherbes behind. The last thing Louis said to him was that he needed to control his tears because all eyes would be upon him.

Paul Wranitzky: "Funeral March for the Death of King Louis XVI" from the Symphony Op. 31 "The Revolution" or "La Paix", Mov. 2 Pt. 2.
Porticodoro / SmartCGArt Media Productions – Classical Orchestra.

On 21 January 1793, Louis XVI, at age 38, was beheaded by a guillotine on the Place de la Révolution. As Louis XVI mounted the scaffold, he appeared dignified and resigned. He delivered a short speech in which he pardoned "...those who are the cause of my death.... ". He then declared himself innocent of the crimes of which he was accused, praying that his blood would not fall back on France. Many accounts suggest Louis XVI's desire to say more, but Antoine Joseph Santerre, a general in the National Guard, halted the speech by ordering a drum roll. The former king was then quickly beheaded. Some accounts of Louis's beheading indicate that the blade did not sever his neck entirely the first time. There are also accounts of a blood-curdling scream issuing from Louis after the blade fell but this is unlikely, since the blade severed Louis's spine. The executioner, Charles-Henri Sanson, testified that the former king had bravely met his fate.

Immediately after his execution, Louis XVI's corpse was transported in a cart to the nearby Madeleine cemetery, located on rue d'Anjou, where those guillotined at the Place de la Révolution were buried in mass graves. Before his burial, a short religious service was held in the Madeleine church (destroyed in 1799) by two priests who had sworn allegiance to the Civil Constitution of the Clergy. Afterward, Louis XVI, his severed head placed between his feet, was buried in an unmarked grave, with quicklime spread over his body. The Madeleine cemetery was closed in 1794. In 1815, Louis XVIII had the remains of his brother Louis XVI and of his sister-in-law Marie Antoinette transferred and buried in the Basilica of St Denis, the Royal necropolis of the Kings and Queens of France. Between 1816 and 1826, a commemorative monument, the Chapelle expiatoire, was erected at the location of the former cemetery and church.

As Louis's blood dripped onto the ground, several onlookers ran forward to dip their handkerchiefs in it. This account was proven true in 2012 after a DNA comparison linked blood thought to be from Louis XVI's beheading to DNA taken from tissue samples originating from what was long thought to be the mummified head of his ancestor, Henry IV of France. The blood sample was taken from a squash gourd carved to commemorate the heroes of the French Revolution that had, according to legend, been used to house one of the handkerchiefs dipped in Louis's blood.

== Legacy ==
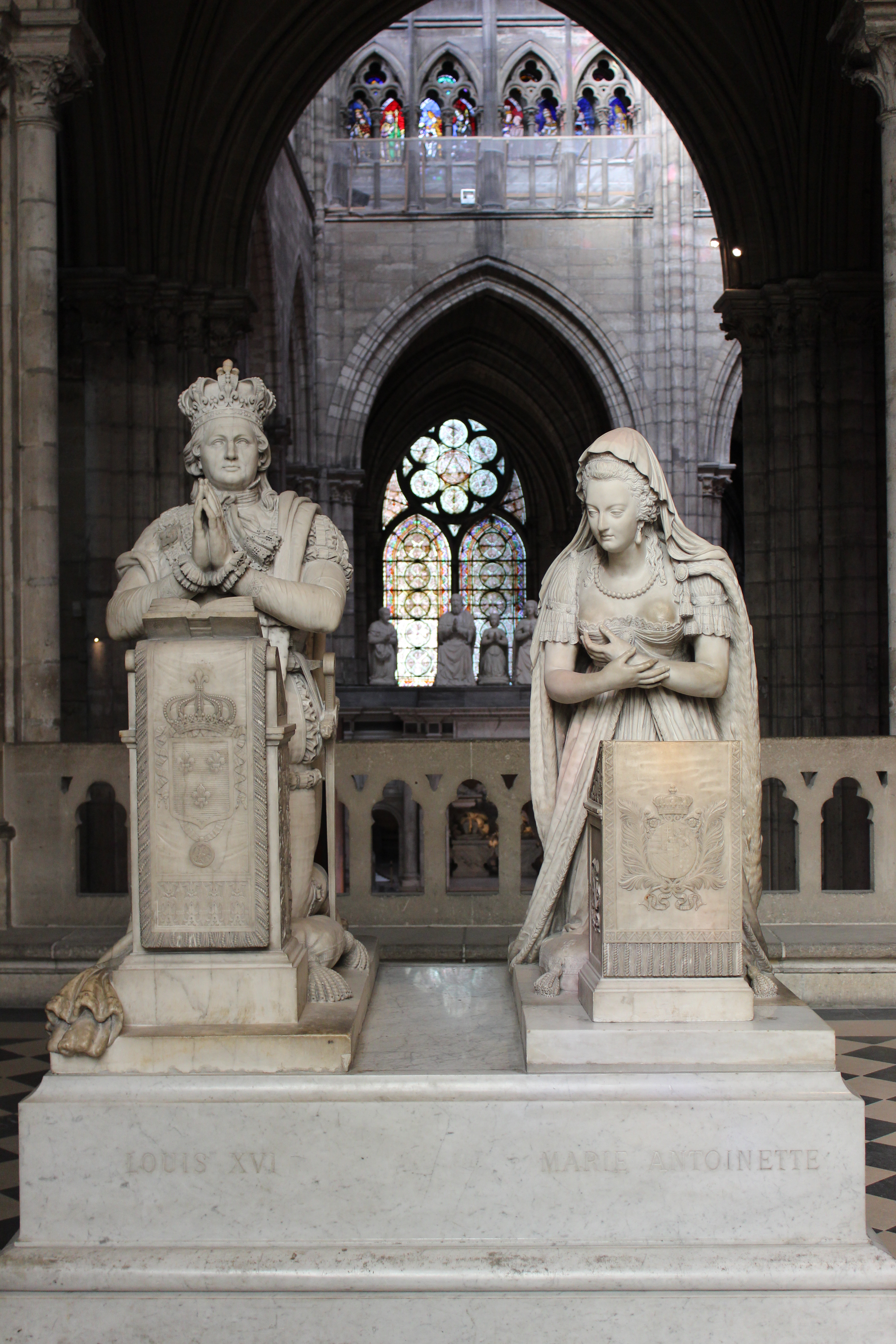
Memorial to Louis XVI and Marie Antoinette, sculptures by Edme Gaulle and Pierre Petitot in the Basilica of Saint-Denis

=== Reputation ===
The 19th-century historian Jules Michelet attributed the restoration of the French monarchy to the sympathy that had been engendered by the execution of Louis XVI. Michelet's Histoire de la Révolution Française and Alphonse de Lamartine's Histoire des Girondins, in particular, showed the marks of the feelings aroused by the revolution's regicide. The two writers did not share the same sociopolitical vision, but they agreed that, even though the monarchy was rightly ended in 1792, the lives of the royal family should have been spared. Lack of compassion at that moment contributed to a radicalization of revolutionary violence and to greater divisiveness among Frenchmen. For the 20th century novelist Albert Camus the execution signaled the end of the role of God in history, for which he mourned. For the 20th century philosopher Jean-François Lyotard the regicide was the starting point of all French thought, the memory of which acts as a reminder that French modernity began under the sign of a crime.

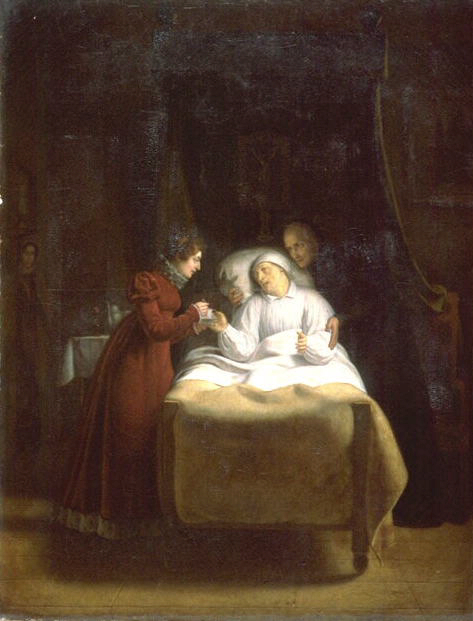
The Duchess of Angoulême at the deathbed of Henry Essex Edgeworth, last confessor to Louis XVI, by Alexandre-Toussaint Menjaud, 1817

Louis's daughter, Marie-Thérèse-Charlotte, the future Duchess of Angoulême, survived the French Revolution, and she lobbied in Rome energetically for the canonization of her father as a saint of the Catholic Church. Despite his signing of the Civil Constitution of the Clergy, Louis had been described as a martyr by Pope Pius VI in 1793. In 1820, however, a memorandum of the Sacred Congregation of Rites in Rome, declaring the impossibility of proving that Louis had been executed for religious rather than political reasons, put an end to hopes of canonization.

Other commemorations of Louis XVI include:

- The Requiem in C minor for mixed chorus by Luigi Cherubini was written in 1816, in memory of Louis XVI.
- The Requiem for Louis XVI and Marie Antoinette by Jean-Paul-Égide Martini was written for, and performed at the burial ceremony in St. Denis in 1815.
- Talleyrand commissioned a Requiem for the memory of Louis XVI from Sigismund von Neukomm, a pupil and protégé of Joseph Haydn, which was performed in 1815 in Vienna.
- Paul Wranitzky's Symphony Op. 31 (1797), which is themed on the events of the French Revolution, includes a section titled "The Funeral March for the Death of the King Louis XVI".
- The city of Louisville, Kentucky, is named for Louis XVI. In 1780, the Virginia General Assembly bestowed this name in honor of the French king, whose soldiers were aiding the American side in the Revolutionary War. At that time, Kentucky was a part of the Commonwealth of Virginia. Kentucky became the 15th State of the United States in 1792.

=== In film and television ===
King Louis XVI has been portrayed in numerous films. In Captain of the Guard (1930), he is played by Stuart Holmes. In Marie Antoinette (1938), he was played by Robert Morley. Jean-François Balmer portrayed him in the 1989 two-part miniseries La Révolution française. More recently, he was depicted in the 2006 film Marie Antoinette by Jason Schwartzman. In Sacha Guitry's Si Versailles m'était conté, Louis was portrayed by one of the film's producers, Gilbert Bokanowski, using the alias Gilbert Boka. Several portrayals have upheld the image of a bumbling, almost foolish king, such as that by Jacques Morel in the 1956 French film Marie-Antoinette reine de France and that by Terence Budd in the Lady Oscar live action film. In the 1989 series La Révolution française, Jean-François Balmer played Louis as an intelligent, but ultimately ineffective ruler overwhelmed by events. In Start the Revolution Without Me, Louis XVI is portrayed by Hugh Griffith as a laughable cuckold. Mel Brooks played a comic version of Louis XVI in The History of the World Part 1, portraying him as a libertine who has such distaste for the peasantry he uses them as targets in skeet shooting. In the 1996 film Ridicule, Urbain Cancelier plays Louis.

In the 2024 6 part Apple TV+ series Franklin Tom Pezier performs the role. In the ongoing PBS series Marie Antoinette (2022-) Louis XVI is portrayed by Louis Cunningham.

=== In literature ===
Louis XVI has been the subject of novels as well, including two of the alternate histories anthologized in If It Had Happened Otherwise (1931): "If Drouet's Cart Had Stuck" by Hilaire Belloc and "If Louis XVI Had Had an Atom of Firmness" by André Maurois, which tell very different stories but both imagine Louis surviving and still reigning in the early 19th century. Louis appears in the children's book Ben and Me by Robert Lawson but does not appear in the 1953 animated short film based on the same book.

== Genealogical tests ==
Maarten Larmuseau et al. (2013) tested the Y-DNA of three living members of the House of Bourbon, one descending from Louis XIII of France via King Louis Philippe I, and two from Louis XIV via Philip V of Spain, and concluded that all three men share the same STR haplotype and belonged to haplogroup R1b (R-M343). The three individuals were further assigned to sub-haplogroup R1b1b2a1a1b* (R-Z381*). These results contradicted an earlier DNA analysis of a handkerchief dipped in the presumptive blood of Louis XVI after his execution performed by Laluez-Fo et al. (2010).

== Arms ==
Coat of arms of Louis XVI
Notes Upon his accession to the throne Louis assumed the royal coat of arms of France & Navarre. Adopted 1774–1793 Crest The Royal crown of France Helm An opened gold helmet, with blue and gold mantling. Escutcheon Azure, three fleurs-de-lis Or (for France) impaling Gules on a chain in cross saltire and orle Or an emerald Proper (for Navarre). Supporters The two supporters are two angels, acting as heralds for the two realms. The dexter angel carries a standard with the arms of France, and wearing a tabard with the same arms. The sinister angel also carries a standard and wears a tabard, but that of Navarre. Both are standing on puffs of cloud. Motto The motto is written in gold on a blue ribbon: Montjoie Saint Denis! the war cry of France, Saint Denis was also the abbey where the oriflamme was kept. Orders The escutcheons are surrounded first by the chain of the Order of Saint Michael and by the chain of the Order of the Holy Spirit, both were known as the ordres du roi. Other elements Above all is a pavilion armoyé with the Royal crown. From it, is a royal blue mantle with a semis of fleurs-de-lis Or, lined on the inside with ermine. Banner Royal standard of the king

== Bibliography ==
- Baecque, Antoine de. "From Royal Dignity to Republican Austerity: the Ritual for the Reception of Louis XVI in the French National Assembly (1789–1792)". Journal of Modern History 1994 66(4): 671–696. JSTOR 2125154 De Baecque, Antoine (1994). "From Royal Dignity to Republican Austerity: The Ritual for the Reception of Louis XVI in the French National Assembly (1789-1792)". The Journal of Modern History. 66 (4): 671–696. doi:10.1086/244936. JSTOR 2125154. Archived from the original on 20 December 2016.
- Burley, Peter. "A Bankrupt Regime". History Today (January 1984) 34:36–42.ISSN 0018-2753 Fulltext in EBSCO
- Doyle, William. Origins of the French Revolution (3rd ed. 1999) online
- Doyle, William. "The Execution of Louis XVI and the End of the French Monarchy". History Review. (2000) pp 21+ * Doyle, William (2002). The Oxford History of the French Revolution. UK: Oxford University Press. ISBN 978-0-19-925298-5. Pages 194–196 deal with the trial of Louis XVI.
- Doyle, William, ed. Old Regime France (2001).
- Dunn, Susan. The Deaths of Louis XVI: Regicide and the French Political Imagination. (1994). 178 pp.
- Hardman, John. Louis XVI: The Silent King (2nd ed. 2016) 500 pages; much expanded new edition; now the standard scholarly biography
  - Hardman, John. Louis XVI: The Silent King (1994) 224 pages, an older scholarly biography
- Hardman, John. French Politics, 1774–1789: From the Accession of Louis XVI to the Fall of the Bastille. (1995). 283 pp.
- Jones, Colin. The Great Nation: France from Louis XV to Napoleon (2002) Amazon.com Archived 9 March 2021 at the Wayback Machine, excerpt and text search
- Mignet, François Auguste (1824). "History of the French Revolution from 1789 to 1814". Project Gutenberg. See Chapter VI, The National Convention, for more details on the king's trial and execution.
- Padover, Saul K. The Life and Death of Louis XVI (1939)
- Price, Munro. The Road from Versailles: Louis XVI, Marie Antoinette, and the Fall of the French Monarchy (2004) 425 pp. Amazon.com Archived 8 May 2021 at the Wayback Machine, excerpt and text search; also published as The Fall of the French Monarchy: Louis XVI, Marie Antoinette and the Baron de Breteuil. (2002)
- Schama, Simon. Citizens. A Chronicle of the French Revolution (1989), highly readable narrative by scholar Amazon.com Archived 6 May 2021 at the Wayback Machine, excerpt and text search
- Tackett, Timothy. When the King Took Flight. (2003). 270 pp. Amazon.com Archived 7 July 2011 at the Wayback Machine, excerpt and text search

=== Historiography ===
- McGill, Frank N. "Execution of Louis XVI" in McGill's History of Europe (1993) 3:161–164
- Moncure, James A. ed. Research Guide to European Historical Biography: 1450–Present (4 vol 1992) 3:1193–1213
- Rigney, Ann. "Toward Varennes". New Literary History 1986 18(1): 77–98 JSTOR 468656 Rigney, Ann (1986). "Toward Varennes". New Literary History. 18 (1): 77–98. doi:10.2307/468656. JSTOR 468656. Archived from the original on 18 November 2015., on historiography

=== Primary sources ===
- Campan, Jeanne-Louise-Henriette (1910). Memoirs of Marie Antoinette, Queen of France and Wife of Louis XVI: Queen of France. Collier.
- Full text of writings of Louis XVI Archived 29 October 2012 at the Wayback Machine in Ball State University's Digital Media Repository.

Louis XVI House of Bourbon Cadet branch of the Capetian dynasty Born: 23 August 1754 Died: 21 January 1793
Regnal titles
Preceded by Louis XV	King of France; 10 May 1774 – 21 September 1792; King of the French from 1791	Vacant National Convention Title next held by Napoleon I as emperor
French royalty
Preceded by Louis	Dauphin of France; 20 December 1765 – 10 May 1774	Succeeded by Louis-Joseph
