= "Zoë" Jeanne Louise Victoire =

Foster daughter of Louis XVI and Marie Antoinette

- Born: Jeanne Louise Victoire; 1787; Kingdom of France
- Died: after 1792
- Parents: Louis XVI (adoptive) (father); Queen Marie Antoinette of France (adoptive) (mother)

Jeanne Louise Victoire "Zoë" (1787 – after 1792) was the adopted daughter of King Louis XVI (1754–1793) and Queen Marie-Antoinette (1755–1793) of France.

== Life ==
=== Early life ===
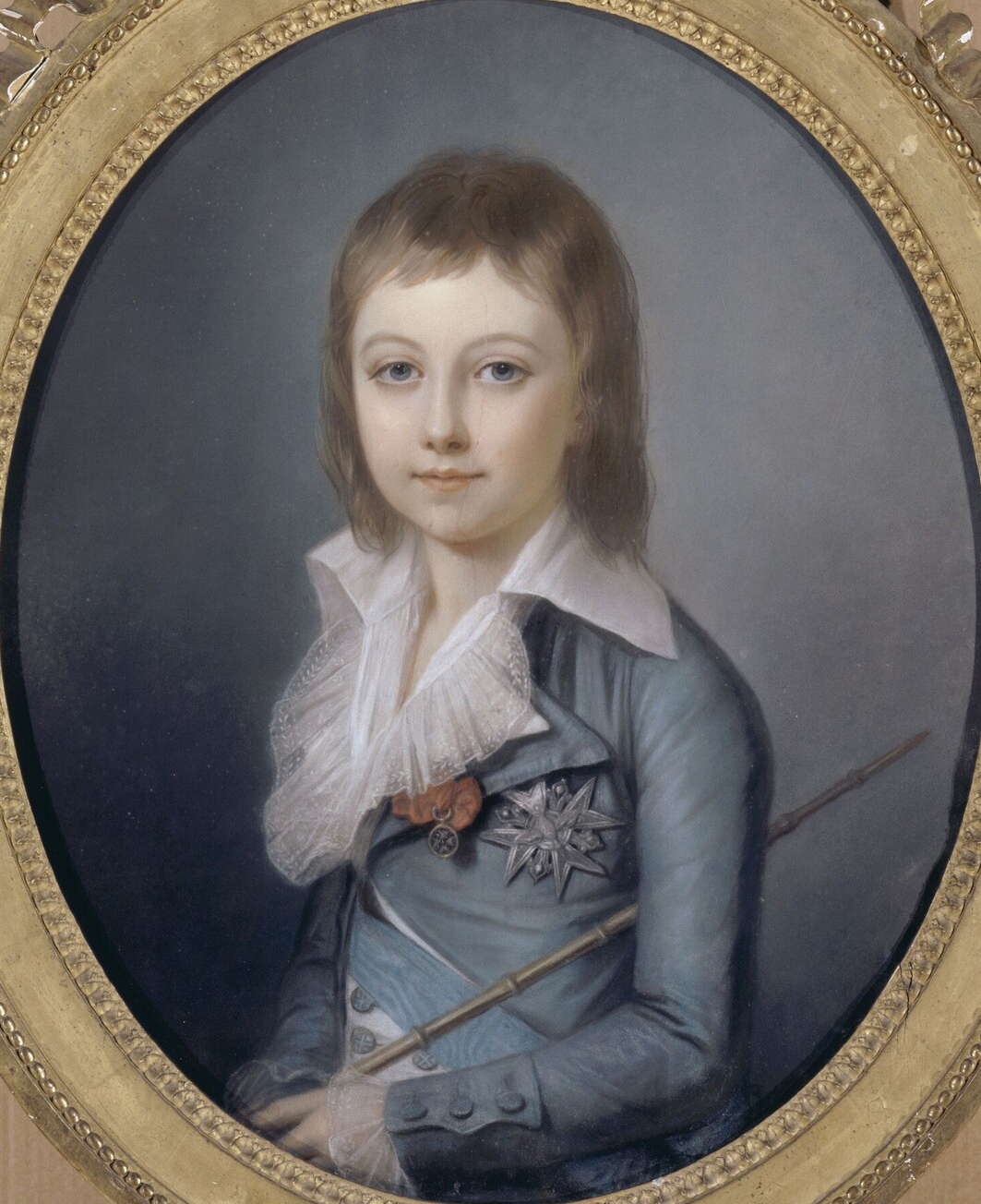
Zoë's adoptive brother, Louis-Charles, dauphin of France, whose household she joined

Jeanne Louise Victoire was born in 1787 as the daughter of an usher working in the Maison du Roi, the royal household. She had two older sisters. In 1790, they were orphaned and the queen took on the expenses of the children in return for the loyalty of their late parents.

=== Adoption by the queen ===
As Jeanne Louise Victoire was close in age to Prince Louis-Charles (1785–1795), the dauphin (the future King Louis XVII of France), Marie-Antoinette decided to adopt her and keep her in the royal household as his playmate. She gave a new name to her, Zoë. Her two elder sisters were sent to a convent boarding school on the queen's expense.

She was the last child to be adopted by the royal family, after François-Michel "Armand" Gagné (1771–1792), adopted in 1776, Jean Amilcar (1781–1796) adopted in 1787, and Marie-Philippine "Ernestine" Lambriquet (1778–1813), adopted in 1788. It was not an adoption in the modern formal sense, but rather an informal foster parenting, which was common at the time.

Zoë was sent away to join her sisters in their boarding school before the Flight to Varennes in 1791. The expenses of the girls stopped being paid when the queen was imprisoned the following year, but nothing further is known about their fate.

== See also ==
- Armand Gagné
- Jean Amilcar
- Ernestine Lambriquet
