= Ernestine Lambriquet =

Adopted daughter of Louis XVI (1778–1813)

- Ernestine Lambriquet
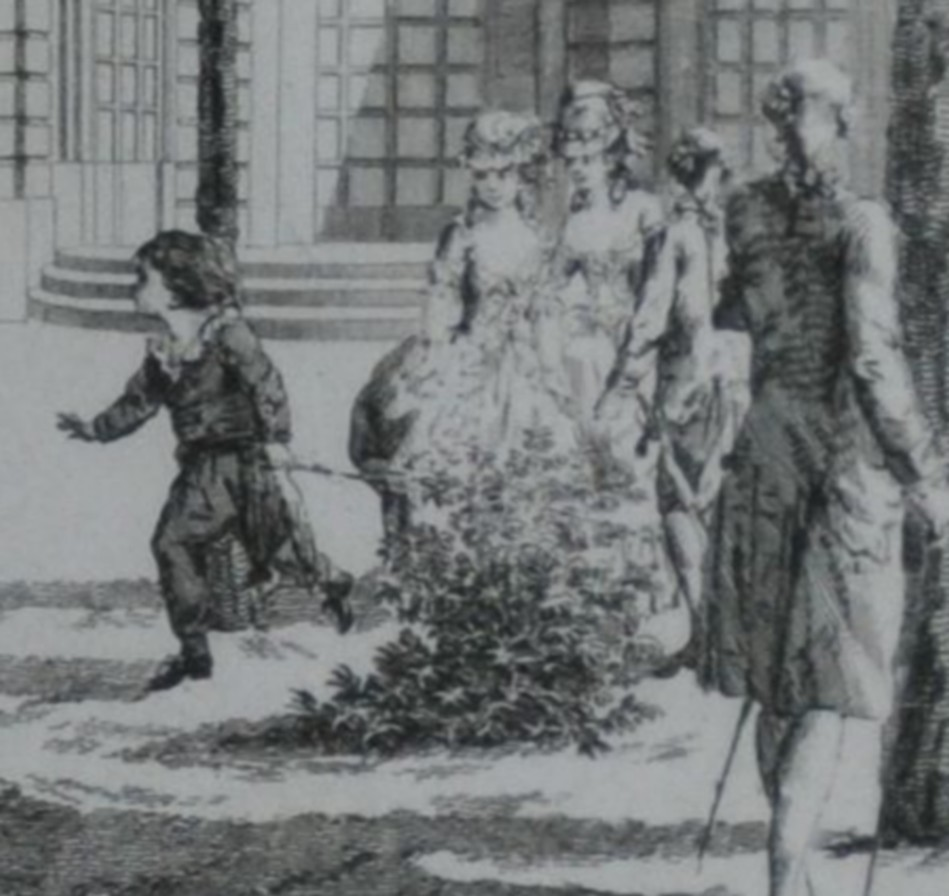
- Full name: Marie-Philippine Lambriquet
- Born: 31 July 1778; Palace of Versailles, Kingdom of France
- Died: 31 December 1813 (aged 35); Paris, First French Empire
- Spouse: Jean-Charles-Germain Prempain (m. 1810)
- Father: Jacque Lambriquet (biological) and Louis XVI (adoptive)
- Mother: Marie-Philippine Noiret (biological) and Marie Antoinette (adoptive)
- Occupation: playmate and daily companion of Princess Marie Thérèse

Ernestine de Lambriquet (Marie-Philippine Lambriquet, 31 July 1778 – 31 December 1813) was the adopted daughter (foster child) of King Louis XVI and Queen Marie Antoinette of France.

She was the playmate of Marie Thérèse of France in her childhood, and after the death of her biological mother, she was formally adopted (foster child, in a modern sense). She did not become a princess, but lived as a foster child in the royal family. Because of her visual resemblance to Marie Thérèse there were speculations that she was the secret daughter of Louis XVI, but there is no information to indicate that this was the case.

== Biography ==
=== Playmate of the Princess ===
She was born at Versailles as the daughter of Jacques Lambriquet (d. 1794) and Marie-Philippine Noiret (d. 1788). Her father began his career at court as a servant to the Comte de Provence. Her mother was a chambermaid at the Palace of Versailles.

She was said to have a physical resemblance to Louis XVI and to his daughter Marie Thérèse of France, and because of this, she has sometimes been speculated to be the secret illegitimate daughter of the king. She was the second eldest of her parents' four children, but she was the only one of her siblings to be adopted by the royal family. There is, however, nothing to indicate that she was the biological daughter of the king, a rumour which occurred merely because of her physical resemblance to Marie Thérèse. The kings of France often had illegitimate children who were normally recognized; the contemporary culture did not consider it necessary to hide them or keep them secret.

When she was a small child, she was chosen by the queen to be the playmate and companion of Princess Marie Thérèse. She spent her days with Marie Thérèse from their early childhood onward, although she returned home to her biological family at night. To informally allow a royal child a common playmate in this way was not an uncommon custom in early modern Europe, and Marie Antoinette considered it good for Marie Thérèse, since her daughter was known to be of a very proud disposition, in need of humility.

=== Adopted daughter ===
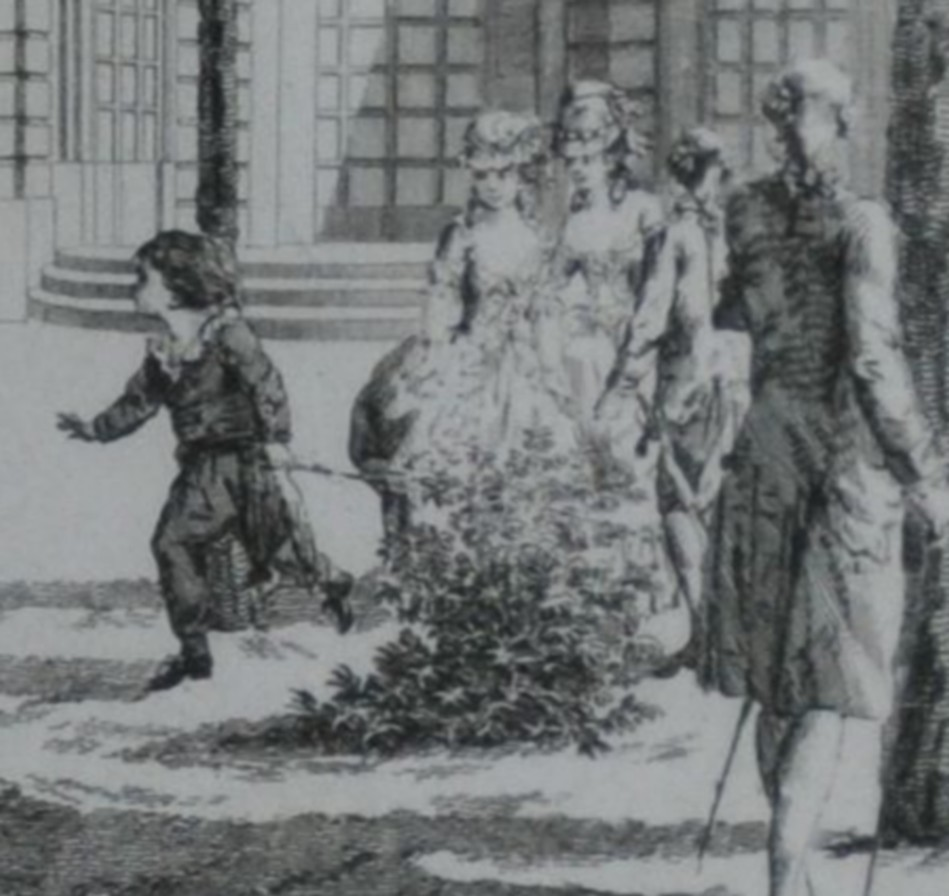
Marie Thérèse of France with Ernestine Lambriquet at Petit Trianon (c. 1789).

Having been an intimate of the royal family for years, she was formally adopted by the royal couple on 9 November 1788, after the death of her mother, and awarded a pension of 12,000 livres by the king. Marie Antoinette called her "Ernestine" from a character in a novel by Marie Jeanne Riccoboni.

She slept in the same room as Marie Thérèse, dressed the same way, ate the same food, was educated with her by the royal governesses and treated the same way materially. The royal couple did not merely allow Ernestine to share Marie Thérèse's things, but are noted to have paid high bills for Ernestine's personal expenses, such as when Ernestine needed extra lessons in Italian and geography. Marie Antoinette instructed the royal governesses to treat Ernestine and Marie Thérèse the same way in private, and made sure that the two girls took turns waiting upon each other as Marie Thérèse would have done with a biological sister, since Marie Thérèse was proud and Marie Antoinette thought it would be a lesson in humility to have a sister whom she was expected to treat as an equal.

The adoption was however purely a private matter: Ernestine was not formally given the rank of royal princess, or treated as a royal princess in public. She was known at court simply as "the girl who was always in the company of Marie Thérèse" and essentially had the position of a lady's companion. This was in fact not an uncommon thing in Europe in this time period, when royal children were sometimes given foster siblings as playmates, which were in no way acknowledged in public life.

The royal couple adopted three other children: "Armand" Francois-Michel Gagné, an orphan adopted along with his three older siblings in 1776; Jean Amilcar, a Senegalese slave boy given to the queen as a present by Chevalier de Boufflers in 1787, whom she freed and placed in a pension; and the orphan "Zoe" Jeanne Louise Victoire, daughter of an usher in service of the king, who was adopted along with her two older sisters after the death of her parents in 1790, and chosen to be the playmate of the Dauphin just as Ernestine had been the playmate of Marie Thérèse. Among the eight adopted children, however, only three (Ernestine, Armand and Zoe) actually lived with the royal family, and the rest simply lived on the queen's expense. Armand left the royal family after the outbreak of the revolution because of his republican sympathies, and Zoe was sent away to her sisters in a convent boarding school before the Flight to Varennes.

=== During the revolution ===
During the French Revolution, Ernestine accompanied the royal family from Versailles to the Tuileries in Paris in 1789. Her biological father and her two biological siblings also accompanied the royal court to Paris, but she lived with the royal family and her biological family were still members of staff. During the life of the royal family in the Tuleries, it is noted that Marie Antoinette, who had stopped going to the theatre and only attended the salon of the Princess de Lamballe, mostly entertained herself in private with needle work and by tutoring her daughter and Ernestine Lambriquet. On 4 April 1790, Ernestine and Marie Thérèse went to their Confirmation together at the Saint Germain-l'Auxerrois in Paris, which was a public event.

Ernestine did not accompany the royal family on the Flight to Varennes in June 1791; she was sent to her biological father in the country, and returned to the Tuileries when the flight failed and the royal family was brought back to Paris. Her foster sister mention briefly in her memoirs: "I passed the rest of the evening alone; my mother had induced Mme. de Mackau, my subgoverness, to go and spend a few days in a convent of which, she was very fond, and had also sent into the country a young girl who was usually with me; besides which she ordered me to send away all my servants except one woman."

On the 10 August 1792, Marie Antoinette ordered the royal sub-governess Renée Suzanne de Soucy to bring Ernestine to safety. Passing the Carousel square in front of the palace, de Soucy left Lambriquet to fetch a coach. When she was away, a rebel mistook Ernestine for Marie Thérèse and threw the corpse of a member of the Swiss Guard in front of her feet, but a shop-keeper defended her, also believing she was Marie Thérèse.

=== Later life and death ===
During the reign of Maximilien Robespierre, she was taken care of by the family of de Soucy's father, the Mackau family. Her biological father, Jacques Lambriquet, was arrested in March and executed in 9 July 1794 for his connection to Louis XVI.

On September 2, 1796, Ernestine Lambriquet was released from legal guardianship and declared competent to manage her own affairs.

Ernestine Lambriquet, under the name of Marie Philippine Lambriquet, married a widower called Jean-Charles-Germain Prempain, a proprietor in Paris on 7 December 1810.

She died on 30 December 1813, in Saint Denis Arrondissement, Paris, aged 35. The death certificate records her parents as Jacques Lambriquet and Marie Philippine Noirot. She had no children.

== Switch theory ==
A theory claims that Marie-Thérèse of France, daughter of Louis XVI and Marie Antoinette, swapped identities with her adoptive sister, Ernestine Lambriquet, when she was released from the Temple.

When Marie Thérèse was released from Temple in 1795 and allowed to depart for Austria, Renée Suzanne de Soucy was chosen to accompany her on her journey to the border in Huningue after her mother Marie Angélique de Mackau, who had been the first choice of Marie-Therese, was forced to decline because of health. Marie-Therese, who travelled under the name Sophie, sat in the carriage with de Soucy and the guards Mechin (posing as the father of Sophie) and Gomin; the male servants Hue and Baron, the cook Meunier, as well as the maid Catherine de Varenne and a teenage boy called Pierre de Soucy followed them in the next carriage. According to the switch theory of the Dunkelgrafen, Renée Suzanne de Soucy assisted Marie-Therese in changing place with Ernestine de Lambriquet during the trip to Austria in 1795–96.

Among the eight people accompanying Marie-Therese during her trip through France in 1795, the maid Catherine de Varenne and the teenage boy Pierre de Soucy are mentioned in the passports but are otherwise impossible to identify. Pierre de Soucy is stated in the passport to be the son of Renée Suzanne de Soucy, but she had no son by that name. According to the Switch theory, Pierre de Soucy (or possibly Catherine de Varenne) was in fact Ernestine de Lambriquet, who switched place with Marie-Therese during the journey with the assistance of Renée Suzanne de Soucy, after which Ernestine de Lambriquet continued to Austria posing as Marie-Therese while Marie-Therese herself settled in Germany as the Dunkelgräfin.

The Austrian emperor had in fact requested for Ernestine de Lambriquet to be allowed to accompany Marie-Therese to Austria, but Minister Benezch had given the reply that Ernestine de Lambriquet could not be located. In reality, however, there would not have been any trouble to locate Ernestine de Lambriquet, as she had lived under the protection of Renée Suzanne de Soucy and the Mackau family since the storming of the Tuileries. The alternative suggestion is that "Pierre de Soucy" was in fact one of the daughters of Renée Suzanne de Soucy, dressed as a boy to make the travel group less identifiable, as Marie-Therese was thought to be threatened not only by anti-royalists but also by agents sent by foreign powers to kidnap her during her journey to the border.

Theories as to why Marie-Thérèse made the switch abound; she is speculated to have been raped and gotten pregnant or to have suffered trauma and wanted to disappear.

According to the theory, she became the 'Dark Countess', who resided at Hildburghausen in Thuringia, Germany. The Dark Countess, called Sophia Botta by the Count she was living with, went out in public with a veil only over her face or in a carriage. She died at Hildburghausen on 28 November 1837 and was buried quickly and discreetly. Her companion, Leonardus Cornelius Van Der Valck (called the Dark Count) lived there until his death on 8 April 1845.

=== DNA evidence ===
DNA analysis conducted in 2013 has disproved the conjecture that the Dark Countess was the true Princess Marie-Thérèse Charlotte of France.

The remains of the Dark Countess were exhumed, and bone fragments were analyzed at independent laboratories in Innsbruck, Austria, and Freiburg, Germany. Mitochondrial DNA (mtDNA) genome was sequenced. MtDNA is solely maternally inherited (mother to child) and there are numerous copies of the mtDNA genome in each human cell, making this DNA type useful for the analysis of ancient tissue samples.

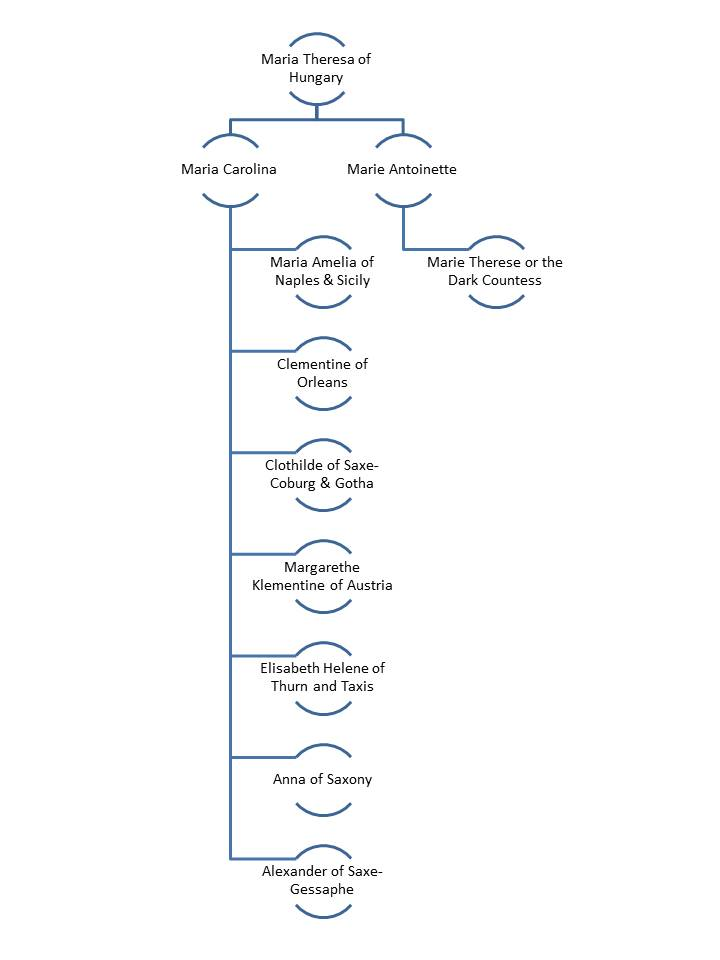
Maternal genealogical lines showing relationship between Marie Therese Charlotte (daughter of Marie Antoinette) and Alexander, Prince of Saxe-Gessaphe.

Princess Marie Thérèse (the presumed identity of the Dark Countess) and the living reference, Alexander, Prince of Saxe-Gessaphe, a maternal descendant of Marie Antoinette’s sister, Archduchess Maria Carolina of Austria, were compared. Although separated by six generations, the maternal inheritance of mtDNA means that there is no recombination at each generation; hence it remains the same. If the Dark Countess was truly Marie-Thérèse, the bone fragments would have had the same mtDNA profile as Alexander (whose maternal line crosses with Marie Antoinette’s mother, Maria Theresa of Austria).

However, the analysis indicated that was not the case. The mtDNA profile from the Dark Countess differed significantly from Prince Alexander. Furthermore, the mtDNA of Marie Thérèse’s brother (Louis-Charles) determined in a previous study matched that of Prince Alexander, as expected, but differed from the Dark Countess.

== Fiction ==
- Korte, Michiel B.L. Ernestine. Self-Published (2022) ISBN 979-8-41397620-3
