= Jean Amilcar =

Foster son of Louis XVI (1781–1796)

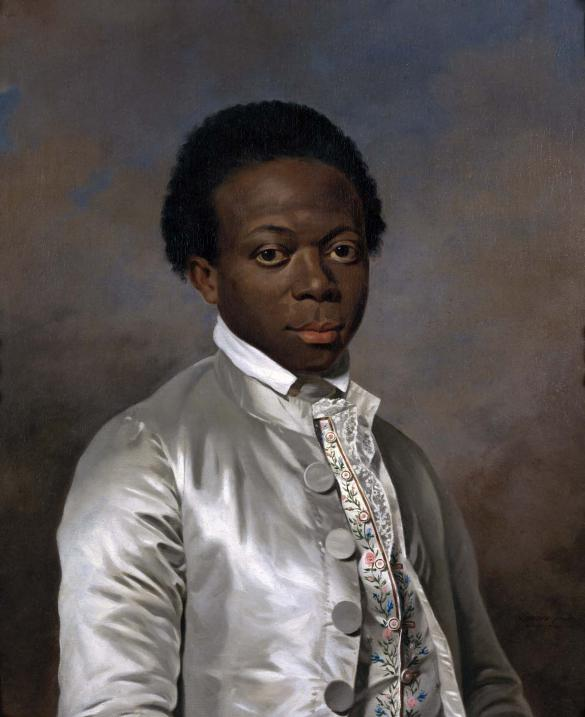
- Born: c. 1781; French Senegal
- Died: 1796; Paris
- Known for: Adopted son of Marie Antoinette

Jean Amilcar (c. 1781–1796) was the adopted son (foster child) of King Louis XVI and Queen Marie Antoinette of France.

Jean Amilcar was from French Senegal. He was enslaved as a child and then bought from local slavers by the French official Chevalier de Boufflers, who wished to spare him the deadly transatlantic crossing. When Chevalier de Boufflers returned to France in 1787, he brought with him Amilcar, and presented him to the Queen, Marie Antoinette, as a 'gift'.

The Queen had him manumitted, baptised and adopted; that is, he became her foster child. He was not the first child taken in as a foster child by Marie Antoinette. In contrast to the Queen's other foster children Armand Gagné, Ernestine Lambriquet, and 'Zoë' Jeanne Louise Victoire, he was not kept at court. The Queen, at her own expense, had him placed in a boarding school at Saint-Cloud. Marie Antoinette kept paying for him even after the outbreak of the French Revolution of 1789, and he remained at the boarding school.

When Marie Antoinette was imprisoned in 1792, she could no longer pay his fee. This resulted in Jean Amilcar being expelled from school. The traditional assumption has been that after he was turned out from the boarding school he starved to death on the street. However, later research has proven this to be false. Jean, by that time eleven years old, was taken care of by one of his teachers, Quentin Beldon, who successfully applied to the government to provide for Jean's schooling with reference to the support the Revolutionary government granted to people who had been enslaved during the former regime. Displaying a talent for drawing, Jean Amilcar was able to enroll at the Liancourt Academy in Paris with state support in 1796. However, he died from an illness in a hospital in Paris later that same year.

== See also ==
- Zamor
- Gustav Badin, similarly adopted by the queen of Sweden
- List of slaves
