= Fitte de Soucy =

Fitte de Soucy may refer to:

- Armand Louis Joseph de Fitte de Soucy (1796–1862), French soldier and governor of Martinique
- François Louis de Fitte (1751–1793), French royalist general during the French Revolution
- Louis Xavier de Fitte de Soucy (1775–1840), French landowner, diplomat and politician
- Marie Angélique de Mackau née de Fitte de Soucy (1723-1801), French court office holder
- Renée Suzanne de Soucy (1758–1841), wife of François-Louis de Fitte de Soucy, French court office holder
