= Bombelles =

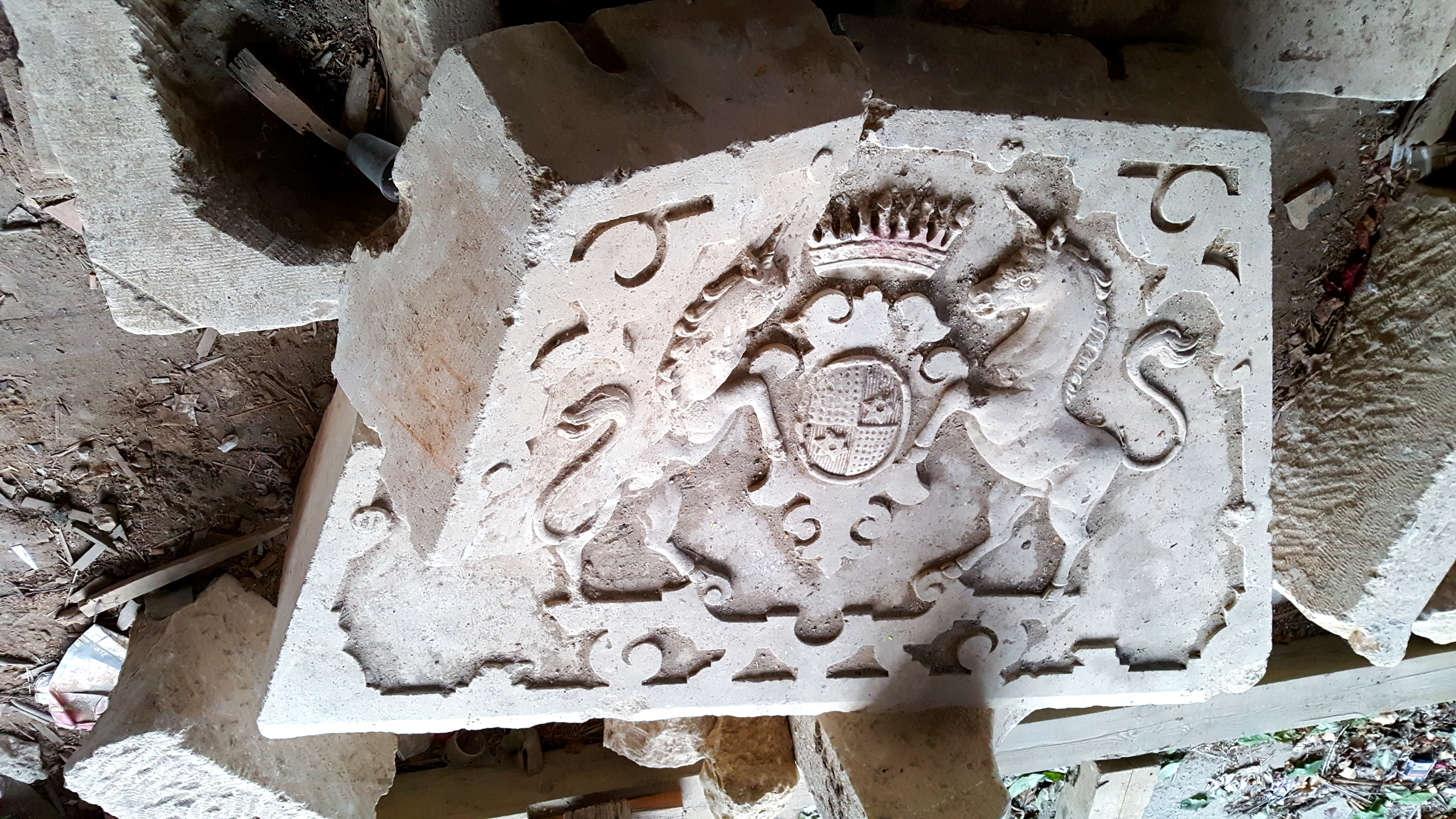
Coat of arms of the Bombelles family on the walls of Opeka castle

The Bombelles family is an old aristocratic family which originated in the Duchy of Lorraine. Members of the family later settled in the Holy Roman Empire and in Portugal. They held the title of Marquis in France and the title of Count in Austria.

== Notable members ==
- Countess Johanna Henriette de Bombelles (1751–1822), second wife of Landgrave of Hesse-Rotenburg
- Jeanne Renee de Bombelles (1753–1828), composer
- Count Karl von Bombelles, master of Archduke Rudolf in 1877, and imperial custodian of the Empress of Mexico.
- Marc Marie, Marquis de Bombelles (1744–1822), diplomat and bishop
- His son Louis Philippe de Bombelles (1780–1843), diplomat
- Charles-René de Bombelles (6 November 1784–30 May 1856), French émigré nobleman, soldier, and the third husband of Marie Louise, Duchess of Parma.
