= Louis Xavier de Fitte de Soucy =

French landowner and diplomat

Deputy for Seine-et-Oise
- In office 21 June 1834 – 29 September 1840

Personal details
- Born: 28 February 1775 Vitry-sur-Seine, Val-de-Marne, France
- Died: 29 September 1840 (aged 65) Auvernaux, Essonne. France
- Spouse(s): Catherine Élisabeth Colson (m. 1795, wid. 1833)
- Relations: Louis Philippe de Bombelles (first cousin); Charles-René de Bombelles (first cousin)
- Children: Louis Joseph de Soucy (son); Hyppolite Aimée de Soucy (daughter); Philippe Babolin de Soucy (son)
- Parent(s): François Louis de Soucy (father); Renée Suzanne de Soucy (mother)
- Occupation: Landowner, diplomat, politician

Louis Xavier de Fitte de Soucy (or Defitte; 28 February 1775 – 29 September 1840) was a French landowner, a diplomat during the French First Republic and First French Empire, and a deputy during the July Monarchy. He was the son of François Louis and Renée Suzanne de Soucy, an intimate of King Louis XVI and Marie Antoinette, who had been governess to their children.

== Early years ==
Louis Xavier Defitte was born on 28 February 1775 in Vitry-sur-Seine, Val-de-Marne. His family had long belonged to the noblesse de robe of Paris and included officials in finance and also members of the army. The first record is of Pierre de Ficte, or de Fitte, of Bruyères-le-Châtel, seigneur de Soucy, a treasury official in 1552–67 and secretary of King Henry III of France before 1580. Louis Xavier's father, François Louis de Fitte de Soucy (1751–1793), Marquis de Soucy, committed suicide in 1793 to avoid arrest and the guillotine. His mother, Renée Suzanne Marie Louise Dirkeim de Mackau (1758–1841), was under-governess of the children of Louis XVI, and then of his brother, the future Louis XVIII. His uncle was Armand Louis de Mackau (1759–1827), a lieutenant colonel of the dragoons who served as the king's minister at Stuttgart and Naples. Louis Xavier Defitte studied at the Collège de Lisieux.

== Revolution and Empire ==
Louis-Xavier Defitte was admitted to the Order of Malta in 1791. In 1791 Defitte joined the Angoumois regiment and served in the company of Godefroy de La Tour d'Auvergne. In April 1792 he followed his uncle, the Minister Plenipotentiary Mackau, to the French legation in Naples. He then personally filled several missions for the armies of Italy and the Rhine. He married Catherine Elisabeth Colson around 1794. Their children were Armand Louis Joseph de Fitte de Soucy, Hippolyte Aimée and Philippe Babolin. In 1802 Defitte was sent to Portugal as secretary of the legation of General Jean Lannes. After his return he and Lannes tried to dissuade Napoleon from war in Spain. When they failed to convince the emperor Defitte retired to the country. On 7 April 1813 he was appointed sub-prefect of Cambrai, and held this position during the allied invasion of France in 1814. His arrondissement did not suffer from enemy troops.

== Bourbon Restoration and July Monarchy ==
After the Bourbon Restoration of 1814 Defitte was left destitute, and complained bitterly to the Minister of the Interior Montesquiou. He then retired to his country property at Auvernaux, Seine-et-Oise, until the July Revolution of 1830. He became a member of the Corbeil district council and of the departmental council of Seine-et-Oise. Defitte was elected to the Chamber of Deputies for Seine-et-Oise on 21 June 1834. He sat with the center left. He voted against the September law and the law of disjunction. He was made a Knight of the Legion of Honour on 6 June 1835. He was reelected on the same platform on 4 November 1837 and 2 March 1839, holding office until his death. He was particularly involved in agricultural topics, and fought the tobacco monopoly. Defitte died on 29 September 1840 in the Château De Porte, Auvernaux.

== Sources ==
- Chaix d'Est-Ange, Eustace (1903), "FITTE de SOUCY (de)", Dictionnaire des familles françaises anciennes ou notables à la fin du XIXe siècle (in French), vol. 18, Évreux: Charles Hérissey
- "FITTE DE, Louis Xavier", Base Léonore (in French), Archives nationales
- Garric, Alain, "Louis Xavier DE FITTE DE SOUCY", Geneanet (in French)
- Garric (b), Alain, "Armand Louis DE MACKAU", Geneanet (in French)
- Louis, Xavier Defitte (in French), Assemblée nationale
- Robert, Adolphe; Cougny, Gaston (1889). "Defitte, Louis Xavier". Dictionnaire des parlementaires français de 1789 à 1889 (in French). National Assembly of France.
