= Étienne-Charles de Damas-Crux =

French soldier and politician

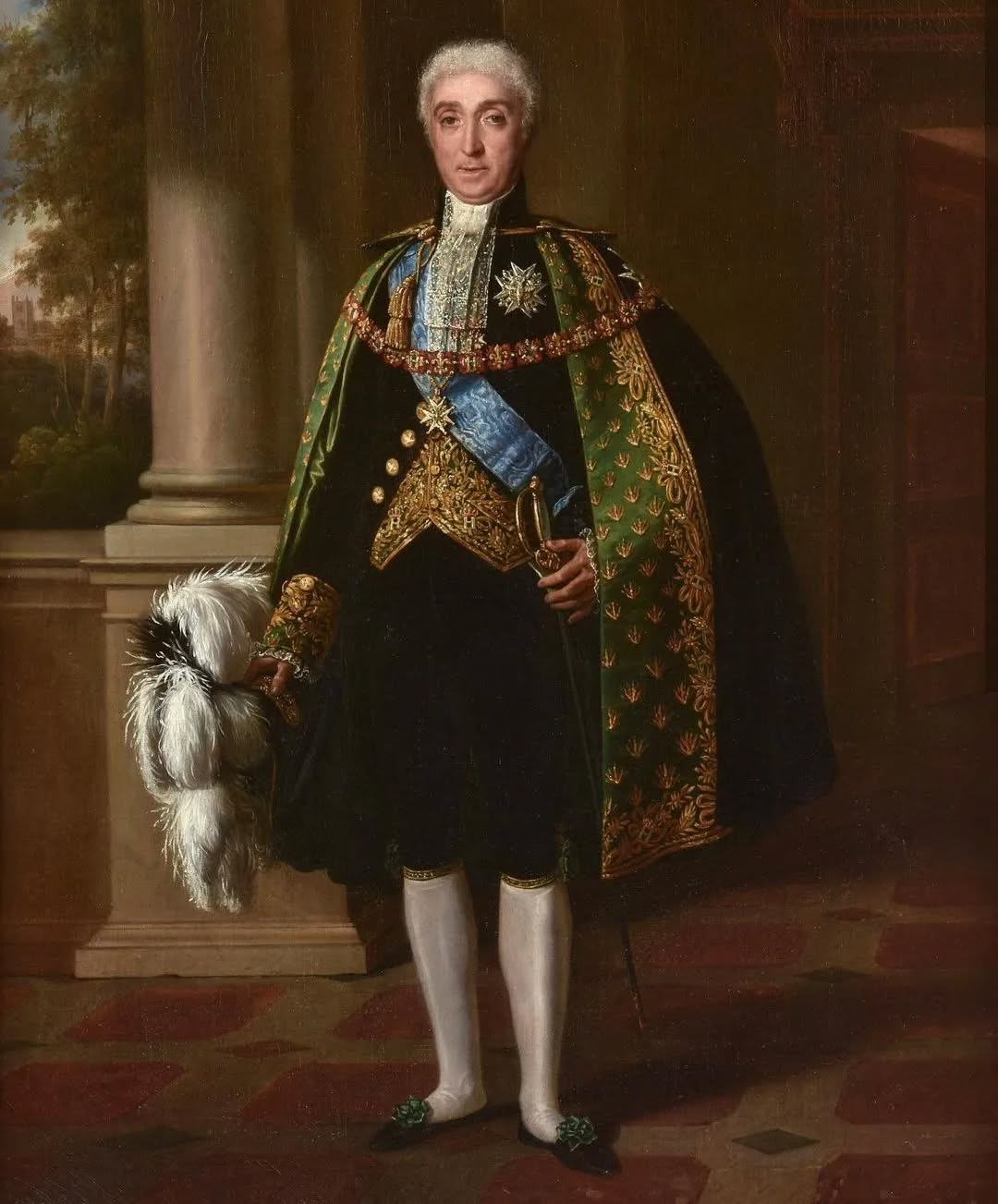
- Portrait engraving of Damas-Crux
- Born: 10 February 1754; Château de Crux, Nivernais, France
- Died: 29 May 1846 (aged 92); Paris, France
- Military career
- Allegiance: Kingdom of France
- Branch: (Kingdom of France) French Army
- Service years: 1770–1832
- Rank: Lieutenant General
- Units: Ancien Régime: Regiment of Limousin (1770–1779); Regiment of Aquitaine (1779–1784); Regiment of Vexin (1784–1791) French Revolutionary Wars: Legion of Damas (1793–1796); Army of Condé (1796–1801) Bourbon Restoration: 11th Infantry Division (1815–1815); 25th Corsica Division (1815–1816); 2nd Infantry Division (1816–1832)
- Conflicts: American Revolutionary War; French Revolutionary Wars; Napoleonic Wars
- Awards: Order of the Holy Spirit; Order of Saint Louis

Étienne-Charles, Duke of Damas-Crux (10 February 1754 - 29 May 1846) was a French soldier and politician.

He derived from one of France's oldest noble families, the House of Damas - he was the last son of Louis Alexandre de Damas, count of Crux (died 1763), and his wife Marie-Louise (1712-1796), daughter of François-Charles, marquis of Menou (1671-1731). He became a brigadier des armées du roi and was received into the Knights of Malta.

== Early life ==
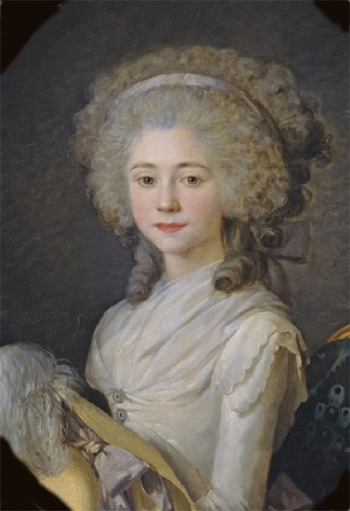
Anne-Félicité-Simone de Sérent by Antoine Vestier, 1788.

Étienne-Charles was born in 1754 at the Château de Crux in Nivernais, the last son of Louis Alexandre de Damas, Count of Crux (died in 1763) and of Marie-Louise de Menou (1712-1796), daughter of François-Charles, Marquis of Menou (1671-1731). He was received from youth into the Order of St. John of Jerusalem but never pronounced his vows as Knight, which later permitted him to marry.

In 1799 he married Anne-Félicité-Simone (Paris, 15 January 1772 - Paris, 25 January 1848), daughter of Armand-Louis de Sérent, Duke of Sérent and Bonne Marie Félicité de Montmorency-Luxembourg, dame d'atour to Princess Élisabeth of France in 1776–92, and dame d'honneur to Marie Thérèse of France in 1799–1823.

== Military career ==
=== Early service ===
Étienne-Charles de Damas-Crux joined the Régiment de Limousin as a second lieutenant on 22 February 1770 and rose to captain in the same regiment on 5 May 1772. He was made second in command of the Régiment d'Aquitaine on 3 October 1779 and fought with that regiment on all its campaigns in the East Indies during the American War of Independence. He was also put in command of a sepoy regiment, and when one day this unit panicked and fled, Damas-Crux remained on the battlefield almost alone and was finally overrun and captured. Peace was concluded between France and Britain soon after his capture, enabling him to return to France, where he became a mestre-de-camp, commanding the Régiment de Vexin in 1784.

=== French Revolution ===
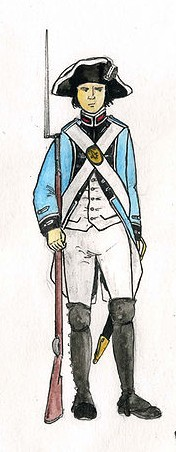
Uniform of the Légion de Damas

On the French Revolution, Damas-Crux backed the king and emigrated - part of the Vexin regiment came to join him from the Principality of Monaco, and these men fought under his command in the 1792 campaign. In 1793, he raised the émigré 'Légion de Damas', leading it on the campaigns that year in the Netherlands. When the French Revolutionary Army invaded the Netherlands, the legion passed into British pay. The unit wished to land in western France, but this led to its infantry being largely destroyed on 21 July during the Quiberon expedition. In 1796, Damas-Crux concluded a surrender with the Prince of Condé that allowed Damas-Crux to form a squadron of hussars out of the remains of his legion - he then commanded this squadron as part of the Army of Condé.

In 1795 Louis XVIII (or the Count of Artois) had promoted Damas-Crux to maréchal-de-camp. He followed Condé's army to Poland in 1801 and he and Condé joined the Russian army the following year. Damas-Crux was the Duke of Angoulême's attaché in Russia, as first gentleman of the chamber, and accompanied him from Mittau to join Condé's army, then to Warsaw and finally to England.

=== Bourbon Restoration ===
He finally returned to France in March 1814 with the Coalition armies and joined the Duke of Angoulême in his trip to the MIDI, "helping him in his counsels and his arms" on all occasions. On the following 21 March (or 22 June) he was made Lieutenant General and on 22 August 1814 a knight grand cross of the Order of Saint Louis. He initially accompanied the Duke of Angoulême during the Hundred Days. He was sent to Toulouse as a royal commissioner alongside Eugène François d'Arnauld, but was arrested by order of General de Laborde and conducted to the Spanish frontier. He then rejoined the Duke of Angoulême in Madrid, from which he was sent to Tolosa and Irun to enlist French Royalists there. De Damas-Crux entered Bayonne on 25 July, escorted by 1,800 Basques who he had recruited. He had refused all help from the Spanish general Enrique José O'Donnell, who had offered to put his force under de Damas-Crux's orders. After Napoleon's defeat, de Damas-Crux was made governor of the 11th and 20th military divisions and commander of the Army of the Pyrénées.

On 17 July 1815 he was made a peer of France, voting for the death sentence for Michel Ney. On 3 February 1816 he was made a duke in return for his services during the Napoleonic Wars and took an oath to obey the royal court at that rank on 19 February. He was made a knight of the Order of the Holy Spirit in Paris on 5 February 1824, taking this up formally on 14 May 1826. On 26 September 1815 he was replaced as commander of the 11th military division by Antoine-Louis-Marie de Gramont, moving instead to the 25th division (Corsica) and then on 10 January 1816 to the 2nd military division. In March 1816 the Duke of Angoulême gave him various missions in the Midi, which he completed - the measures he took, however, undermined the royal family's in that area.

De Damas-Crux retired from the upper chamber after the July Revolution, after remaining faithful to the old government and refusing to take an oath to obey the new one. He retired from the army at the rank of lieutenant general on 30 June 1832 and died in Paris in 1846. He and his wife had no issue so the Damas-Crux branch (senior branch of the House of Damas) died out with him - he had taken measures to be succeeded in the peerage by Alexandre de Damas, but since Étienne-Charles had been dismissed from the peerage for refusing to take the oath to Louis Philippe his heir could not sit in the House of Peers.
