= Wartegg Castle =

Castle in Rorschacherberg, Switzerland

- Schloss Wartegg (German)
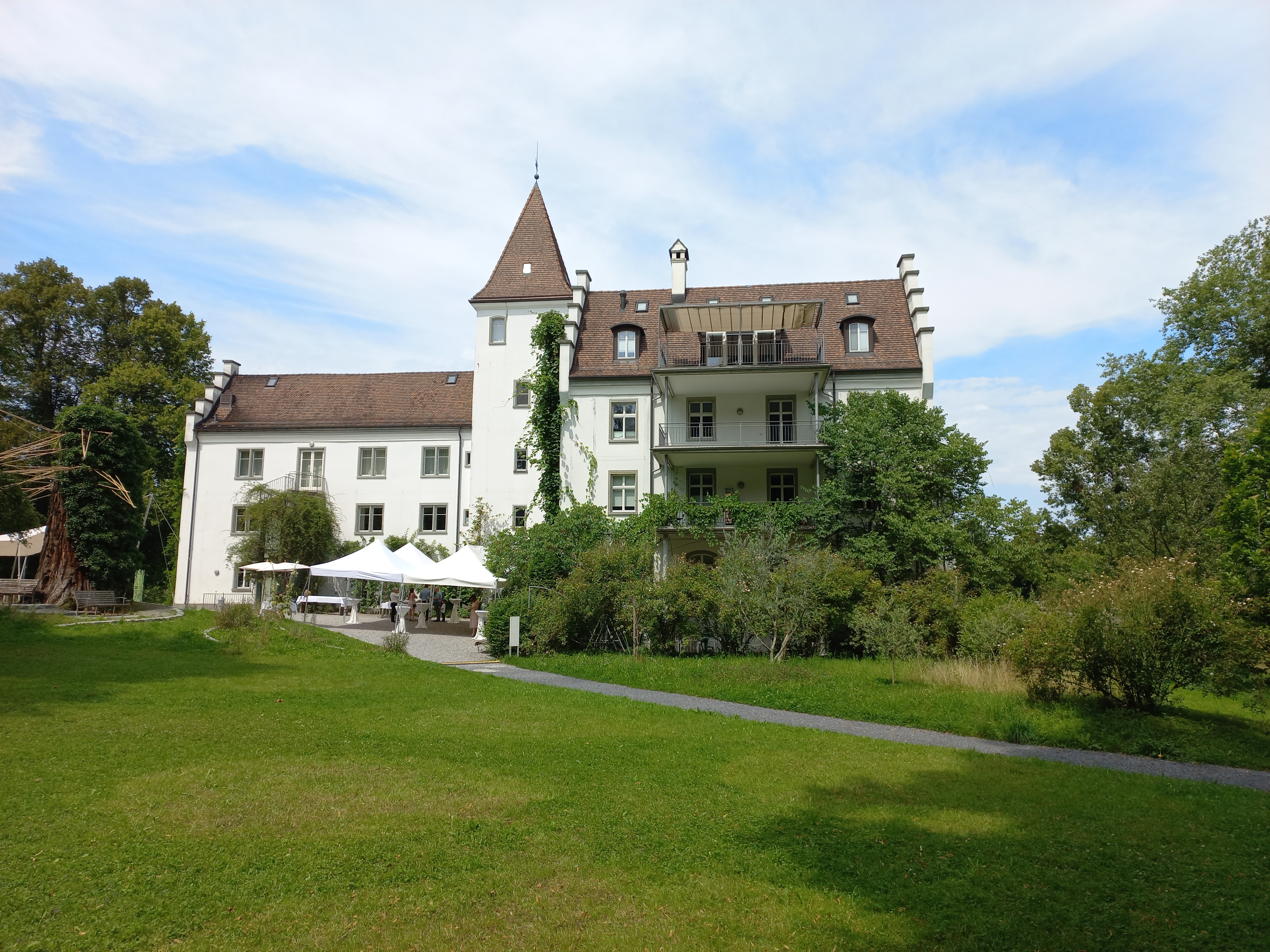
- The castle in 2021
- Interactive map of Wartegg Castle
- 47.4785°N 9.5301°E
- Location: Rorschacherberg, St. Gallen, Switzerland

History
- Built: 1557

Site notes
- Website: wartegg.ch

Wartegg Castle (German: Schloss Wartegg) is a castle in Rorschacherberg, Switzerland. It was built in 1557 and served as a residence for various exiled European aristocrats and royals including the Marquis and Marquise de Bombelles, Princess Louise d'Artois, and Empress Zita and Emperor Charles I of Austria.

== History ==
The castle was built in 1557 for Kaspar Blarer von Wartensee, the bailiff of Arbon under the Diocese of Constance and brother of Prince Abbot Diethelm Blarer von Wartensee.

In 1659, the castle belonged to Sebastian Peregrin Zwyer von Evibach.

In 1676, it was acquired by Fidel von Thurn und Valsassina, the Lord Chamberlain of the Prince Abbot of St. Gall, and remained in the Thurn und Valsassina family until 1823.

In 1789, during the French Revolution, the diplomat and aristocrat Marc Marie, Marquis de Bombelles and his family fled France and took up residence in the castle. The marquis de Bombelle's wife, Marie-Angélique de Bombelles, had served as a lady-in-waiting to Princess Élisabeth of France, sister of King Louis XVI, at the Palace of Versailles prior to the revolution.

In 1860, the castle was purchased by Princess Louise d'Artois, Duchess of Parma and Piacenza and served as her home in exile. Princess Louise's granddaughter, Zita of Bourbon-Parma, lived at Wartegg with her husband, Emperor Charles I of Austria, and their children from March 24, 1919 to May 20, 1919, during their first weeks of exile following the Dissolution of Austria-Hungary. In 1924, the Bourbon-Parma family sold the property.

In 1929, it was purchased by the German industrialist Gustav Mez and he sold it in the 1950s. The Mijnssen family purchased the property in the 1994.

== Bibliography ==
- Brook-Shepherd, Gordon. (1991). The Last Empress: The Life and Times of Zita of Austria-Hungary 1893–1989. Harper-Collins. ISBN 0-00-215861-2
