= Dunkelgrafen =

Early 19th century wealthy German couple

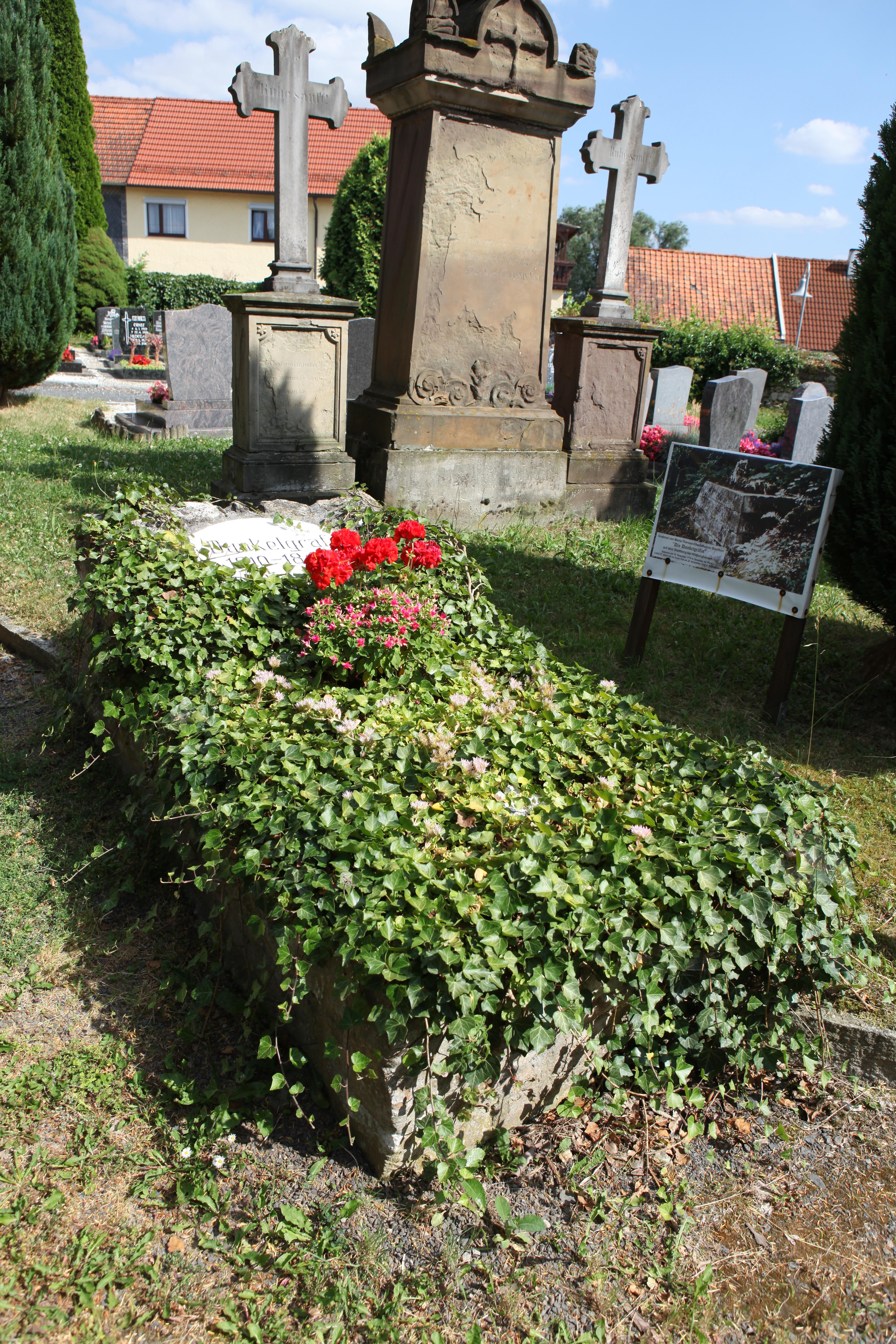
Grave of the Dunkelgraf in Eishausen

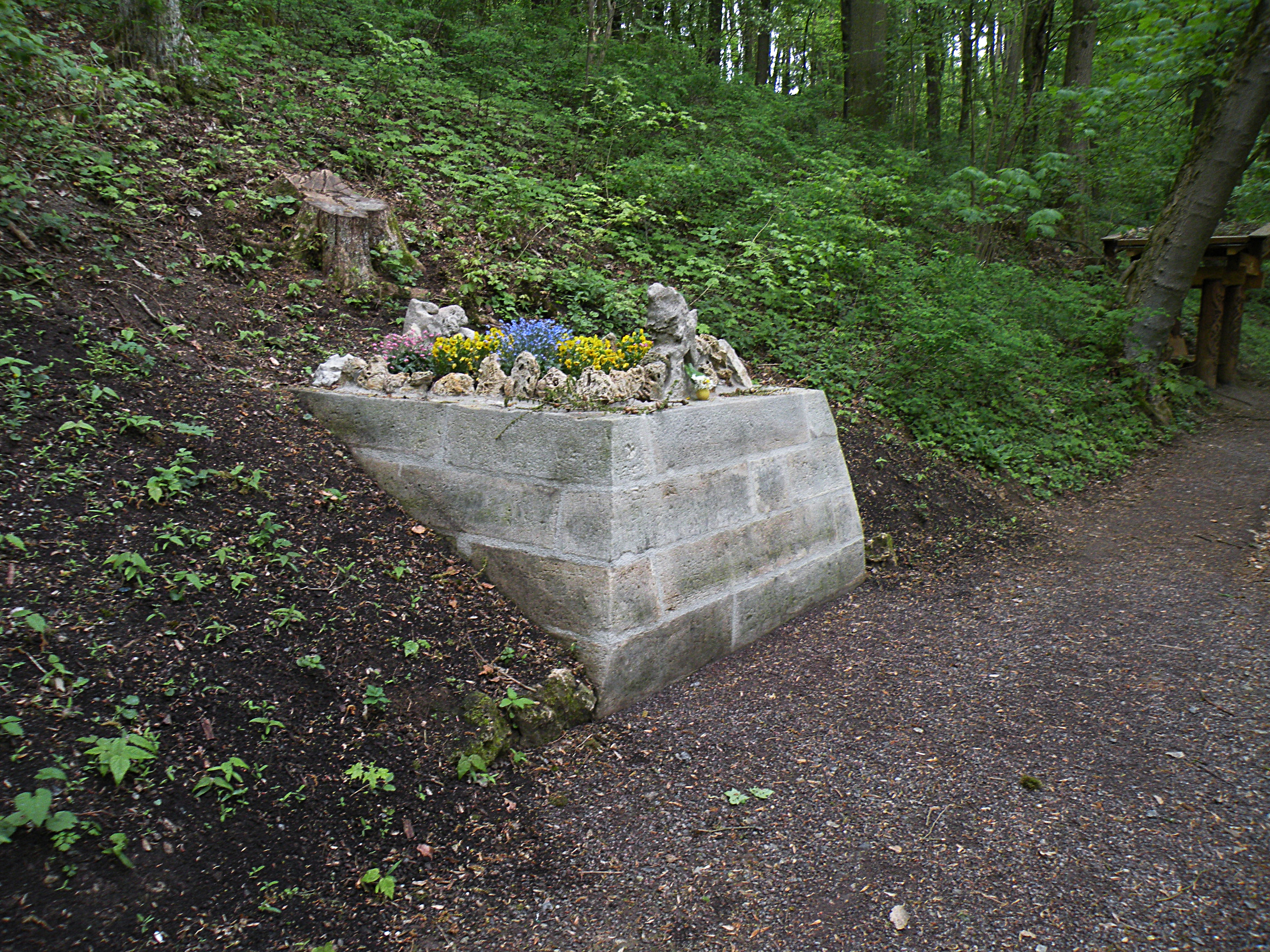
Grave of the Dunkelgräfin near Hildburghausen

The Dunkelgrafen (French: Comte et Comtesse des Ténèbres, lit. 'Dark Counts' in German) was the nickname given to a wealthy couple who lived in the vicinity of Hildburghausen, Thuringia, in the early 19th century. The man was identified as Leonardus Cornelius van der Valck (1769–1845), and used the alias Count Vavel de Versay. The woman was identified as Sophie Botta (c. 1777–1837).

== Life ==
The Dunkelgräfin (Dark Countess) arrived in Hildburghausen on February 7, 1807. In 1810, they moved into the nearby but secluded Eishausen castle, where they stayed until their deaths. The man presented himself as Count Vavel de Versay and kept the woman’s identity secret, making only clear that they were neither married nor lovers.

They led a secretive life, particularly the Countess, who ventured out only in a carriage or with a veil covering her face. At her death (November 28, 1837) she was inhumed very quickly, possibly without a religious service. The Count – later identified as Leonardus Cornelius van der Valck (born September 2, 1769, in Amsterdam), secretary in the Dutch embassy in Paris from July 1798 to April 1799 – gave her name as Sophie Botta, a single woman from Westphalia; according to Dr. Lommler, the physician who constated her death, she looked about 60 years of age, placing her estimated birth at c. 1777. She was buried in a grave on Schulersberg hill, in a garden which the Dunkelgräfin had bought in 1820.

The Count stayed in the castle and died there on April 8, 1845. He was buried in the churchyard of Eishausen. The castle in which the Dunkelgräfin had lived was demolished in 1873.

== Theories ==
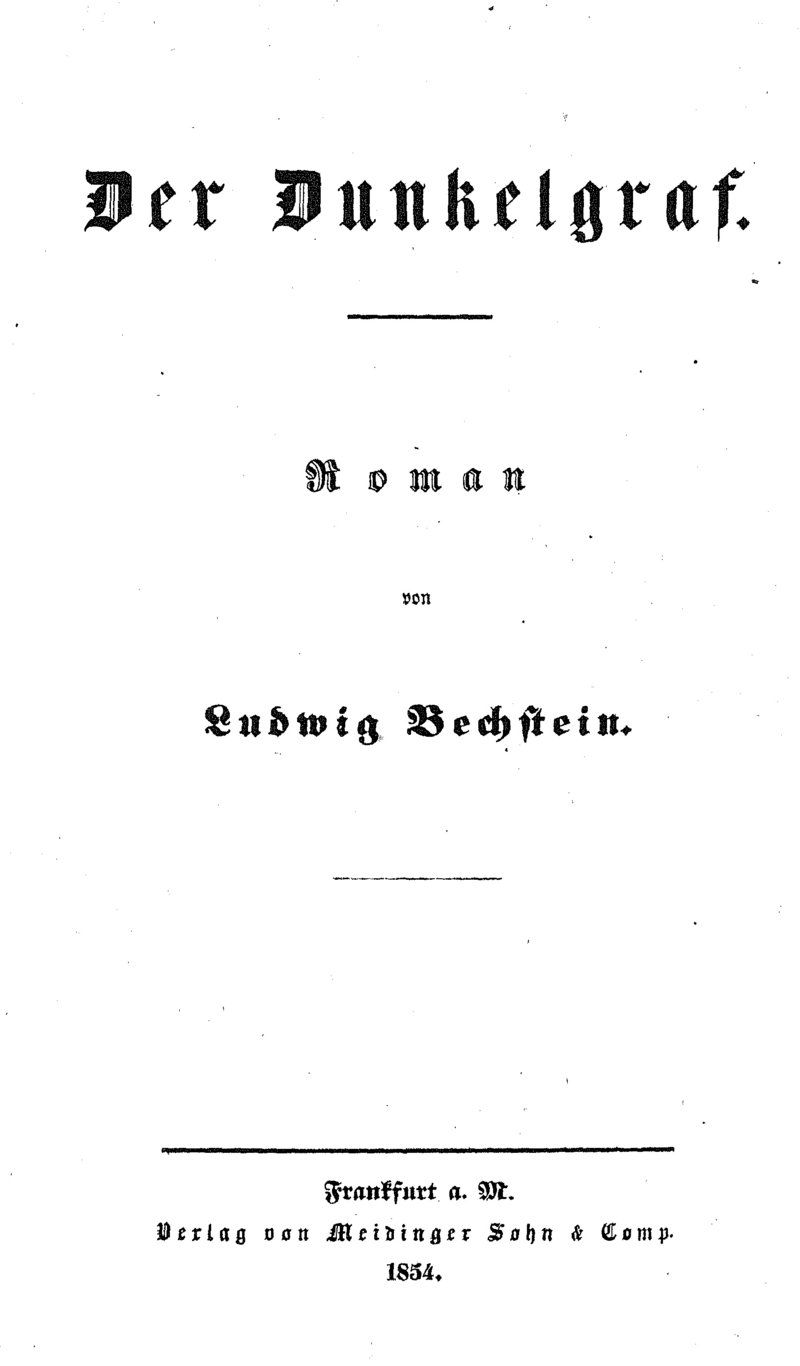
Title page of Bechstein's novel Der Dunkelgraf

The mysterious couple sparked much interest, and speculations about the identity of the Countess started early on. The most notable – with very little support from historians though – proposes that she would be the true Marie-Thérèse, daughter of Marie Antoinette, imprisoned in the Temple and supposedly redeemed in 1795 in exchange for French prisoners. According to this hypothesis, Marie-Thérèse, traumatized by her trials or pregnant by rape, would have refused to go back in the world; her adoptive sister (and possible half sister), Ernestine de Lambriquet, would have taken her place.

When Marie Thérèse was released from Temple in 1795 and allowed to depart for Austria, Renée Suzanne de Soucy was chosen to accompany her on her journey to the border in Huningue after her mother Marie Angélique de Mackau, who had been the first choice of Marie-Therese, was forced to decline for health reasons. Marie-Therese, who traveled under the name Sophie, sat in the carriage with de Soucy and the guards Mechin (posing as the father of Sophie) and Gomin; the male servants Hue and Baron, the cook Meunier, the maid Catherine de Varenne and a teenage boy called Pierre de Soucy followed them in the next carriage. According to the legendary switch theory of the Dunkelgräfin, Renée Suzanne de Soucy assisted Marie-Therese in changing place with Ernestine de Lambriquet during the trip to Austria in 1795-1796.

Among the eight people accompanying Marie-Therese during her trip through France in 1795, Catherine de Varenne and Pierre de Soucy are mentioned in the passports, but are otherwise impossible to identify. Pierre de Soucy is stated in the passport to be the son of Renée Suzanne de Soucy, but she had no son by that name. According to the Switch theory, Pierre de Soucy (or possibly Catherine de Varenne) was in fact Ernestine de Lambriquet, who switched place with Marie-Therese during the journey with the assistance of Renée Suzanne de Soucy, after which Ernestine de Lambriquet continued to Austria posing as Marie-Therese, while Marie-Therese herself settled in Germany as the Dunkelgräfin.

The Austrian Emperor had, in fact, requested that Ernestine de Lambriquet should be allowed to accompany Marie-Therese to Austria, but Minister Benezch had given the reply that Ernestine de Lambriquet could not be located. In reality, however, there would not have been any trouble to locate Ernestine de Lambriquet, as she had lived under the protection of Renée Suzanne de Soucy and the Mackau family since the storming of the Tuileries on the 10th of August, 1792. The alternative suggestion is that "Pierre de Soucy" was in fact one of the daughters of Renée Suzanne de Soucy, dressed as a boy in order to make the travel group less identifiable, as Marie-Therese was estimated to have been exposed to threats not only from anti-royalists but also from agents sent by foreign powers to kidnap her during her journey to the border. It is a fact that Renée Suzanne de Soucy exposed Marie-Therese to blackmail for unclear reasons, blackmail Marie-Therese submitted to, which has been speculated to have the connection to this alleged switch.

According to Mme. von Heimbruch, her lady in waiting, Queen Mary of Hanover believed that the Dunkelgräfin was a Princess of Condé.

== Legacy ==
The Dunkelgräfin is the theme of numerous historical essays and fictions in German and French, among them a novel by Ludwig Bechstein.

== Investigation ==
On 15 October 2013, the remains of the Dunkelgräfin were exhumed for DNA tests. She was solemnly reburied on November 7, 2013. DNA analysis and a study of her reconstructed facial features clearly confirmed that she was not related to Marie-Therese.

== Bibliography ==
- Belcroix, Cyr (1999). Autour de Louis XVII : la comtesse des ténèbres. La Chapelle-la-Reine: le Relais. ISBN 978-2902693481.
- Richard Boehmker: Das Geheimnis um eine Königstochter. Die Lösung des mehr als 100jährigen Rätsels von Hildburghausen. Helingsche VA, Leipzig 1937
- Siebert, A. E. Brachvogel. Neu hrsg. von Theodor (1990). Das Rätsel von Hildburghausen : Roman (Reprint der Ausg. Berlin, Globus-Verl., [1925] ed.). Hildburghausen: Verl. Frankenschwelle. ISBN 3-86180-015-2.
- Lilienstern, Helga Rühle v. (1997). Dunkelgraf und Dunkelgräfin im Spiegel von Zeugen und Mitwissern (1. Aufl. ed.). Hildburghausen: Verl. Frankenschwelle. ISBN 3861800675.
- Lilienstern, Helga Rühle v. (2003). Die Unbekannten von Eishausen : Dunkelgraf und Dunkelgräfin im Spiegel zeitgenössischer Veröffentlichungen (4. Aufl. ed.). Hildburghausen: Verl. Frankenschwelle. ISBN 386180056X.
- Salier, Helga Rühle von Lilienstern; Hans-Jürgen (2008). Das grosse Geheimnis von Hildburghausen auf den Spuren der Dunkelgräfin (1. Aufl. ed.). Leipzig: Salier. ISBN 978-3-939611-19-6.
- Lannoy, Mark de (2007). Das Geheimnis des Dunkelgrafen : war Prinzessin Marie Thérèse Charlotte de Bourbon seine Begleiterin?. Norderstedt: Books on Demand. ISBN 978-3833468476.
