= François Louis de Fitte =

François Louis de Fitte de Soucy
- Born: 10 August 1751
- Died: 31 July 1793 (aged 41); Coutances, Manche, French
- Occupation: Soldier

François Louis de Fitte de Soucy (10 August 1751 – 31 July 1793) was a French royalist general who died during the French Revolution.

== Life ==
François Louis de Fitte de Soucy was born on 10 August 1751. His family had long belonged to the noblesse de robe of Paris and included officials in finance and also members of the army. The first record is of Pierre de Ficte, or de Fitte, of Bruyères-le-Châtel, seigneur de Soucy, a treasury official in 1552–67 and secretary of King Henry III of France before 1580. François Louis de Fitte's parents were Armand de Fitte de Soucy and Elisabeth Louise Lenoir (1729–1789). In 1774 he married Renée Suzanne-Marie-Louise de Mackau (born 1758). Their children were Louis Xavier (1775–1840), Charles (1776–1813), Angélique (1779–1792), Philippe (1781) and Louise (1784–1850).

De Fitte belonged to the royalist party in Normandy. In 1781 his wife was sub-governess of the King's children. During the French Revolution on 25 July 1791 he was appointed a colonel of the 80th Infantry Regiment. He was made marechal de camp on 6 February 1792 in the Army of the Cherbourg coasts, where the Duke of La Rochefoucauld had wanted to prepare a retreat for King Louis XVI. He was denounced, arrested and imprisoned at Coutances. On 31 July 1793 he killed himself with a bullet to the head to avoid the guillotine. He died in Coutances, Manche at the age of 42.

== Sources ==
- Broughton, Tony (September 2007), "Generals Who Served in the French Army during the Period 1789 - 1814: Sheldon to Suzamicq", The Napoleon Series
- Chaix d'Est-Ange, Eustace (1903), "FITTE de SOUCY (de)", Dictionnaire des familles françaises anciennes ou notables à la fin du XIXe siècle (in French), vol. 18, Évreux: Charles Hérissey
- "François Louis de Fitte de Soucy", base Roglo (in French)
- "La Restauration", Correspondance-fallou x: BIOGRAPHIE d'ALFRED DE FALLOUX, BIOGRAPHIE & CORRESPONDANCES, De Charles X à Louis-Philippe (in French), 9 May 2013
- Lehr, Ernest (1870), L'Alsace noble: suivie de Le livre d'or du patriciat de Strasbourg (in French), Éditions du Palais Royal
