= Marie-Angélique de Bombelles =

French court office holder (1762–1800)

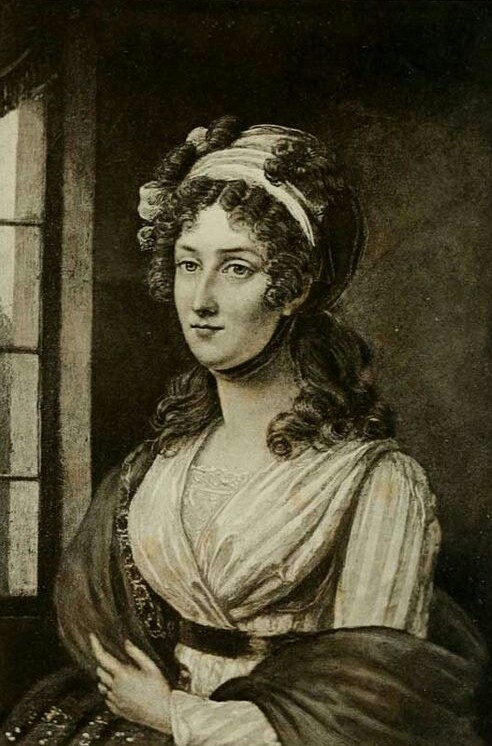
- Born: Marie-Angélique de Mackau; 1762
- Died: 1800 (aged 37–38)
- Occupation: Court office holder
- Spouse: Marc Marie, Marquis de Bombelles

Marie-Angélique Charlotte, Marquise de Bombelles (née de Mackau; 1762– 29 September 1800), was a French court office holder and letter writer. She was maid of honour and a personal friend and confidante of Élisabeth of France (1764–1794), and known in history for her correspondence with her, which is preserved. Her mother Angélique de Mackau and both Angélique and her sister Renée de Soucy were governesses to the royal children.

== Life ==
She was the daughter of Baron Louis Eléonor Dirkheim de Mackau (1727–1767) and Marie-Angélique de Mackau, and the sister of Renée Suzanne de Soucy (1758–1841) and Armand Louis de Mackau (1759–1827). She married her cousin, the diplomat Marc Marie, Marquis de Bombelles in 1778, and became the mother of Louis Philippe de Bombelles, Charles-René de Bombelles and Heinrich Bombelles.

Her mother served as sous gouvernante (governess) to the royal children, and she herself was a playmate of Élisabeth of France during her childhood and then maid-of-honour prior to her marriage. She was a close personal friend and confidante of Élisabeth, and their correspondence is considered a valuable source of the life of the princess.

Marie-Angélique de Bombelles emigrated to Switzerland after the outbreak of the French Revolution in 1789, taking up residence at Wartegg Castle in Rorschacherberg.

== Children ==
1. Louis Philippe de Bombelles (1 July 1780 – 7 July 1843)
2. Bitche de Bombelles (4 March 1783 – 17 October 1805), died in the Battle of Ulm aged 22.
3. Charles René de Bombelles (6 November 1785 – 30 May 1856), who married Marie Louise, Duchess of Parma.
4. Henri François de Bombelles (26 June 1789 – 31 March 1850)
5. Caroline Antoinette de Bombelles (1 March 1794 – 6 March 1861), married Jean Marie de Biaudos de Casteja
6. Victor de Bombelles (1 June 1796 – 29 June 1815), died aged 19.
7. Armand de Bombelles (1800, stillborn)
