= Bonne Marie Félicité de Sérent =

- Duchess of Sérent
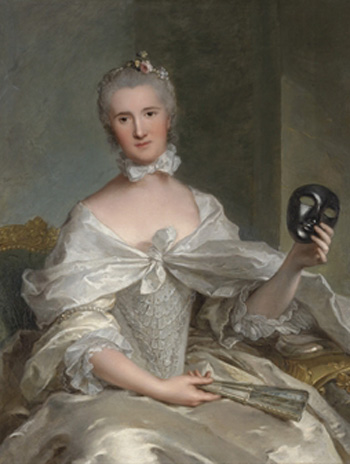
- Portrait by Jean-Marc Nattier, 1754
- Born: 18 February 1739
- Died: 3 July 1823 (aged 84); Paris, France
- Spouses: Armand-Louis de Sérent (m. 1754–1822); his death
- Issue: 4
- Father: Charles Anne Sigismond de Montmorency-Luxembourg
- Mother: Marie-Etiennette de Bullion de Fervaques

Bonne Marie Félicité de Sérent, Duchess of Sérent née de Montmorency-Luxembourg (February 18, 1739 – July 3, 1823), was a French courtier. She served as dame d'atour to Princess Élisabeth of France in 1776–92, and as dame d'honneur to Marie Thérèse of France in 1799–1823.

== Life ==
Bonne Marie Félicité de Sérent was born to duke Charles Anne Sigismond de Montmorency-Luxembourg and Marie-Etiennette de Bullion de Fervaques, and married marquis Armand-Louis de Sérent in 1754. She had four children. She was described as forceful, pious and as a convinced autocrat royalist.

In 1776, she was appointed dame d'atour to Princess Élisabeth of France when Elisabeth left the care of the royal governess and formed her own household. On the outbreak of the French Revolution, she belonged to those courtiers accompanying the royal family from Versailles to Paris after the Women's March on Versailles in October 1789, and continued to serve Elisabeth in the Tuileries.

After the imprisonment of Elisabeth in the Temple in 1792, she kept in contact with her from the outside, even though Elisabeth encouraged her to emigrate for her own safety. Their contact was often made through Jean-Baptiste Cléry, and later through the cook Turgot, who described the matter:

"Mme la Marquise de Sérent was the chief person in whom centred the correspondence of the Queen and Mme Elizabeth. At her house I passed as her man of business, and her servants had orders to let me in at any hour of day or night. It is known what a fine character and what noble devotion this lady showed in all the dangers of the royal family and in so many circumstances full of danger for herself."

Upon the release of Marie Thérèse of France from the Temple in 1795, Sérent, along with Louise-Élisabeth de Croÿ de Tourzel, were both refused to attend to her and accompany her during her departure for Austria.

In 1799, she attended the wedding between Marie Thérèse of France and her cousin the Duke of Angoulême in Mitau in Courland, and was appointed dame d'honneur to Marie Thérèse of France, a position she kept until her death. Her daughter, who had accompanied her, was appointed to the household of Marie Thérèse as well. They accompanied Marie Therese to England in 1808.

In 1814, she returned to France along with the reinstated Bourbon dynasty. She continued to serve as the head lady-in-waiting to Marie Thérèse who, in the absence of a queen, was the first lady of the French court, and headed all the formal court presentations of debutantes. Upon her death in 1823, she was succeeded as dame d'honneur by her daughter Anne-Félicité Simone de Sérent, married to Duke Étienne-Charles de Damas-Crux, who had prior served as her deputy.
