= Jeanne Renee de Bombelles =

French composer and poet

Jeanne-Renée de Bombelles
- Born: Jeanne-Renée de Bombelles; 3 May 1753
- Died: 4 May 1828 (aged 75)
- Genres: Folk song, Romance
- Occupations: Composer, Poet
- Instruments: Piano, Harp
- Spouse: Marquis de Travanet (married 1779, divorced)

Jeanne-Renée de Bombelles, Marquise de Travanet (3 May 1753 – 4 May 1828) was a French composer and poet who is best remembered today for the French folk song Pauvre Jacques.

== Early life ==
Travanet's parents were Henri Francois de Bombelles, the Comte de Bombelles, and Genevieve Charlotte de Badains. She had two half siblings from her father's earlier marriage (Marie and Joseph), and three full siblings (Marc, Alexandre, and Henriette).

== Biography ==
She was a lady-in-waiting to Louis XVI's sister Elizabeth before marrying the Marquis de Travanet in November 1779. They later divorced.

Travanet composed the music for Pauvre Jacques. Some sources indicate that she also wrote the words. Other sources attribute the words to a member of the royal family, possibly Marie Antoinette, or Louis XVI's sister Elizabeth.

== Pauvre Jacques lyrics ==
Pauvre Jacques, quand j'étais près de toi,
Je ne sentais pas ma misère;
Mais à présent que tu vis loin de moi,
Je manque de tout sur la terre. (bis)

Quand tu venais partager mes travaux,
Je trouvais ma tâche légère,
T'en souvient-il ? tous les jours étaient beaux.
Qui me rendra ce temps prospère? (bis)

Quand le soleil brille sur nos guérets,
Je ne puis souffrir sa lumière :
Et quand je suis à l'ombre des forêts.
J'accuse la nature entière. (bis)

Pauvre Jacques, quand j'étais près de toi,
Je ne sentais pas ma misère;
Mais à présent que tu vis loin de moi,
Je manque de tout sur la terre. (bis)

Poor Jacques, when I was near you,
I did not feel my misery;
But now that you live far from me,
I lack of everything on earth. (bis)

When you came to share my work,
I found my task light,
Do you remember it? every day was beautiful.
Who will give me back this prosperous time? (bis)

When the sun shines on our fallows,
I cannot endure its light:
And when I am in the shade of forests.
I blame the whole of nature. (bis)

Poor Jacques, when I was near you,
I did not feel my misery;
But now that you live far from me,
I lack of everything on earth. (bis)

— Jeanne-Renée de Bombelles, Marquise de Travenet, Pauvre Jacques

Travanet composed two volumes of Romances et Chansons, avec accompaniment de pianoforte ou le harpe. Individual songs by Travanet are included in many collections.

== See also ==
- Pauvre Jacques at French Wikipedia
- Download sheet music by Jean Renee de Bombelles
- Listen to “Pauvre Jacques” by Jeanne Renee de Bombelles
