= Marc Marie, Marquis de Bombelles =

French aristocrat and diplomat (1744–1822)

Marc Marie de Bombelles
- Bishop of Amiens
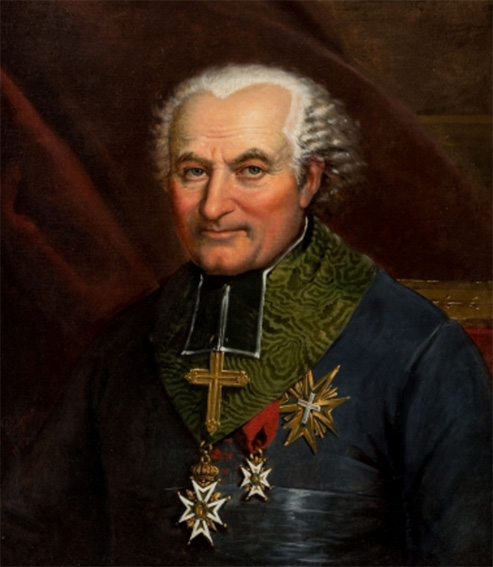
- Church: Catholic Church
- Diocese: Diocese of Amiens
- In office: 1 October 1817 – 5 March 1822
- Predecessor: Jean-François de Demandolx
- Successor: Jean-Pierre de Gallien de Chabons

Orders
- Ordination: 14 August 1803
- Consecration: 3 October 1819 by Jean-Charles de Coucy

Personal details
- Born: 8 October 1744 Bitche, Duchy of Lorraine, Upper Rhenish Circle, Holy Roman Empire
- Died: 5 March 1822 (aged 77) Paris, Kingdom of France

Marc Marie, Marquis de Bombelles (8 October 1744 – 5 March 1822) was a French diplomat and ecclesiastic. He was a son of Henri François de Bombelles, tutor and guardian of the duke of Orleans.

== Biography ==
He was born at Bitsch in Lorraine, and served in the army through the Seven Years' War. In 1765 he entered the diplomatic service, and after several diplomatic missions became ambassador of France to Portugal in 1786, being charged to win over that country to the Family Compact, but the madness of the queen and then the death of the king prevented his success.

In 1778, he married Angelique Charlotte de Mackau known as Marie-Angélique de Bombelles (1762–1800), the confidante of Madame Élisabeth of France. The couple had several children, including the diplomat Louis Philippe de Bombelles, and count Charles-René de Bombelles the second husband of Marie Louise, widow of Napoleon.

He was transferred to Vienna early in 1789, but the French Revolution cut short his diplomatic career, and he was deprived of his post in September 1790. He remained attached to Louis XVI, and was employed on secret missions to other sovereigns, to gain their aid for Louis. In 1792 he emigrated, and after the Battle of Valmy lived in retirement in Switzerland at Wartegg Castle in Rorschacherberg.

Afterward, he moved to Brno in the Habsburg Monarchy. At first he was followed by Austrian police, who feared the spread of French revolutionary ideas. Over time, however, he earned their trust and was allowed to settle at Château Nenovice (now part of Brno‑Ivanovice), where he supported several French émigrés. His diaries from his years in Brno provide valuable insights into city life around 1800. In 1804, after the death of his wife, he withdrew to the monastery of Brünn and the Rajhrad Abbey, and became a priest, vicar of Oberglogau near Neustadt, Prussian Silesia. In 1815 he returned to France, and became bishop of Amiens (1819). He died in Paris.

His son was the diplomat Louis Philippe de Bombelles.
