= Marie Angélique de Mackau =

French court office holder (1723–1801)

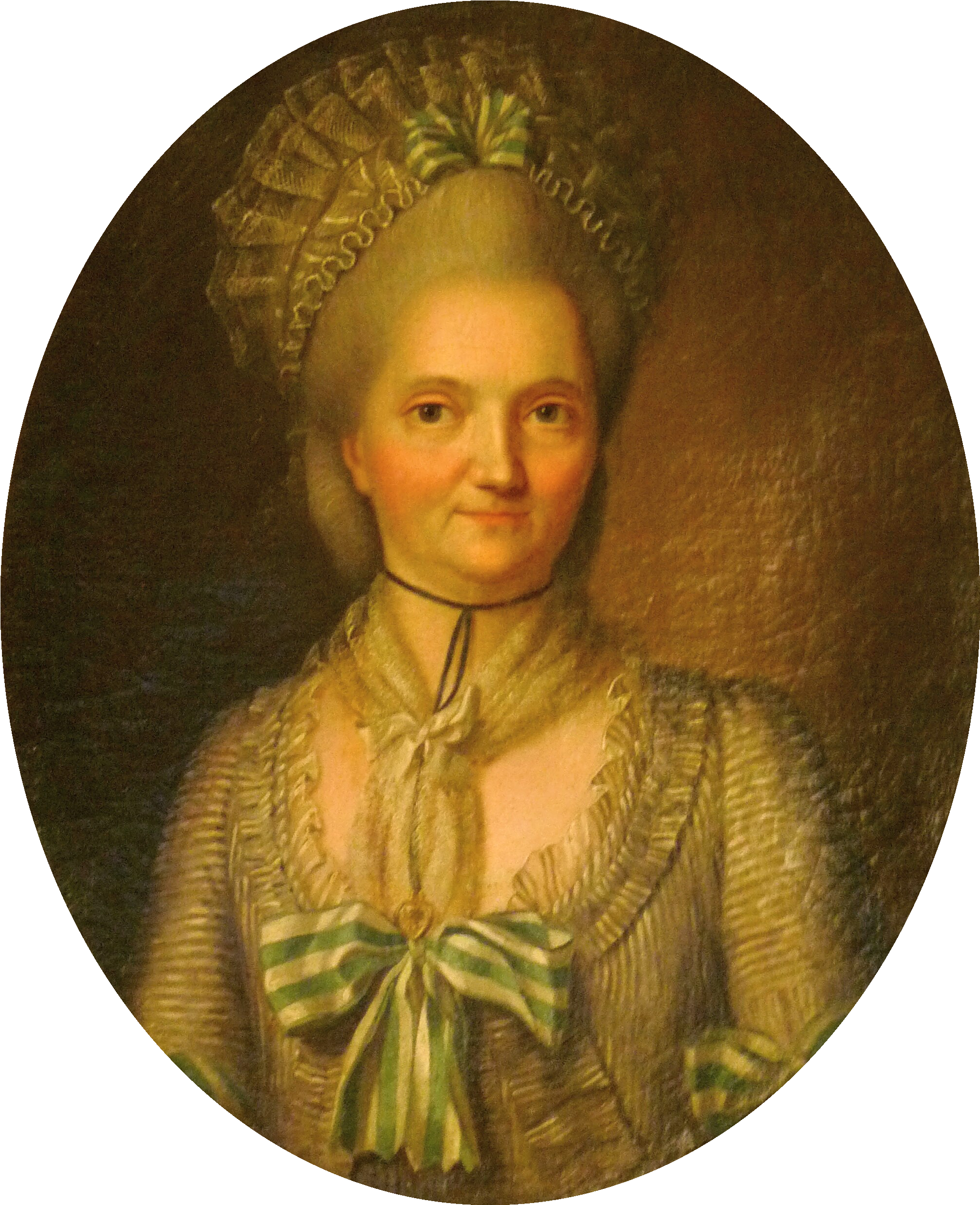
Marie-Angélique de Mackau by Charles-Alexis Huin (1778)

Marie Angélique de Mackau née de Fitte de Soucy (1723-1801), was a French court office holder. She was royal governess to Élisabeth of France (1764–1794) and later to the children of Louis XVI and Marie Antoinette from 1771 and 1792.

== Life ==
She was the daughter of Jean François de Fitte de Soucy (1686-1759). She married baron Louis Eléonor Dirkheim de Mackau (1727-1767) in 1755, and became the mother of Renée Suzanne de Soucy (1758-1841), Armand Louis de Mackau (1759-1827) and Marie-Angélique de Bombelles (1762-1800).

=== Sous Gouvernante ===
In 1771, she was appointed one of five sous gouvernante (deputy governess) to the royal children: they were placed under the Governess of the Children of France, but normally did most of the daily work. She was recommended to the post by the Prince Louis de Rohan.

Marie Angélique de Mackau reportedly had great importance for the development of Élisabeth of France, and was evidently in possession of "the firmness which bends resistance, and the affectionate kindness which inspires attachment", and under whose tuition she made progress in her education, as well as developed a softer personality, with her strong will directed toward religious principles. She reportedly became a lifelong friend and maternal figure to Elisabeth. When Elisabeth was given her own house at Montreuil in 1781, she built a small house for Mackau there and gave it to her. Marie Angélique de Mackau continued to serve as governess during the reign of Louis XVI. She was well liked by the children of Louis XVI.

Her sister-in-law Elisabeth Louise Lenoir de Verneuil de Soucy (1729-1813), and her elder daughter Renée Suzanne de Soucy were both appointed to be her colleagues as sous gouvernante. Her younger daughter, Marie-Angélique de Bombelles, married to Marc Marie de Bombelles, became maid-of-honour to Elisabeth before her marriage, as well as her lifelong personal friend and correspondent.

=== Revolution ===
Mackau accompanied the royal family to the Tuileries Palace in Paris after the Women's March on Versailles during the French Revolution in October 1789.

During the Demonstration of 20 June 1792, she, alongside Princess de Lamballe, Madame de Tourzel, the Duchess de Maillé, Mme de Laroche-Aymon, Louise-Emmanuelle de Châtillon, Princesse de Tarente, Renée Suzanne de Soucy, Mme de Ginestous, and a few noblemen, belonged to the courtiers surrounding the queen and her children for several hours when the mob passed by the room shouting insults to Marie Antoinette.

During the 10 August (French Revolution), she and the other ladies-in-waiting of the queen were left in the Queen’s chamber after the royal family left the palace in the company of Princess de Lamballe and Madame de Tourzel. When the mob broke in to the chamber, Louise-Emmanuelle de Châtillon, Princesse de Tarente pleaded with the leading Marseillais, who stated: "We do not fight with women; go, all of you, if you choose," after which the women were all allowed to depart the palace unharmed, some of them even escorted by the rioters.

Marie Angélique de Mackau was arrested and placed in the La Force. During the September Massacres, she, as well as Louise-Élisabeth de Croÿ de Tourzel and three other women formerly in court employ - Mme de Navarre, Mme Thibaud, and Mme Basire - were freed by the tribunal and released on 3 September.

When Marie Thérèse of France was released from the Temple in 1795 and allowed to depart for Austria, she requested that Mackau accompany her. Because of her advanced age, such a long journey was not considered good for her health, and Mackau was forced to decline; her daughter Renée Suzanne de Soucy took her place.
