= Renée Suzanne de Soucy =

French court office holder (1758–1841)

Renée Suzanne de Soucy née de Mackau (21 April 1758 – 1 April 1841), was a French court office holder. She was royal governess to the children of Louis XVI and Marie Antoinette from 1781 and 1792.

== Life ==
She was the daughter of baron Marie Henri Louis Eleonor Dirkheim de Mackau and Marie Angélique de Mackau, and the sister of Marie-Angélique de Bombelles (1762-1800) and Armand Louis de Mackau (1759-1827). She married her first cousin, Count François-Louis de Fitte de Soucy on 11 April 1774, aged only fifteen. They had six children together, among them Louis Xavier de Fitte de Soucy.

In 1781, she was appointed one of five sous gouvernante (depute governess) to the royal children: they were placed under the Governess of the Children of France, but normally did most of the daily work. Her mother and her mother-in-law Elisabeth Louise Lenoir de Verneuil de Soucy (1729-1813) were two of the other four sous gouvernante. In contrast to her mother, who was loved by her pupils and respected at court, de Soucy was not as liked by her students, and was described as authoritarian and an intriguer.

=== Revolution ===
Soucy accompanied the royal family to the Tuileries Palace in Paris after the Women's March on Versailles during the French Revolution in October 1789. During the Demonstration of 20 June 1792, she, alongside Princess de Lamballe, Madame de Tourzel, the Duchess de Maillé, Mme de Laroche-Aymon, Louise-Emmanuelle de Châtillon, Princesse de Tarente, Marie Angélique de Mackau, Mme de Ginestous, and a few noblemen, belonged to the courtiers surrounding the queen and her children for several hours when the mob passed by the room shouting insults to Marie Antoinette.

During the 10 August (French Revolution), she was left in the queen's chamber, along with the rest of the queen’s ladies-in-waiting, after the royal family left the palace only in the company of Princess de Lamballe and Madame de Tourzel. When the mob broke in to the chamber, Louise-Emmanuelle de Châtillon, Princesse de Tarente made a personal appeal to the leading Marseillais, who stated: "We do not fight with women; go, all of you, if you choose," after which the women were all allowed to depart the palace unharmed, some of them even escorted by the rioters.

On request of the queen, she brought the royal adoptive daughter Ernestine de Lambriquet to safety from the Tuileries Palace. Passing the Carousel square in front to the palace, de Soucy left Lambriquet to fetch a coach. When she was away, a rebel mistook Lambriquet for Marie Thérèse and threw the corpse of a member of the Swiss Guard in front of her feet, but a shop-keeper defended her, also believing she was Marie Thérèse. They both hid with the Mackau family during the Terror.

=== Trip of 1795 ===
When Marie Thérèse of France was released from Temple in 1795 and allowed to depart for Austria, she was chosen to accompany her on her journey to the border in Huningue after her mother - who had been the first choice of Marie Thérèse - was forced to decline for health reasons. Marie Thérèse, who traveled under the name Sophie, sat in the carriage with de Soucy and the guards Mechin (posing as the father of Sophie) and Gomin; the male servants Hue and Baron, the cook Meunier, as well as the maid Catherine de Varenne and a teenage boy called Pierre de Soucy followed them in the next carriage.

After their arrival in Austria, the French entourage of Marie Thérèse were fired by the Austrian emperor, who did not wish them to convince Marie Thérèse not to submit to his will to marry an Austrian archduke, but before her departure, de Soucy stated that Louis XVI and Marie Antoinette wished for their daughter to marry the duke of Angoulême.

=== Switch theory ===
According to the legendary switch theory of the Dunkelgrafen, de Soucy assisted Marie Thérèse in changing place with Ernestine de Lambriquet during the trip to Austria in 1795-96. Among the eight people accompanying Marie Thérèse during her trip through France in 1795; the maid Catherine de Varenne and the teenage boy Pierre de Soucy is mentioned in the passports, but are otherwise impossible to identify. Pierre de Soucy is stated in the passport to be the son of Renée Suzanne de Soucy, but she had no son by that name. According to the switch theory, Pierre de Soucy (or possibly Catherine de Varenne) was in fact Ernestine de Lambriquet, who switched place with Marie Thérèse during the journey with the assistance of Renée Suzanne de Soucy, after which Ernestine de Lambriquet continued to Austria posing as Marie Thérèse, while Marie Thérèse herself settled in Germany as the Dunkelgrafen.

The Austrian emperor had in fact requested that Ernestine de Lambriquet should be allowed to accompany Marie Thérèse to Austria, but Minister Benezch had given the reply that Ernestine de Lambriquet could not be located. In reality, however, there would not have been any trouble to locate Ernestine de Lambriquet, as she had lived under the protection of Renée Suzanne de Soucy and the Mackau family since the storming of the Tuileries.

The alternative suggestion is that "Pierre de Soucy" was in fact one of the daughters of Renée Suzanne de Soucy, dressed as a boy in order to make the travel group less identifiable, as Marie Thérèse was estimated to have been exposed to threats not only from anti-royalists, but also from agents sent by foreign powers to kidnap her during her journey to the border.

It is known that Renée Suzanne de Soucy exposed Marie Thérèse to blackmail, which has been the subject of speculation. In 1823, she published a false autobiography by Marie Thérèse. From 1832, she performed a blackmail toward Marie Thérèse in collaboration with a doctor Lavergne. She claimed to have a manuscript consisting of the memoirs of Marie Thérèse but was willing not to publish for economic compensation. Marie Thérèse did pay her 24.000 franc in 1837. The following year, de Soucy stated that the sum was given to her in exchange for a diary from the 1795 trip. After the death of de Soucy, Lavergne continued the blackmail until 1847. Speculations has taken this long and successful blackmail as a support for the switch theory.

== Sources ==
- Nagel, Susan. " Marie-Therese, Child of Terror: The Fate of Marie Antoinette's Daughter ". NY: Bloomsbury, 2008. ISBN 1-59691-057-7
