= Louis Philippe de Bombelles =

Austrian count and diplomat (1780–1843)

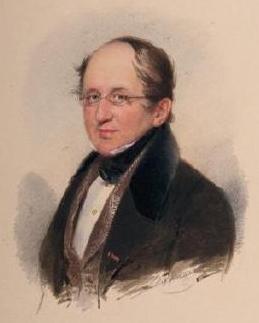
Louis Philippe de Bombelles by Moritz Daffinger (1837)

Louis Philippe de Bombelles (German: Ludwig Philipp, Graf von Bombelles; 1 July 1780 – 7 July 1843) was an Austrian count and diplomat.

== Early life ==
Born in 1780 in Regensburg, he was a member of the noble Bombelles family. He was the son of the French nobleman Marc Marie, Marquis de Bombelles and Baroness Marie Angélique de Mackau.

== Biography ==
He was brought up in Naples and was briefly an officer here. He served as attaché for Klemens von Metternich in Berlin (1804), chargé d'affaires in Berlin (1813), and ambassador in Copenhagen (1814-16), where he married the performer, Ida Brun. He was transferred to Dresden, where his house was a center for the city's musical life. In 1819, he participated in the Karlsbad Congress. Later, he was ambassador at several Italian courts and eventually (in 1837) in Bern. He died in 1843 in Vienna.
