= Élisabeth of France =

French princess, Sister of Louis XVI, Martyr and Servant of God (1764–1794)

- Princesse de France
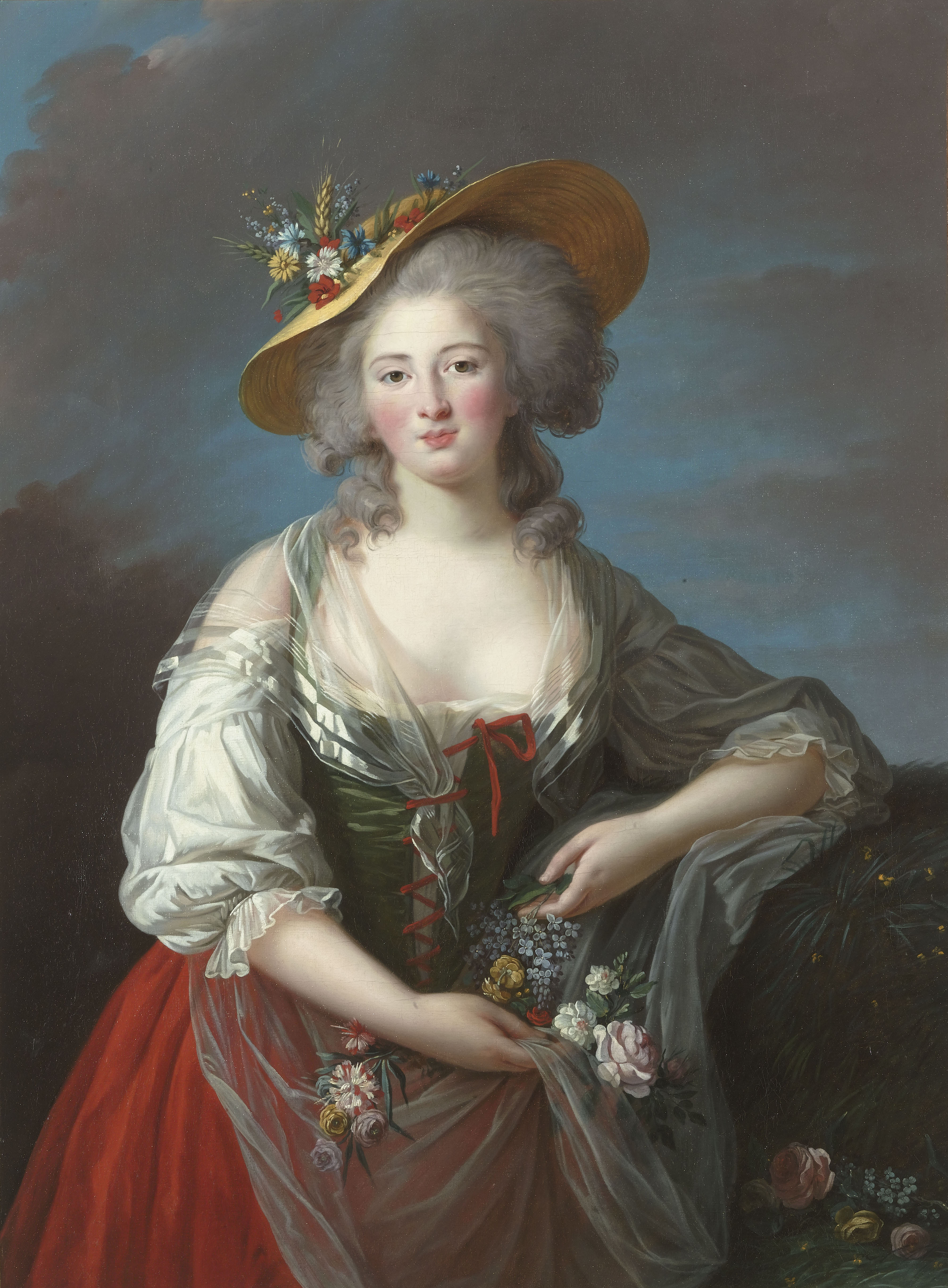
- Elisabeth-Philippe-Marie-Hélène de France, dite Madame Elisabeth, portrait by Élisabeth Vigée Le Brun, c. 1782
- Born: 3 May 1764; Château de Versailles, Versailles, Kingdom of France
- Died: 10 May 1794 (aged 30); Place de la Révolution, Paris, French First Republic
- Burial: Cimetière des Errancis, Paris, France (first); Catacombs of Paris, Paris, France (final)
Names
- Élisabeth Philippine Marie Hélène
- Father: Louis, Dauphin of France
- Mother: Duchess Maria Josepha of Saxony
- Coat of arms

Élisabeth of France (Élisabeth Philippine Marie Hélène; 3 May 1764 – 10 May 1794), also known as Madame Élisabeth, was a French princess. She was the youngest child of Louis, Dauphin of France, and Duchess Maria Josepha of Saxony, and she was a sister of King Louis XVI. Élisabeth's father, the Dauphin, was the son and heir of King Louis XV and his popular wife, Queen Marie Leszczyńska. Élisabeth remained beside her brother and his family during the French Revolution, and she was executed during the Reign of Terror at the Place de la Révolution. The cause for her beatification and canonization has been introduced by the Catholic Church, and she was declared a Servant of God by Pope Pius XII.

== Early life ==
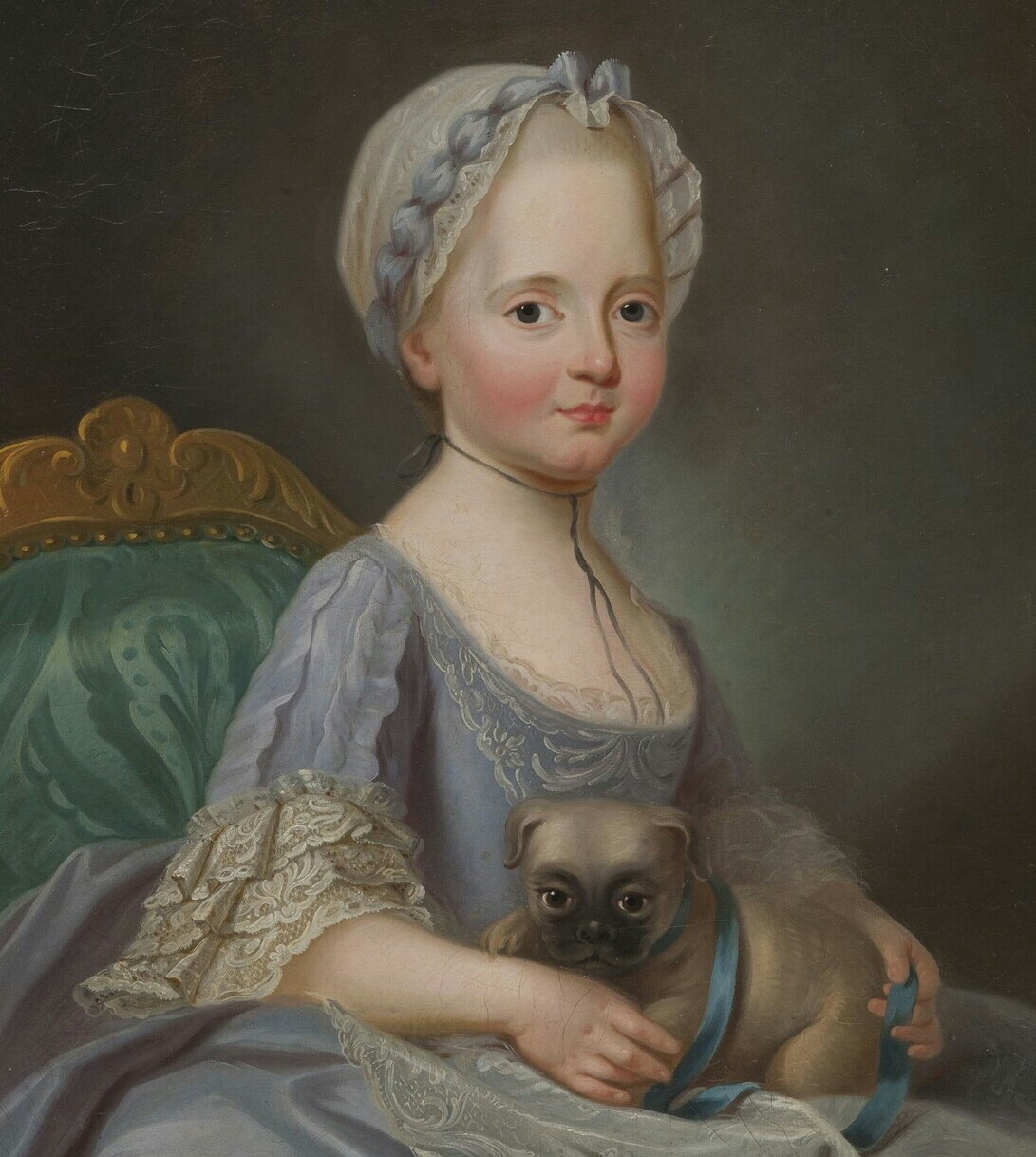
Élisabeth as a child (portrait by Joseph Ducreux, 1768)

Élisabeth Philippe Marie Hélène was born on 3 May 1764 in the Palace of Versailles. She was the youngest child of Louis, Dauphin of France, and Marie-Josèphe of Saxony. Her paternal grandparents were King Louis XV and Queen Marie Leszczyńska. As the daughter of the Dauphin, she was a fille de France.

At the sudden death of her father in 1765, Élisabeth's oldest surviving brother, Louis-Auguste (later to be Louis XVI) became the new Dauphin (the heir apparent to the French throne). Their mother Marie Josèphe died in March 1767 from tuberculosis. This left Élisabeth an orphan at just two years old, along with her older siblings: Louis-Auguste, Louis Stanislas, Count of Provence, Charles Philippe, Count of Artois, and Marie Clotilde of France.

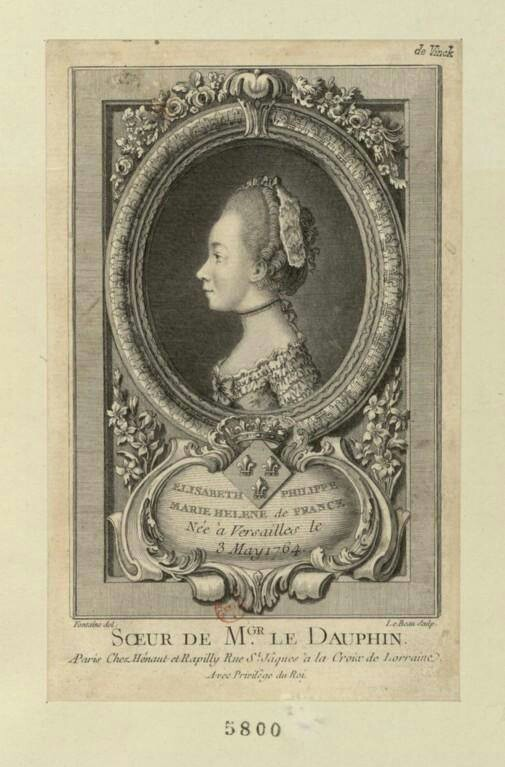
Élisabeth Philippe Marie Helene de France (engraving by Pierre François Léonard Fontaine, c. 1775)

Élisabeth and her elder sister, Clotilde of France, were raised by Madame de Marsan, Governess to the Children of France. The sisters were considered very dissimilar in personality. While Èlisabeth was described as "proud, inflexible, and passionate", Clotilde was in contrast estimated to be "endowed with the most happy disposition, which only needed guiding and developing". They were given the usual education of contemporary royal princesses, focusing upon accomplishments, religion and virtue, an education to which Clotilde reportedly willingly subjected herself. They were tutored in botany by M. Lemonnier, in history and geography by M. Leblond, and in religion by Abbé de Montigat, Canon of Chartres, and they followed the court among the royal palaces, with their days divided between studies, walks in the Park, and drives in the forest. Madame de Marsan would often take her to visit the students at St. Cyr, where select young ladies were presented to be introduced to the princess.

While Clotilde was described as a docile pupil "who made herself loved by all who approached her", Élisabeth long refused to study, saying that "there were always people at hand whose duty it was to think for princes", and treated her staff with impatience. Madame de Marsan, who was unable to handle Élisabeth, preferred Clotilde, which made Élisabeth jealous and created a rift between the two sisters. Their relationship improved when Élisabeth fell ill and Clotilde insisted upon nursing her, during which time she also taught Élisabeth the alphabet and gave her an interest in religion, which prompted a great change in the girl's personality; Clotilde soon came to be her sister's friend, tutor, and councillor. After this, Élisabeth was given Marie Angélique de Mackau as her tutor, who reportedly had "the firmness which bends resistance, and the affectionate kindness which inspires attachment", and under whose tuition Èlisabeth made progress in her education, as well as developing a softer personality, with her strong will directed toward religious principles.

In 1770, her eldest brother, the Dauphin, married Archduchess Maria Antonia of Austria, better known as Marie Antoinette. Marie Antoinette found Élisabeth delightful, and reportedly demonstrated too openly that she preferred her to her sister Clotilde, which caused some offence at court.

== Louis XVI ==
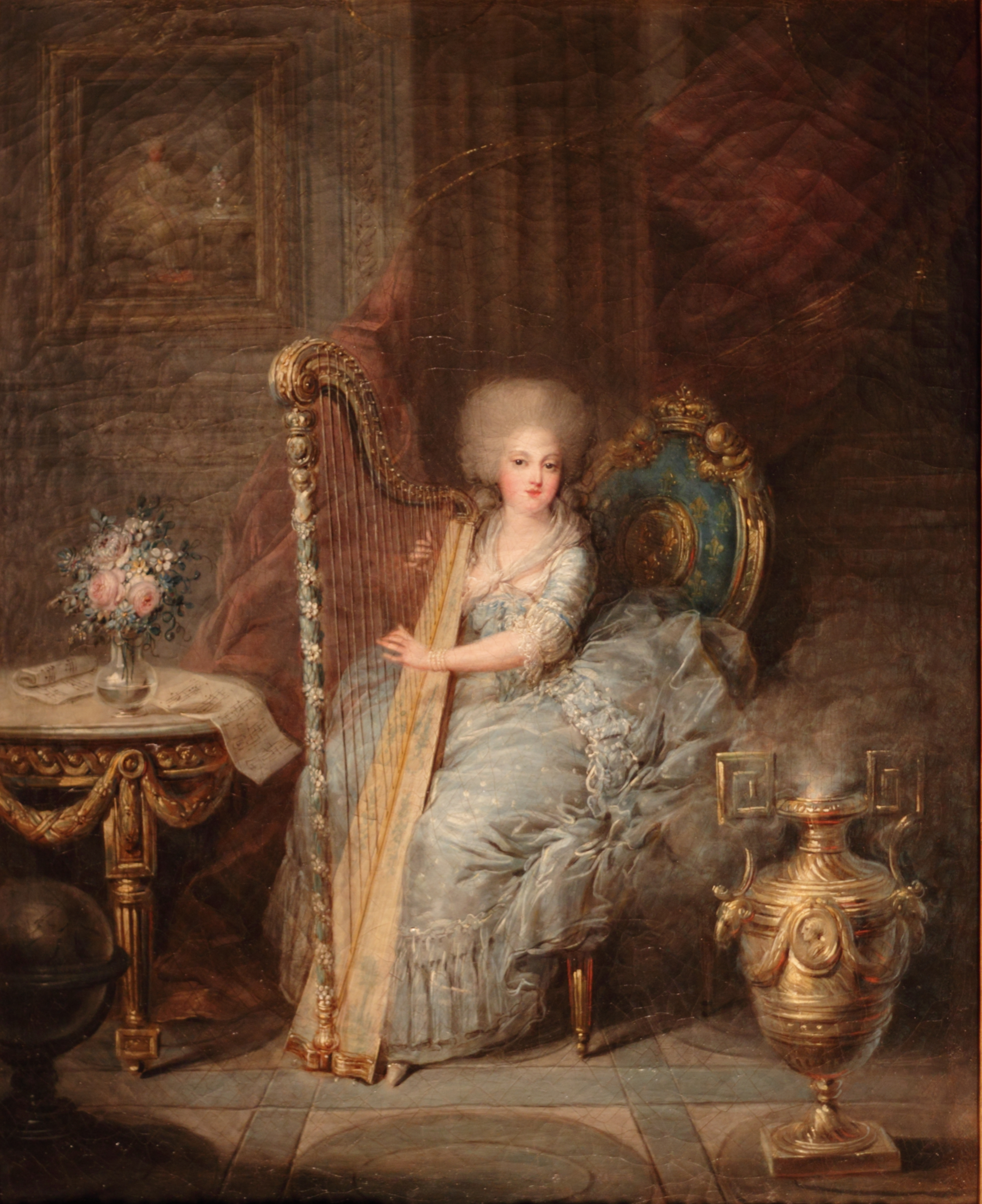
Madame Élisabeth with harp

On 10 May 1774, her grandfather, King Louis XV, died, and her elder brother Louis-Auguste ascended the throne as Louis XVI.

In August 1775, her sister Clotilde left France for her marriage to the Crown Prince of Sardinia. The farewell between the sisters was described as intense, with Élisabeth hardly able to tear herself from Clotilde’s arms. Queen Marie Antoinette commented:

"My sister Elisabeth is a charming child, who has intelligence, character, and much grace; she showed the greatest feeling, and much above her age, at the departure of her sister. The poor little girl was in despair, and as her health is very delicate, she was taken ill and had a very severe nervous attack. I own to my dear mamma that I fear I am getting too attached to her, feeling, from the example of my aunts, how essential it is for her happiness not to remain an old maid in this country."
"She shows on the occasion of her sister's departure and in several other circumstances a charming good sense and sensibility. When one has such right feeling at eleven years of age, it is very delightful. . . . The poor little dear will leave us perhaps in two years' time. I am sorry she should go as far as Portugal, but it will be happier for her to go so young as she will feel the difference between the two countries less. May God grant that her sensibility does not render her unhappy."

=== Adult life ===
On 17 May 1778, after the visit of the court to Marly, Madame Élisabeth formally left the children's chamber and became an adult when she, upon the wish of the King her brother, was turned over to the King by her governess and given her own household, with Diane de Polignac as maid of honour and Bonne Marie Félicité de Sérent as lady-in-waiting. The ceremony was described: "Mme Élisabeth accompanied by the Princesse de Guéménée, the under governesses, and the ladies in attendance, went to the King's apartments, and there Mme de Guéménée formally handed over her charge to His Majesty, who sent for Mme la Comtesse Diane de Polignac, maid of honour to the Princess and Mme la Marquise de Sereat, her lady-in-waiting, into whose care he gave Mme Élisabeth."

Several attempts were made to arrange a marriage for her. The first suggested partner was Jose, Prince of Brazil. She made no objections to the match but was reportedly relieved when the negotiations were discontinued.

Next, she was offered a proposal by the Duke of Aosta (future Victor Emmanuel I of Sardinia), brother of the Crown Prince of Savoy and brother-in-law of her sister Clotilde. The court of France, however, did not consider it proper for a French princess to be married to a prince of lower status than that of a monarch or an heir to a throne, and the marriage was refused on her behalf.

Finally, a marriage was suggested between her and her sister-in-law's brother Joseph II, Holy Roman Emperor, who had a good impression of her from his visit to France the previous year, and commented that he was attracted by the "vivacity of her intellect and her amiable character." However, the anti-Austrian party at court viewed an alliance between France and Austria as contrary to the interests of France, and by 1783 the plans were finally discontinued and no further suggestions of marriage were made. Élisabeth herself was content not to marry, as it would have been to a foreign prince, which would force her to leave France: "I can only marry a king's son, and a king's son must reign over his father's kingdom. I should no longer be a Frenchwoman. I do not wish to cease to be one. It is far better to stay here at the foot of my brother's throne than to ascend another."

Madame Élisabeth did not play any royal role prior to the Revolution; she viewed the royal court as decadent and a threat to her moral welfare, and acted to distance herself from it, and she attended court only when her presence was absolutely necessary or when she was explicitly asked by the King or Queen. When she left the royal children's chamber and formed her own household as an adult, she reportedly resolved to protect herself from the potential moral threats from court life by continuing to follow the principles set by her governesses and tutors during her childhood: to devote her days to a schedule of religious devotion, study, riding and walks, and to socialize only with "the ladies who have educated me and who are attached to me [...] my good aunts, the Ladies of St. Cyr, the Carmelites of St. Denis".

She often visited her aunt, Louise of France, at the Carmelite convent of St. Denis. The king, who was somewhat worried that she would become a nun, once said "I ask nothing better than that you should go to see your aunt, on condition that you do not follow her example: Élisabeth, I need you." A staunch believer in absolute monarchy, Élisabeth had great respect for the position of her eldest brother the King, and regarded it her duty to stand by him. On a personal level, she was deeply devoted to her second brother, the Count of Provence: "My brother the Comte de Provence, is at the same time the best adviser and the most charming conteur. He is seldom mistaken in his judgment of men and things, and his prodigious memory furnishes him in all circumstances with a never-ending flow of interesting anecdote." Her youngest brother, the Count of Artois, was dissimilar to her and was sometimes given an "affectionate lecture" by her for his scandals, though he came to admire her.

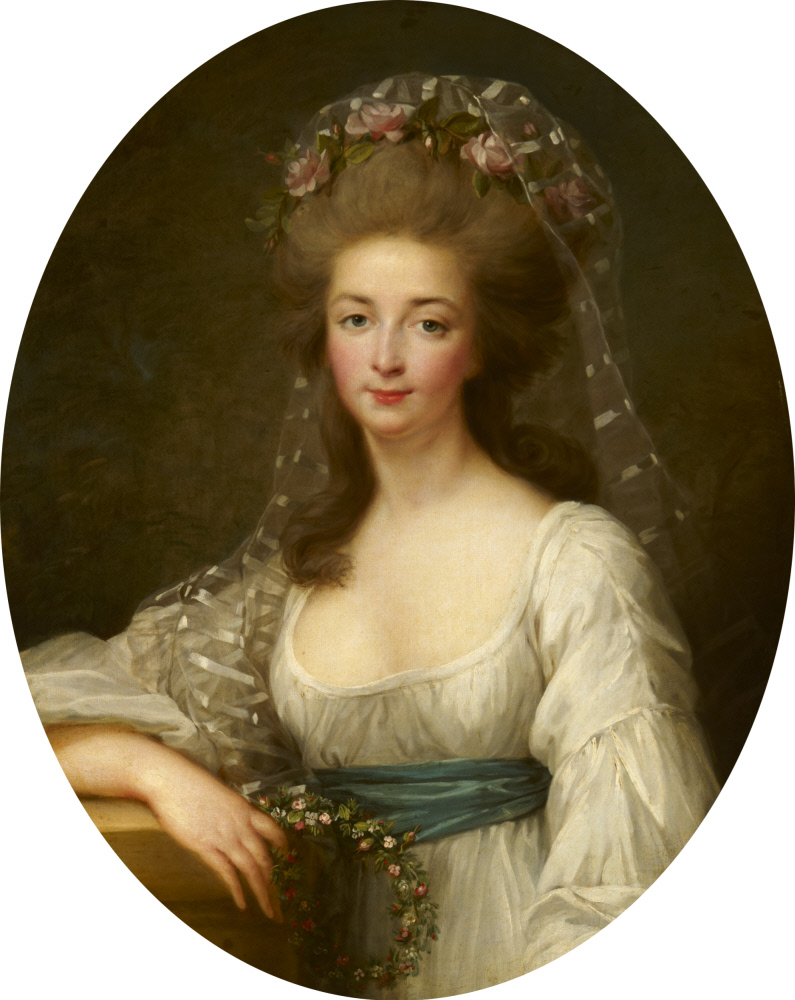
Madame Élisabeth, painted in the manner of Élisabeth Vigée Le Brun

Her relationship with Queen Marie Antoinette was complicated, as they were quite dissimilar. Marie Antoinette reportedly found Élisabeth delightful when she first entered court as an adult: "The Queen is enchanted with her. She tells everyone that there is no one more amiable, that she did not know her well before, but that now she has made her her friend and that it will be for life." Élisabeth, however, was close to her aunts, the Mesdames de France, who were members of the anti-Austrian party at court, noted for their animosity toward the Queen and deeply opposed to her informal reforms in court life, and the latter view was shared by Élisabeth who, as a monarchist, regarded the queen's disregard of etiquette as a threat to the monarchy, and once remarked in connection to it: "if sovereigns descended often to the people, the people would approach near enough to see that the Queen was only a pretty woman, and that they would soon conclude that the King was merely the first among officials." She also attempted to criticize the Queen's behaviour in this regard but never did so openly, instead asking her aunt Madame Adélaïde to do it for her. Regardless of these differences, she did occasionally visit Marie Antoinette in the Petit Trianon where they fished in the artificial lake, watched the cows being milked and welcomed the King and his brothers for supper "in white cotton dresses, straw hats and gauze fichus", and she did, at least on one occasion, agree to participate in one of the Queen's amateur theatre performances. She became devoted to the children of the King and Queen, in particular the first dauphin and Marie Thérèse of France. Élisabeth became the godmother of Sophie Hélène Beatrix of France in 1786, and the same year she participated in the centenary of St. Cyr, a school in which she took a great interest.

=== Montreuil ===
In 1781, the King gave her Montreuil not far from Versailles as a private retreat, and the Queen presented it to her with the words: "My sister, you are now at home. This place will be your Trianon." The King did not allow her to spend her nights at Montreuil until she was twenty-four, but she normally spent her entire days there from morning Mass until she returned to Versailles to sleep. At Montreuil, she followed a schedule that divided her days into hours for study, exercise by riding or walking, dinner and prayers with her ladies-in-waiting, inspired by the schedule set by her governesses during her childhood. Élisabeth took an interest in gardening and engaged in charity in the nearby village of Montreuil. Her former tutor Lemonnier was her neighbour at Montreuil, and she named him her almoner to distribute her charity in the village: "There grew up a constant interchange of interests between them. The learned Professor shared his botanical studies in his garden with the Princess, and even his experiments in his laboratory; and Mme Élisabeth in return associated her old friend with her in her charities, and made him her almoner in the village." She imported cows from Switzerland and the Swiss Jacques Bosson to manage them; upon his request, she also brought his parents and his cousin-bride Marie to Montreuil, married Marie to him and installed her as her milkmaid, and arranged for the Bosson family to tend her farm at Montreuil, producing the milk and eggs which she distributed to the poor children of the village. This was regarded by the court as a picturesque idyll, and it was Jacques Bosson who was portrayed by Mme de Travannes in the poem "Pauvre Jacques", which became very popular and was set to music by the composer Jeanne Renee de Bombelles.

Élisabeth was interested in politics and was a staunch supporter of absolute monarchy. She attended the opening of the Assembly of Notables at Versailles on 22 February 1787 and commented:

What will this famous Assembly do for us? Nothing, except to let the people know the critical position in which we are. The King acts in good faith in asking their advice; will they do the same in the counsels they will give him? The Queen is very pensive. Sometimes we spend hours alone without her saying a word. She seems to fear me. And yet who can take a more lively interest than I do in my brother's happiness? Our views differ. She is an Austrian. I am a Bourbon. The Comte d'Artois does not understand the necessity of these great reforms; he thinks that people augment the deficit in order to have the right to complain and to demand the assembly of the States-General. Monsieur is much occupied in writing; he is much more serious, and you know he was grave enough already. I have a presentiment that all this will turn out badly. As for me, intrigues tire me. I love peace and rest. But I will never leave the King while he is unhappy.

== Revolution ==
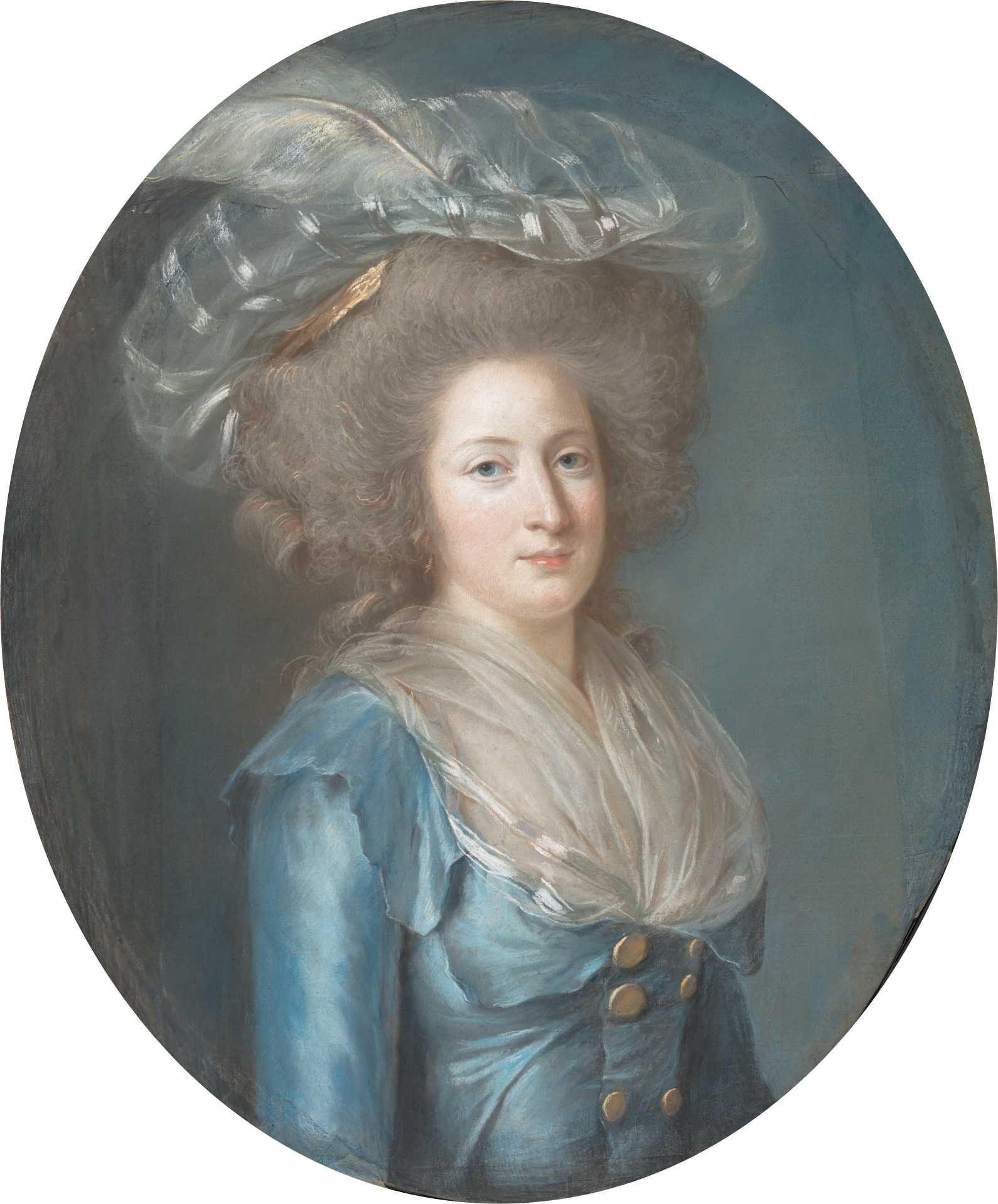
Élisabeth de France in 1787 (portrait by Adélaïde Labille-Guiard)

Élisabeth and her brother Charles-Philippe, Comte d'Artois, were the staunchest conservatives in the royal family. Unlike Artois, who, on the order of the king, left France on 17 July 1789, three days after the storming of the Bastille, Élisabeth refused to emigrate when the gravity of the events set in motion by the French Revolution became clear.

On 5 October 1789, Élisabeth saw the Women's March on Versailles from Montreuil and immediately returned to the Palace of Versailles. She advised the king to carry out "a vigorous and speedy repression of the riot" rather than to negotiate, and that the royal family should relocate to some town further from Paris, so as to be free from any influence of factions. Her advice was countered by Jacques Necker, and she retired to the Queen's apartments. She was not disturbed when the mob stormed the palace to assassinate the queen, but awoke and called to the King, who was worried about her. When the mob demanded that the King return with them to Paris, and Lafayette advised him to consent, Élisabeth unsuccessfully advised the King differently:

Sire, it is not to Paris you should go. You still have devoted battalions, faithful guards, who will protect your retreat, but I implore you, my brother, do not go to Paris.

Élisabeth accompanied the royal family to Paris, where she chose to live with them in the Tuileries Palace rather than with her aunts mesdames Adélaïde and Victoire, in the Château de Bellevue. The day after their arrival, Madame de Tourzel stated that the royal family was woken by large crowds outside, and that every member of the family, "even the Princesses", was obliged to show themselves to the public wearing the national cockade.

In the Tuileries, Élisabeth was housed in the Pavillon de Flore. Initially, on the first floor beside the queen, she swapped with the Princesse de Lamballe to the second floor in the Pavillon de Flore after some fish market women had climbed into her apartment through the windows.

In contrast to the queen, Madame Élisabeth had a good reputation among the public, and was referred to as the "Sainte Genevieve of the Tuileries" by the market women of Les Halles. The court life at the Tuileries was described as subdued. Élisabeth attended dinner with the royal family, worked on a tapestry with the queen after dinner, participated in the evening family supper with the count and countess of Provence every day, and continued to manage her property in Montreuil by letter. She also maintained a significant correspondence with friends both inside and outside France, particularly her exiled brothers and her friend Marie-Angélique de Bombelles, which is preserved and describes her political views.

In February 1791, she chose not to emigrate with her aunts Adélaïde and Victoire. She commented in a letter:

I thought I could see in your letters and in others I have received that people are surprised that I have not done as my aunts have done. I did not think that my duty called me to take this step, and that is what has dictated my decision. But believe that I shall never be capable of betraying my duty nor my religion, nor my affection for those who alone merit it, and with whom I would give the world to live.

=== Flight to Varennes ===
In June 1791, she accompanied the royal family on its unsuccessful escape attempt, which was stopped at Varennes, where they were forced to return to Paris. During the journey, Mme de Tourzel passed as a Baroness de Korff, the king as her valet-de-chambre, the queen as her maid, and Élisabeth as the children's nurse.

She took no leading part in the famous flight but did play a role on their way back to Paris. Soon after leaving Epernay on their return, the party was joined by three emissaries of the Assembly: Antoine Barnave, Jérôme Pétion de Villeneuve, and Charles César de Fay de La Tour-Maubourg, and the two first joined them inside the carriage. During the journey, Élisabeth spoke to Barnave for several hours in an attempt to justify the attempted escape of the King and describe his views of the revolution, which was in part described in the memoirs of Tourzel:

"I am very glad that you have given me the chance of opening my heart and of speaking to you frankly about the Revolution. You are too clever, M. Barnave, not to have recognised at once the King's love for the French and his desire to make them happy. Misled by an excessive love for liberty, you thought only of its benefits, without considering the disorder which might accompany it. Dazzled by your first success, you went much further than you intended. The resistance you met with strengthened you against difficulties and made you crush without reflection all that was an obstacle to your plans. You forgot that progress must go slowly, and that in striving to arrive quickly, one runs the risk of losing one's way. You persuaded yourself that by destroying everything that already existed, good or bad, you would make a perfect work and that you would then re-establish what it was useful to preserve. Led away by this desire, you have attacked the very foundations of royalty, and covered with bitterness and insult the best of kings. All his efforts and sacrifices to bring you back to wiser ideas have been useless, and you have not ceased to calumniate his intentions and to humiliate him in the eyes of his people, in taking from royalty all the prerogatives which inspire love and respect. Torn from his palace and taken to Paris in the most disgraceful manner, his goodness never failed. He opened his arms to his misguided children, and tried to come to an understanding with them in order to cooperate with them for the welfare of France, which he cherished in spite of its errors. You have forced him to sign a Constitution not yet completed, although he represented to you that it would be better not to sanction an unfinished piece of work, and you have obliged him to present it in this form to the People before a Federation of which the object was to attach the Departments to you in isolating the King from the nation."
"Ah, Madame, do not complain of the Federation. We should have been lost, had you known how to profit by it," replied Barnave.
"The King, in spite of the fresh insults he has received since then, could not make up his mind to do what he has now done. But, attacked in his principles – in his family – in his person – profoundly afflicted by the crimes committed throughout France and seeing a general disorganization in all departments of Government, with the evils which result; determined to quit Paris in order to go to another town in the kingdom, where, free in his own actions, he could persuade the Assembly to revise its decrees and where he could in concert with it make a new Constitution, in which the different authorities could be classified and replaced in their proper place and could work for the happiness of France. I do not speak of our own sorrows. The King alone, who should make one with France, occupies us entirely. I will never leave him unless your decrees, by withholding all liberty to practice religion, force me to abandon him to go to a country where liberty of conscience enables me to practice my religion, to which I hold more than to my life."
"By no means, Madame, your example and your presence are too useful to your country," replied Barnave.

Pétion for his part famously described Élisabeth as attracted by him during the journey: Élisabeth herself later alluded to this in a letter by commenting that she remembered "certain strange remarks of his during the journey from Varennes." At the inn at Dormans, Élisabeth was reportedly contacted by Officer Jean Landrieux, who used her as an intermediary in his unsuccessful attempt to help the family escape through the window and via the river to Vincelles. Upon the return to Paris, Élisabeth and Tourzel were escorted from the carriage to the palace by Barnave and La Tour-Maubourg respectively and last, after the King, the Queen and the royal children; while the crowd had greeted the King with silence, the Queen with dislike, and the children with cheers, there was no particular public reaction to Élisabeth and Tourzel.

Élisabeth commented on the journey to Marie-Angélique de Bombelles:

"Our journey with Barnave and Pétion passed off very ludicrously. You believe no doubt that we were in torments! Not at all. They behaved very well, especially the former, who is very intelligent, and not fierce as is said. I began by showing them frankly my opinion of their doings, and after that we conversed for the rest of the journey as if we were not concerned in the matter. Barnave saved the Gardes de Corps who were with us, and whom the National Guard wished to massacre on our arrival here."

After their return, the King, the Queen, and the Dauphin (and also his governess Tourzel) were placed under surveillance. But no guards were tasked with the surveillance of the King's daughter or sister, and Élisabeth was in fact free to leave any time she wished. She chose to stay with her brother and sister-in-law, according to Tourzel, as "their consolation during their captivity. Her attentions to the King and Queen and their children always redoubled in proportion to their misfortunes." She was urged by one of her correspondents, the Abbé de Lubersac, to join her aunts in Rome, but refused: "There are certain positions in which one cannot dispose of oneself, and such is mine. The line I should follow is traced so clearly by Providence that I must remain faithful to it."

=== Events of 1792 ===
On 20 February 1792, Élisabeth accompanied the queen to the Comédie-Italienne, which was remembered as the last time the queen made such a visit and was applauded in public, she also attended the official celebrations after the King signed the new constitution, and the Federation celebration of 14 July 1792. The new constitution prompted her exiled brothers to prepare a French exile regency, and Elisabeth informed her brother the count of Artois of the political changes in code. She unsuccessfully opposed the King's sanction of the Decree against the priests who refused to take the oath mandated by the Civil Constitution of the Clergy.

Élisabeth, as well as Marie Antoinette, were also visited by the delegation of slave owners from Saint Domingue, who had come to petition the King for his protection against the slave rebellion, during which the image of her was alluded to: "in appearing before you, Madame, they can feel no other sentiment than that of veneration for your high virtues. The interest which you will deign to feel for their fate will sweeten its bitterness", upon which she replied: "Gentlemen, I have keenly felt the misfortunes which have visited the Colony. I very sincerely share the interest taken in it by the King and the Queen, and I beg you to assure all the Colonists of this."

During the Demonstration of 20 June 1792 at the Tuileries Palace, Élisabeth made a great impression with her courage, in particular when she was famously temporarily mistaken for the Queen. She was present in the chamber of the King during the event and remained by his side during most of the incident. When the demonstrators forced the King to put on the revolutionary red cap, Élisabeth was mistaken for the Queen. She was warned: "You do not understand, they take you for the Austrian", upon which she famously replied: "Ah, would to God it were so, do not enlighten them, save them from a greater crime." She turned aside a bayonet which was pointed against her with the words: "Take care, monsieur. You might wound someone, and I am sure you would be sorry." When a male royalist attempting to protect the King fainted, she reached him and revived him with her smelling salt. After the Demonstration of 20 June, some of the demonstrators actually attributed the failed assault on the royal family to the demonstration of courage made by the behaviour of Élisabeth, and a female demonstrator was reported saying: "There was nothing to be done today; their good St. Genevieve was there."

Élisabeth herself described the Demonstration in a letter as follows:

"We were now at the King's window. The few persons who were with his valet came also to rejoin us. The doors were closed and a few minutes later we heard someone calling. It was Aclocque and some Grenadiers and Volunteers he had brought. He asked the King to show himself alone. The King passed into the first ante-room... At the moment that the King went into his ante-room some of the Queen's people obliged her to go back to her rooms. Happier than she, there was no one to force me to leave the King, and the Queen had hardly been dragged back when the door was burst open by the pikemen. At that moment the King got up on some chests which stood in the window, and the Marechal de Mouchy, MM. d'Hervelly, Aclocque, and a dozen grenadiers surrounded him. I remained near the wall encircled by Ministers, M. de Marsilly, and a few of the National Guards. The pikemen entered the room like lightning, they looked for the King, one in particular who, they say, said horrid things, but a Grenadier caught his arm, saying : ' Unhappy one, it is your King'. They at the same time cried Vive le Roy. The rest of the pikemen answered the cheer mechanically. The room was full in quicker time than I can write, all asking for the Sanction (for the decrees) and that the Ministers should be sent away. For four hours the same cry was repeated. Some members of the Assembly came soon afterwards. MM. Vergniaud and Isnard spoke very well to the people, telling them they were wrong to ask the King in this way for the Sanction, and tried to persuade them to retire, but their words were useless. ... At last Petion and other members of the municipality arrived. The first-named harangued the people, and after having praised the dignity and order with which they had come, he begged them to retire with the same calm, so that they might not be reproached with having given way to any excess during a fete Civique... But to return to the Queen, whom I left being forced back, against her will, to my nephew's apartment... She did everything in the world to return to the King, but MM. de Choiseul and de Hauteville and our women who were there prevented her... The Grenadiers entered the Council Chamber and put her and the children behind the Table. The Grenadiers and others who were much attached to them, surrounded them, and the crowd passed before them. A woman put a red cap on the Queen's head and on my nephew's. The King had one almost from the first. Santerre, who led the file, harangued her, and told her people had misled her in saying that the people did not love her; they did, and he could assure her she had nothing to fear. 'One never fears anything when one is with good people,' she replied, holding out her hand at the same time to the grenadiers near her, who all threw themselves upon it to kiss it. It was very touching... A real deputation arrived to see the King, and as I heard this and did not wish to remain in the crowd, I left an hour before he did. I rejoined the Queen, and you can guess with what pleasure I embraced her."

After the Demonstration of 20 June, Élisabeth as well as the King reportedly despaired for the future "as an abyss from which they could only escape by a miracle of Providence," but she continued to act as the King's political adviser, and Mme de Lage de Volude described her state at this point: "She spends her days in prayer and in devouring the best books on our situation. She is full of noble and generous sentiments: her timidity changes to firmness when it is a question of speaking to the King and of informing him as to the state of things."

The royal court was warned that there would be an attack on the palace, and royalist noblemen gathered there to defend the royal family on 9 August, sleeping everywhere they could find a place. During the following day, awaiting the attack, the queen, accompanied by the royal children, Élisabeth, and the princesse de Lamballe, went about the palace to encourage the defenders, and then followed the King when he inspected the Swiss Guards in the interior of the palace – they did however not accompany him when he visited the guards posted outside of the palace.

On 10 August 1792, when insurgents attacked the Tuileries, the king and queen were advised by Count Roederer to leave the palace and seek refuge in the Legislative Assembly for their own safety, as it would be impossible to defend the palace. When she heard this, Élisabeth asked Roederer: "Monsieur Roederer, you will answer for the lives of the King and Queen?" He replied "Madame, we answer for it that we will die at their side; that is all we can guarantee."

The royal family, including Élisabeth, then went to the National Assembly. M. de la Rochefoucauld described them:

"I was in the garden, near enough to offer my arm to Madame la Princesse de Lamballe, who was the most dejected and frightened of the party; she took it. The King walked erect ... the Queen was in tears; from time to time she wiped them away and strove to take a confident air, which she kept for a little while, but I felt her tremble. The Dauphin was not much frightened. Madame Élisabeth was calm and resigned, religion inspired her... The little Madame wept softly. Madame la Princesse de Lamballe said to me, 'We shall never return to the Château'."

When Élisabeth saw the crowd she reportedly said: "All those people are misled. I desire their conversion, but not their punishment."

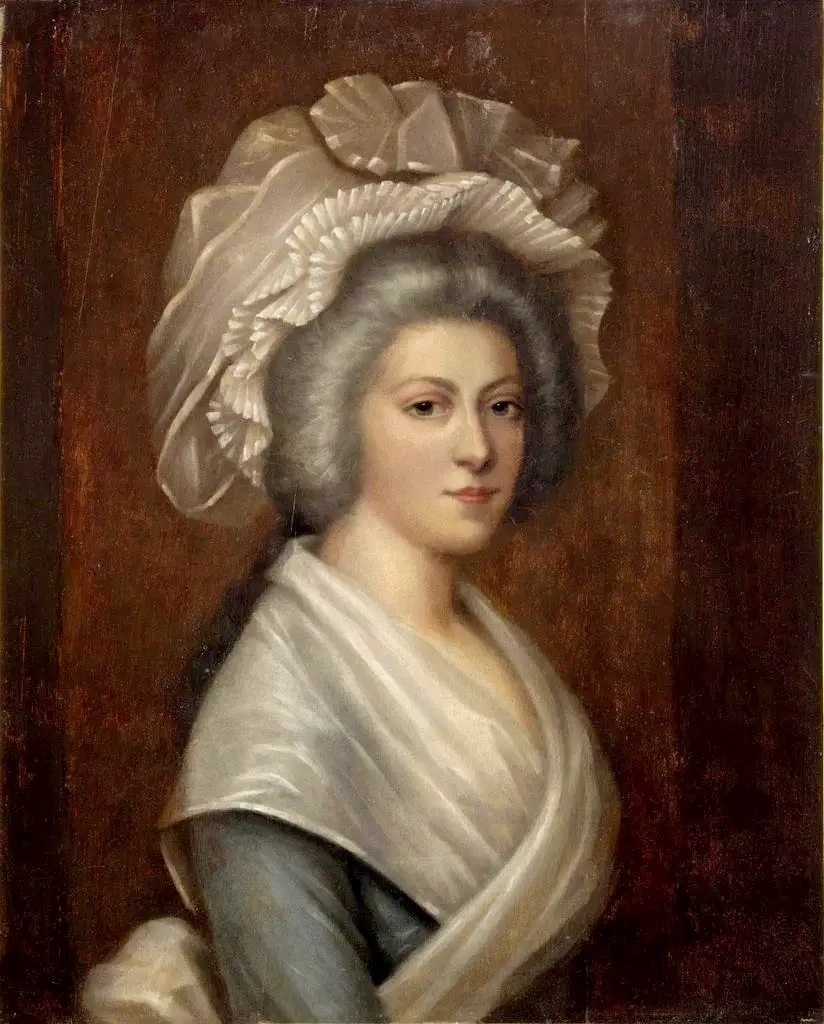
Portrait of Madame Élisabeth in the Temple, by Alexander Kucharsky

Élisabeth was described as calm in the assembly, where she witnessed, later on in the day, her brother's dethronement. She followed the family from there to the Feuillants, where she occupied the fourth room with her nephew, Tourzel, and Lamballe. During the night, there were reportedly some women outside on the street who cried for the heads of the King, Queen, and Élisabeth, upon which the King took offence and asked "What have they done to them?" referencing the threats against his spouse and sister. Élisabeth reportedly spent the night awake in prayer. They were joined at the Feuillants by some of their retinue, among them Pauline de Tourzel. The whole family was transferred to the Temple Tower three days later. Before leaving the Feuillants, Élisabeth said to Pauline de Tourzel: "Dear Pauline, we know your discretion and your attachment for us. I have a letter of the greatest importance which I wish to get rid of before leaving here. Help me to make it disappear." They tore up an eight-page letter, but taking too long, Pauline swallowed the pages for her.

=== Temple ===
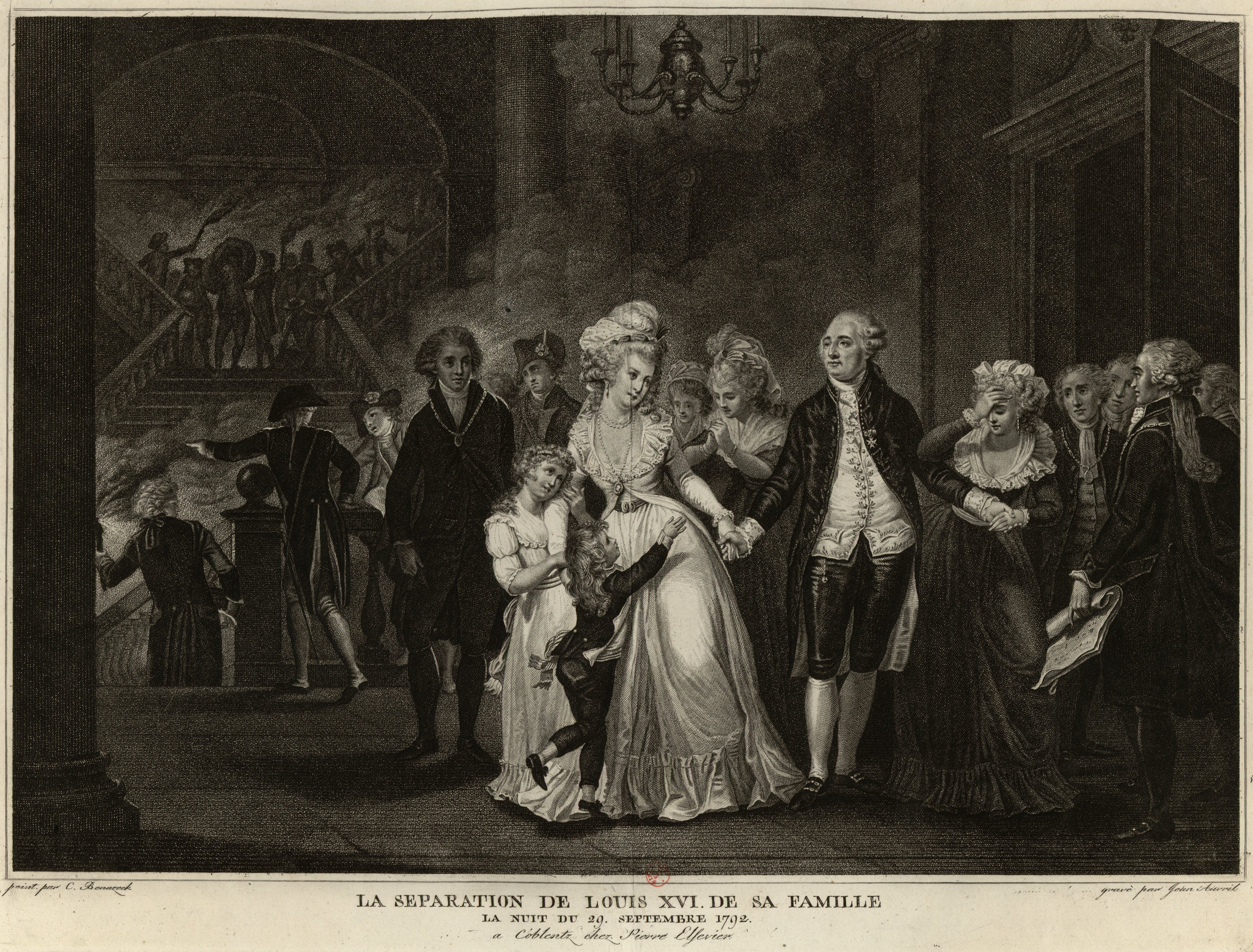
The farewell between the former Louis XVI and his family, including Élisabeth, before his execution

After the execution of the former king on 21 January 1793 and the separation of her nephew, the young 'Louis XVII', from the rest of the family on 3 July, Élisabeth was left with Marie Antoinette, and Marie-Thérèse Charlotte, Madame Royale, in their apartment in the Tower. The former queen was taken to the Conciergerie on 2 August 1793. When her sister-in-law was removed, both Élisabeth and her niece unsuccessfully requested to follow her; initially, however, they kept in contact with Marie Antoinette through the servant Hüe, who was acquainted with Mme Richard in the Conciergerie.

Marie Antoinette was executed on 16 October. Her last letter, written in the early hours of the day of her execution, was addressed to Élisabeth but never reached her. During the trial against Marie Antoinette, accusations of molestation of her son were brought against her, accusations which her son seemed to confirm when he was questioned, and which were directed also against Élisabeth, and Marie Antoinette alluded to them in her letter, in which she asked Élisabeth to forgive her son: "I must speak to you of something very painful to my heart. I know how much this child must have hurt you. Forgive him, my dear sister. Think of his age and of how easy it is to make a child say what one wants and what he does not even understand."

Élisabeth and Marie-Thérèse were kept in ignorance of Marie Antoinette's death. On 21 September, they were deprived of their privilege to have servants, which resulted in the removal of Tison and Turgy and thereby also of their ability to communicate with the outside world through secret letters. Élisabeth focused on her niece, comforting her with religious statements of martyrdom, and also unsuccessfully protested against the treatment of her nephew. Marie-Thérèse later wrote of her: "I feel I have her nature . . . [she] considered me and cared for me as her daughter, and I, I honoured her as a second mother".

== Trial ==
Élisabeth was not regarded as dangerous by Robespierre, and the original intention had been to banish her from France. In the order of 1 August 1793, which stated for the removal and trial of Marie Antoinette, it was in fact stated that Élisabeth should not be tried, but exiled: "All the members of the Capet family shall be exiled from the territory of the Republic, with the exception of Louis Capet's children, and the members of the family who are under the jurisdiction of the Law. Élisabeth Capet cannot be exiled until after the trial of Marie Antoinette."

However, Pierre Gaspard Chaumette alluded to the Temple as "a special, exceptional, and aristocratic refuge, contrary to the spirit of equality proclaimed by the Republic [...] representing to the General Council of the Commune the absurdity of keeping three persons in the Temple Tower, who caused extra service and excessive expense", and Jacques Hébert insisted on her execution. Although Robespierre himself wished to avoid such a "useless cruelty", the political climate was such that he "hid his thought of reprieve under words of insult. He dared not claim that innocent woman from the ferocious impatience of Hébert without insulting the victim he desired to save. He called her the 'despicable sister of Capet'."

On 9 May 1794, Élisabeth, referred to only as "sister of Louis Capet", was transferred to the Conciergerie by a delegation of commissaries headed by Monet acting upon the orders of Antoine Quentin Fouquier-Tinville. Élisabeth embraced Marie-Therese and assured her that she would return. When Commissary Eudes stated that she would not return, she told Marie-Therese to show courage and trust in God. Two hours later she was brought before the Revolutionary Tribunal in the Conciergerie and subjected to her first interrogation before judge Gabriel Delidge in the presence of Fouquier-Tinville.

She was accused of having participated in the secret councils of Marie Antoinette; of having entertained correspondence with internal and external enemies, among them her exiled brothers, and conspired with them against the safety and liberty of the French people; of supplying émigrés with funds financing their war against France by selling her diamonds through agents in the Netherlands; of having known and assisted in the King's Flight to Varennes; of encouraging the resistance of the royal troops during the events of 10 August 1792 to arrange a massacre on the people storming the palace.

Élisabeth stated that she knew for a fact that Marie Antoinette had not held secret councils; that she had only known and had contact with friends of France, and had no contact with her exiled brothers since she left the Tuileries; that she had not provided émigrés with funds; that she had not known of the Flight to Varennes beforehand and that its purpose had not been to leave the country but only retire to the countryside for the King's health and that she had accompanied her brother on his orders; she also denied having visited the Swiss Guard with Marie Antoinette during the night before the 10 August 1792.

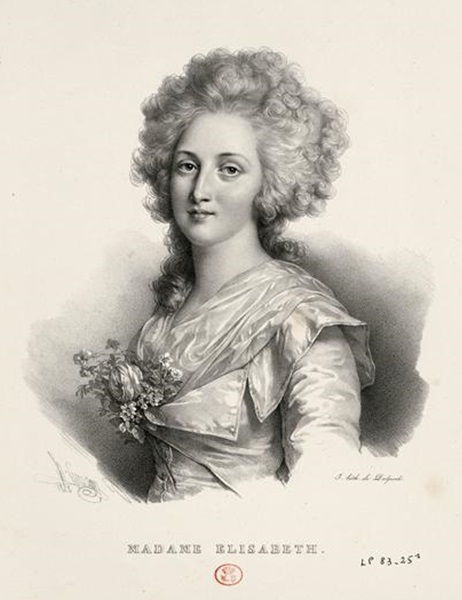
Madame Élisabeth by François-Séraphin Delpech, c.1823

After the interrogation, she was escorted to a single cell. She refused a public defender but seemed to have named Claude François Chauveau-Lagarde as her defensor, as he was called by someone claiming to be sent by her. He was not allowed to see her that day, as he was told by Fouquier-Tinville that she would not be tried for some time and there would be plenty of time to confer with her. However, she was in fact tried immediately the following morning, and Chauveau-Lagarde was thus forced to appear at the trial as her defender without having spoken to her beforehand. Élisabeth was tried with 24 accused accomplices (ten of whom were women), though she was placed "at the top of the seats" during the trial and thus more visible than the rest. She was reportedly dressed in white and she attracted a great deal of attention, but was described as serene and calming on the rest.

Her trial was conducted by René-François Dumas, President of the Tribunal, supported by the Judges Gabriel, Deliege, and Antoine Marie Maire. During the trial, the same questions were made to her as during the interrogation, and she answered in much the same way. Relating to the accusation that she had encouraged the Swiss Guard and the royalist defenders against the attackers during the 10 August riot, she was asked: "Did you not take care of and dress the wounds of the assassins who were sent to the Champs-Élysées against the brave Marseillais by your brother?" upon which she replied: "I am not aware that my brother sent assassins against any persons, whoever they may be. I gave succour to several of the wounded. Humanity alone prompted me to dress their wounds. In order to comfort them I had no need to enquire into the origin of their misfortunes. I claim no merit for this, and I cannot imagine that this can be imputed to me as a crime." When asked whether she did not refer to her nephew as king, ignoring the fact that France was a republic, her reply: "I talked familiarly with the poor child, who was dear to me on more than one account; I, therefore, gave him the consolation which appeared to me capable of comforting him for the loss of those to whom he owed his being." This was interpreted as a sign that she "nourished the little Capet with the projects of vengeance which you and yours have not ceased to form against Liberty, and that you flattered yourself with the hope of raising again a broken throne by inundating it with the blood of patriots."

Her defender Chauveau-Lagarde later recollected his speech in her defence:

"I observed, that the Process consisted of a list of banal accusations, without documents, without questions, without witnesses, and that, in consequence, where there existed no legal element of conviction there could be no legal conviction. I added that therefore they could only offer in opposition to the august accused, her replies to the questions they had made to her, as it was in these replies alone that the whole matter consisted; but that these answers themselves, far from condemning her, would, on the contrary, bring her honour in everyone's eyes, as they proved nothing but the goodness of her heart and the heroism of her friendship. Then, after developing these first ideas, I concluded by saying that instead of a Defence of Mme Elizabeth I had only to present her Apology, but that, In the impossibility of discovering one worthy of her, It only remained for me to make one remark, which was, that the Princess who in the Court of France had been the most perfect model of all virtues, could not be the enemy of the French."

Dumas replied to her defender's "audacity to speak of what he called the pretended virtues of the Accused and to have thus corrupted public morality", and then held his speech to the Jury: "Plots and conspiracies have existed formed by Capet, his wife, his family, his agents, his accomplices, in consequence of which there have been provocations to war from the allied Tyrants abroad, and civil war at home. Succours in men and arms have been furnished to the enemy; troops have been assembled; dispositions taken; chiefs named to assassinate the people, annihilate liberty, and re-establish despotism. Anne Elizabeth Capet – is she an accomplice in these plots?"

The Jury declared Elisabeth and all of her 24 co-accused guilty as charged, after which the Tribunal, "according to the fourth Article of the second part of the Penal Code", condemned them to death and to be guillotined the following day. One of her co-accused was reprieved from execution because of pregnancy. In the notes of the trial of Nicolas Pasquin, her valet of the chambers, she is referred to as the sister of the tyrant Capet. Pasquin, at the age of 36 years, was also sentenced to death for his own alleged part in the conspiracy of 10 August 1792, and executed on 6 February.

When she left court, Fouquier-Tinville remarked to the President: "One must allow that she has not uttered a complaint", upon which Dumas replied: "Of what should Elizabeth of France complain? Have we not today given her a court of aristocrats worthy of her? There will be nothing to prevent her fancying herself still in the salons of Versailles when she sees herself, surrounded by this faithful nobility, at the foot of the holy guillotine."

== Execution ==
After her trial, Élisabeth joined the prisoners condemned with her in the Hall of the Condemned, awaiting their execution. She asked for Marie Antoinette, upon which one of the female prisoners said to her, "Madame, your sister has suffered the same fate that we ourselves are about to undergo."

She reportedly successfully comforted and strengthened the morale of her fellow prisoners before their impending execution with religious arguments, and by her own example of calmness: "She spoke to them with inexpressible gentleness and calm, dominating their mental suffering by the serenity of her look, the tranquillity of her appearance, and the influence of her words. [...] She encouraged them to hope in Him who rewards trials borne with courage, sacrifices accomplished," and said: "We are not asked to sacrifice our faith like the early martyrs, but only our miserable lives; let us offer this little sacrifice to God with resignation". She said to Athanase Louis Marie de Loménie, comte de Brienne, who felt indignation at the way in which Fouquier had imputed his popularity among his former constituents in Brienne as a crime: "If it is grand to merit the esteem of one's fellow-citizens, it is much finer, believe me, to merit God's mercy. You showed your countrymen how to do good. Now show them how one dies when one's conscience is at peace," and to Madame de Montmorin, who was in despair of being executed together with her son: "You love your son, and you do not wish him to accompany you? You are going to enjoy the joys of heaven, and you wish him to remain on this earth, where there is now only torments and sorrow!"

Élisabeth was executed along with the 23 men and women who had been tried and condemned at the same time as her and reportedly conversed with Mme de Senozan and Mme de Crussol on the way. In the cart taking them to their execution, and while waiting her turn, she helped several of them through the ordeal, encouraging them and reciting the De profundis until her time came. Near the Pont Neuf, the white kerchief which covered her head was blown off, and thus being the only person with a bare head, she attracted special attention from the spectators, and witnesses attested that she was calm during the whole process.

At the foot of the guillotine, there was a bench for the condemned who were to depart the cart and wait on the bench before their execution. Élisabeth departed the cart first, refusing the help of the executioner, but was to be the last to be called upon, which resulted in her witnessing the death of all the others. The first to be called upon was Mme de Crussol, who bowed for Élisabeth and asked to embrace her; after Élisabeth consented, all the following women prisoners were given the same farewell, while the men bowed before her, and each time, she repeated the psalm "De Profundis". This attracted attention, and one spectator commented: "They may make her salaams if they like, but she will share the fate of the Austrian." Reportedly, she considerably strengthened the morale of her fellow prisoners, who all behaved with courage. When the last person before her, a man, gave her his bow, she said, "courage, and faith in the mercy of God!" and then rose to be ready for her own turn. While she was being strapped to the board, her fichu (a sort of shawl) fell off, exposing her shoulders, and she cried to the executioner "Au nom de votre mère, monsieur, couvrez-moi. (In the name of your mother, sir, cover me)".

Reportedly, her execution caused some emotion among the bystanders, who did not cry "Vive la Republique" on this occasion, which was otherwise common. The respect which Élisabeth had enjoyed among the public caused concern with Robespierre, who had never wished to have her executed and who "dreaded the effect" of her death. On the evening of the execution, he asked Bertrand Barère what people were saying and was given the reply: "They murmur; they cry out against you; they ask what Mme Élisabeth did to offend you; what were her crimes; why you sent this innocent and virtuous person to the scaffold." Robespierre replied: "Well, you understand, it is always me. I assure you, my dear Maret, that, far from being the cause of the death of Mme Élisabeth, I wished to save her. It was that wretch Collot d'Herbois who snatched her from me."

Her body was buried in a common grave at the Errancis Cemetery in Paris. At the time of the Restoration, her brother Louis XVIII searched for her remains, only to discover that the bodies interred there had decomposed to a state where they could no longer be identified. Élisabeth's remains, with that of other victims of the guillotine (including Robespierre, also buried at the Errancis Cemetery) were later placed in the Catacombs of Paris. A medallion represents her at the Basilica of Saint Denis.

== Cause of beatification and canonization ==
Servant of God Élisabeth of France
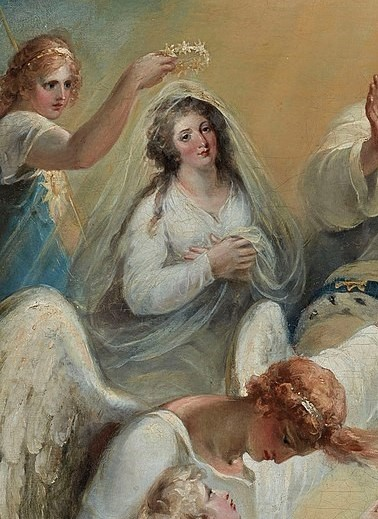
- Detail of the painting The Apotheosis of Louis XVI by William Hamilton, with Princess Elizabeth wearing the crown of martyrs, circa 1795-1800
- Cause of death: Decapitation
- Resting place: Catacombs of Paris, Paris, France

The beatification process was introduced in 1924 In 1953, Pope Pius XII recognized by decree the heroic nature of Elisabeth's virtues. On 15 November 2017, Cardinal André Vingt-Trois, the Archbishop of Paris, promulgated the edict that officially opened the cause. The investigation on diocesan level was opened on 2 May 2024.

In 2016, Cardinal André Vingt-Trois, Archbishop of Paris, reactivated the cause of Princess Élisabeth's beatification. Xavier Snoëk, a former parish priest of the Parish of Sainte-Élisabeth de Hungary, being appointed postulator for the cause (church located in the former Temple district where the princess was imprisoned), and in May 2017 recognized the association faithful promoters of her cause.

On 15 November 2017, Vingt-Trois, after consulting the Conference of Bishops of France and the nihil obstat of the Congregation for the Causes of Saints in Rome, hopes that the process will lead to the canonization of Princess Elisabeth, sister of Louis XVI.

Snoëk has suggested an alternate path for the beatification of Élisabeth based on the motu proprio Maiorem hac dilectionem promulgated by Pope Francis on 11 July 2017. Because her indictment made no reference to her religion, she was not killed in 'odium fidei' (hatred of the faith) and therefore might not be considered a martyr. If she is not considered a martyr, Snoëk points out that a miracle that occurred after Élisabeth's death and obtained through her intercession remains necessary.

Snoëk for Élisabeth's cause promotes that she could be a patron saint for single people, as she found meaning in her life through her commitment and faith, rather than a romantic relationship.

== Assessment ==
Élisabeth, who had turned thirty a week before her death, was executed essentially because she was a sister of the king; however, the general consensus of the French revolutionaries was that she was a supporter of the ultra-right royalist faction. There is much evidence to suggest that she actively supported the intrigues of the Comte d'Artois to bring foreign armies into France to crush the Revolution. In monarchist circles, her exemplary private life elicited much admiration. Élisabeth was much praised for her charitable nature, familial devotion and devout Catholic faith. There can be no question that she saw the Revolution as the incarnation of evil on earth and viewed civil war as the only means to drive it from the land.

Several biographies have been published of her in French, while extensive treatment of her life is given in Antonia Fraser's biography of Marie Antoinette and Deborah Cadbury's investigative biography of Louis XVII.

== Ancestors ==
Ancestors of Élisabeth of France

8. Louis, Duke of Burgundy
4. Louis XV of France
9. Marie Adélaïde of Savoy
2. Louis, Dauphin of France
10. Stanisław I Leszczyński
5. Marie Leszczyńska
11. Katarzyna Opalińska
1. Élisabeth of France
12. Augustus II of Poland
6. Augustus III of Poland
13. Christiane Eberhardine of Brandenburg-Bayreuth
3. Maria Josepha of Saxony
14. Joseph I, Holy Roman Emperor
7. Maria Josepha of Austria
15. Wilhelmine Amalia of Brunswick

== Sources ==
- Chisholm, Hugh, ed. (1911). "Elizabeth of France" . Encyclopædia Britannica. Vol. 9 (11th ed.). Cambridge University Press. pp. 286–287.

=== Primary sources ===
- (in French) Duchess of Angoulême's Memoirs on the Captivity in the Temple (from the autograph manuscript; see in particular Part 3)
- Duchess of Angoulême's Memoirs on the Captivity in the Temple, (1823 English translation of a slightly redacted French edition; see in particular Part 3)
