= Charles-René de Bombelles =

French soldier and officer

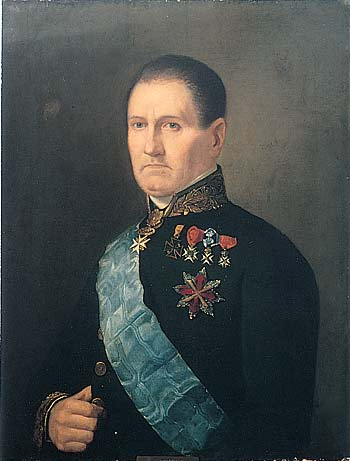
- 1830 portrait
- Born: November 6, 1784; Versailles, France
- Died: May 30, 1856 (aged 71); Versailles, France
- Occupations: Nobleman; military officer
- Spouse(s): Caroline de Poulhariez de Saint André de Foucaud (m. 1814; died 1819) Marie Louise, Duchess of Parma (m. 1834; died 1847)

Charles-René de Bombelles (6 November 1784 – 30 May 1856) was a French émigré nobleman, soldier, and the third husband of Marie Louise, Duchess of Parma. Marie Louise was the widow of the French emperor Napoleon, and her marriage to Charles was morganatic. Charles had served in the Austrian army during the Napoleonic Wars, and he was Grand Chamberlain to Marie Louise prior to their marriage.

== Early life ==
Charles-René de Bombelles was born in Versailles on 6 November 1784 and was the third child and third son of Marc Marie, Marquis de Bombelles and Marie-Angélique de Bombelles, as well as the grandson of Henri François de Bombelles. He was either one of seven children - six of whom survived to adulthood, or one of four children, all of whom survived to adulthood. Among his siblings were Louis Phillipe (the Count of Bombelles, chamberlain to the Emperor of Austria and Austrian ambassador to Denmark), Henri François de Bombelles (tutor of Francis-Joseph, Emperor of Austria), Caroline Antoinette de Bombelles (lady of honour to the Duchess of Berry and wife of François de Biaudos de Casteja).

His family, being nobles, fled from France to Austria during the French Revolution. When he reached his teens, he joined "the Austrian Mittrowsky regiment as ensign." In 1804, after some time in the military, was promoted to captain. In 1814, after the defeat of Napoleon, he returned to France to serve as aide-de-camp to Karl Philipp, Prince of Schwarzenberg, who was "the commander-in-chief of the coalition armies." Charles remained in Paris, serving as the Prince's aide-de-camp until he became a lieutenant of infantry.

In 1814, soon after returning to France, Charles married Caroline Sabine Victoire de Poulhariez de Saint André de Foucaud. They had two children: a son, Louis de Bombelles, born 1817; and a daughter, Marie de Bombelles, born 1819. Soon after, Charles was widowed. It is unclear when exactly Caroline died (some sources place her death in 1834), but primary sources suggest that she died in Vienna in 1819, leaving her husband a widower with two children.

== Marriage to Marie Louise ==
Marie Louise, the estranged consort and later widow of Napoleon, was awarded the Duchy of Parma in the Treaty of Fontainebleau (1814). Her Grand Chamberlain was her morganatic second husband, Austrian diplomat Adam Albert von Neipperg, who died in 1829. His replacement, Josef von Werklein, proved unsatisfactory.

Prince Metternich suggested Bombelles as new Grand Chamberlain. Charles initially declined this offer, but after some consideration, he relented, and, "at 48 years of age", Charles became the Grand Chamberlain of Parma.

He was reportedly an extremely scrupulous Chamberlain. A Mr. Challiot wrote:

He came into a country distracted by feuds and indignant at the strong measures which it had been necessary to take in order to sweep away the former abuses... By degrees he [Charles] filled up the court appointments, which had become vacant--appointing persons who had earned the respect of the public. The accounts were kept with severe regularity. A budget drawn up every year assigned to each department and amount which was never exceeded; on the contrary there was very often a surplus. As far as was possible, everything supplied to the court, and all works required for the Ducal residence, were issued for tender and open to competition. Each department was minutely organized, all expenses were settled and paid once a month. A balance sheet showing receipts and expenditure was drawn up yearly, and submitted for audit to the Treasury of the Duchies, before being presented to her Majesty.

After he had served as Grand Chamberlain for some time, Marie Louise grew quite close to him. She proposed marriage to Charles, and on 17 February 1834, Charles and Marie-Louise were secretly married. The marriage was morganatic; Marie Louise was a duchess, and he was a lesser noble and military officer with no clear title aside from Captain (and, later, Count). Upon their marriage, he assumed the title of Minister of Defence.

Not much is known about their marriage, though they seemed to be happy and affectionate towards each other. Marie Louise and Charles remained married until her death on December 17, 1847. They had no children, and he stayed by her side over the course of the few days that she was on her deathbed. In her will, she left her stepdaughter and his daughter, Marie, "the ivory crucifix which hung from the curtains of her bed, and which would receive her last breath" and publicly declared their marriage to one another. Along with this, she also left him "the sum of 300,000 Italian livres, in Milanese bonds", as well as her portrait by François Gérard, all of her books, and her manuscripts.

== Later life ==
Soon after Marie Louise's death, Charles returned to Vienna, Austria, where he served in the court of Emperor Ferdinand I of Austria. After this service, he returned to France, where he died in Versailles aged 71.
