= Gustave Louis Chaix d'Est-Ange =

French politician and lawyer

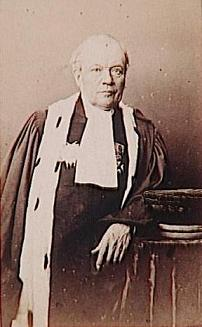
Gustave Louis Chaix d'Est-Ange

Gustave Louis Adolphe Victor Aristide Charles Chaix d'Est-Ange (11 April 1800, Reims - 14 December 1876, Paris) was a French lawyer and politician.

== Sources ==
- This article contains text from a document on the La vie rémoise site.
- "Gustave Louis Chaix d'Est-Ange", in Adolphe Robert and Gaston Cougny, Dictionnaire des parlementaires français (1789-1891), Bourloton, Paris, 1889 Edition details Wikisource
