= Libelle (literary genre) =

Political pamphlet which libels a public figure

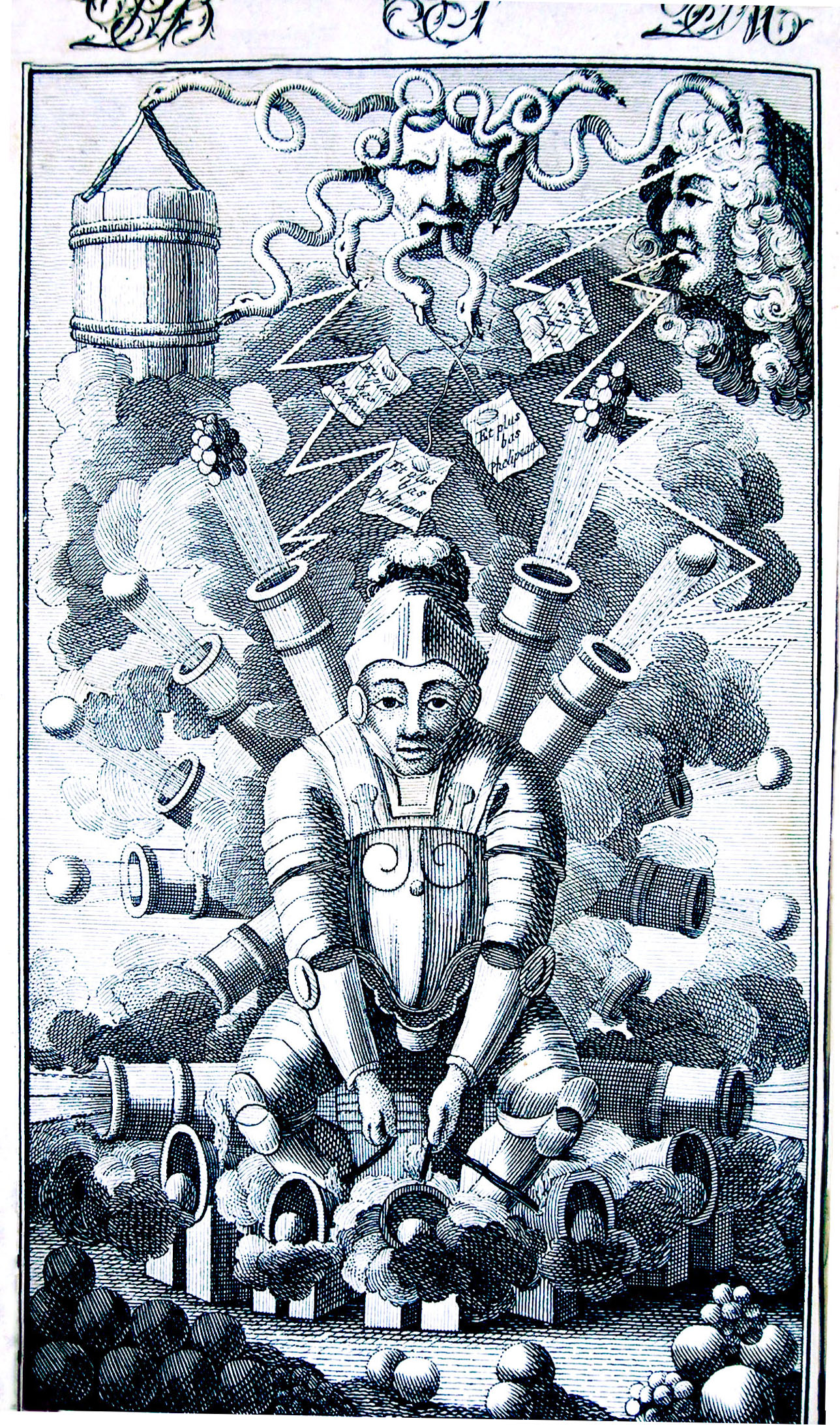
Gazetier Cuirassé

A libelle is a political pamphlet or book that libels a public figure. Libelles held particular significance in France under the Ancien Régime, especially during the eighteenth century, when the pamphlets' attacks on the monarchy became both more numerous and venomous. In recent years, cultural historian Robert Darnton has written on the libelles, arguing for their subversive power of the late eighteenth century exercised in undermining monarchical authority.

== Etymology ==
The French word libelle is derived from the Latin libellus, for "small book". Although originally it was used to describe pamphlets in general, it became primarily applicable to the genre of brief and defamatory attacks on pre-revolutionary French public figures. The 1762 edition of the dictionary published by the Académie française defines the libelle as an "offensive work". The publishers of libelles were known as libellistes.

== Format and style ==
Libelles varied widely in format and style, with some early libelles consisting of either a half-sheet or a single sheet in octavo format. Some later libelles, published in the eighteenth century for example, were book-length, or even ran into multiple volumes. Regardless of their format, the libelles were cohesive in their overblown and sensationalist style; they were full of wordplay, and often employed literary techniques such as metaphor. The libelles were defiant against authority, and spoke out against prominent individuals.

== History ==
Libelles were invariably of a political nature, both defamatory and subversive. They proliferated during times of political crises, from the sixteenth to eighteenth centuries.

=== Religious conflict: the 1580s ===
In the 1580s, during the French Wars of Religion, libelles flourished, with an average of about one occasionnel published per day in Paris. Libelles were published in support of both the Catholic and the Protestant points of view. Catholic libelles were typically pointed at the King, attacking primarily his weak religious beliefs and portraying him as not only godless, but evil. The Protestant libelles accused the Catholic League of treasonously supporting the pope.

=== La Fronde: 1648–1653 ===
During the civil war known as the Fronde, libelles proliferated in France, numbering around 5,000 in the years 1648–1653. During the Fronde, the majority of libelles were directed against Cardinal Mazarin, the chief minister of France. These libelles were referred to as Mazarinades. They ridiculed Mazarin for a wide variety of things, including his low birth, his luxurious proclivities and speculated on his erotic liaison with the Queen Mother, Anne of Austria. One of the most famous of these characterized Mazarin as follows:

Buggering bugger, buggered bugger,
Bugger to the supreme degree,
Hairy bugger and feathered bugger,
Bugger in large and small volume,
Bugger sodomizing the State,
And bugger of the purest mixture ...

— Paul Scarron, La Mazarinade (1651)

These libelles excited concerns on the part of the government. Presumably alarmed by the seditious possibilities of the libelles, the Parlement of Paris issued an ordinance against libellistes, declaring that anyone caught producing such pamphlets would be hanged. This ran the business of libelles underground, and many libellistes relocated to Holland—or affected to on the title pages; there they continued to publish their slander.

=== Pre-Revolution: 1770s–1780s ===
Perhaps the most numerous and scathing libelles came out of the two decades prior to the French Revolution. Darnton lists five ways in which the libelles of the 1770s and 1780s differed from their ancestors.

- First, the later libelles differed in their scale. Eighteenth-century libelles were much heftier volumes than their single (or half) sheet predecessors. Some libelles of this period ran as large as thirty-six volumes. The fact that such pamphlets were beginning to be compiled into books increased the longevity of the libelles.
- Second, the system which distributed the libelles had changed. The publishing industry which circulated eighteenth-century libelles was increasingly vast, and no longer localized.
- Third, the way in which the libelles attacked public figures had advanced. In eighteenth-century libelles, the sex lives of the public figures who were attacked were contextualized as contemporary history.
- Fourth, the way that libelles conceptualized their victims had changed. Even when earlier libelles attacked Louis XIV, a sense of respect and even deference was implied in the writings. By the 1770s, the way that the libelles conceptualized Louis XV was much less respectful, and implied that the monarch was a mere womanizer, with no interest in state affairs. Marie Antoinette fared even worse, as the number of pornographic libelles that involved her proliferated into the revolutionary era.
- Fifth, later libelles seemed to criticize monarchy as a system, whereas early libelles only attacked individual figures. It was implied in the earlier pamphlets that individual figures, such as Mazarin, were responsible for the State's problems. With the libelles of the later years, however, the attack was focused against the entire governmental system, and monarchy as a whole.
