= Andrew Zega =

French painter

Andrew Zega (born 1961) is an American-born artist, architectural historian and writer residing in Paris, France. He was educated at Princeton University and began his career as an architectural designer and watercolorist for Robert A.M. Stern Architects in Manhattan.

Andrew Zega and Bernd H. Dams both create watercolors of historic American and European buildings and garden ornament. Their work is noted for its realist technique and historical accuracy. The artists, both trained architects, employ the conventions of architectural rendering to re-create destroyed and altered monuments in their initial state, as well as to present unbuilt projects with exceptional realism. The chief value of their work is the enlarged and precise view it thus offers of European—and particularly French—architectural history.

Their expertise is Ancien Régime French architecture—that of the 17th and 18th centuries—and particularly French royal châteaux and gardens, most notably the Château de Versailles and the Château de Marly, the monumental estates of King Louis XIV. In various publications, they have re-examined the genesis of both châteaux, and have renounced the traditional authorship of Versailles to Louis Le Vau in favor of a triumvirate of Le Vau, Charles Le Brun and Claude Perrault; and have attributed Marly's creation to Le Brun, renouncing the traditional attribution to Jules Hardouin-Mansart.

Their watercolors are held in many private and public collections, including those of: The New-York Historical Society, The Cooper-Hewitt National Design Museum, The Museum of the Île-de-France, Princeton University, Jayne Wrightsman, Brooke Astor, Robert Denning, Hubert de Givenchy, and Oscar de la Renta.

They have written numerous books illustrated with their work, among them: Pleasure Pavilions and Follies (Flammarion, 1995), Garden Vases (Alain de Gourcouf Editeur, 2000), Palaces of the Sun King (Rizzoli, 2002), Chinoiseries (Connaissance et Mémoires, 2006 and Rizzoli, 2008), Central Park, NYC (Rizzoli, 2013), and Visions of Arcadia (Rizzoli, 2023). Beside the value of their reconstruction drawings, the books are notable for their analysis of architecture and its accompanying social history from an architect's perspective, which is highly unusual in a field dominated by writers trained as art historians.
