= Voćin massacre (disambiguation) =

Voćin massacre may refer to:

- 1991 Voćin massacre, the killing of 43 Croat civilians in Voćin, during the Croatian War of Independence
- 1942 Voćin massacre, the killing of 350 Serb civilians in Voćin, during World War II

See also:

- Voćin killings, the 1991 disappearance and murder of 24–40 Serb civilians in and around Voćin, during the Croatian War of Independence
