= Opeka Arboretum =

Arboretum in Croatia

Coordinates: 46°19′32″N 16°08′57″E

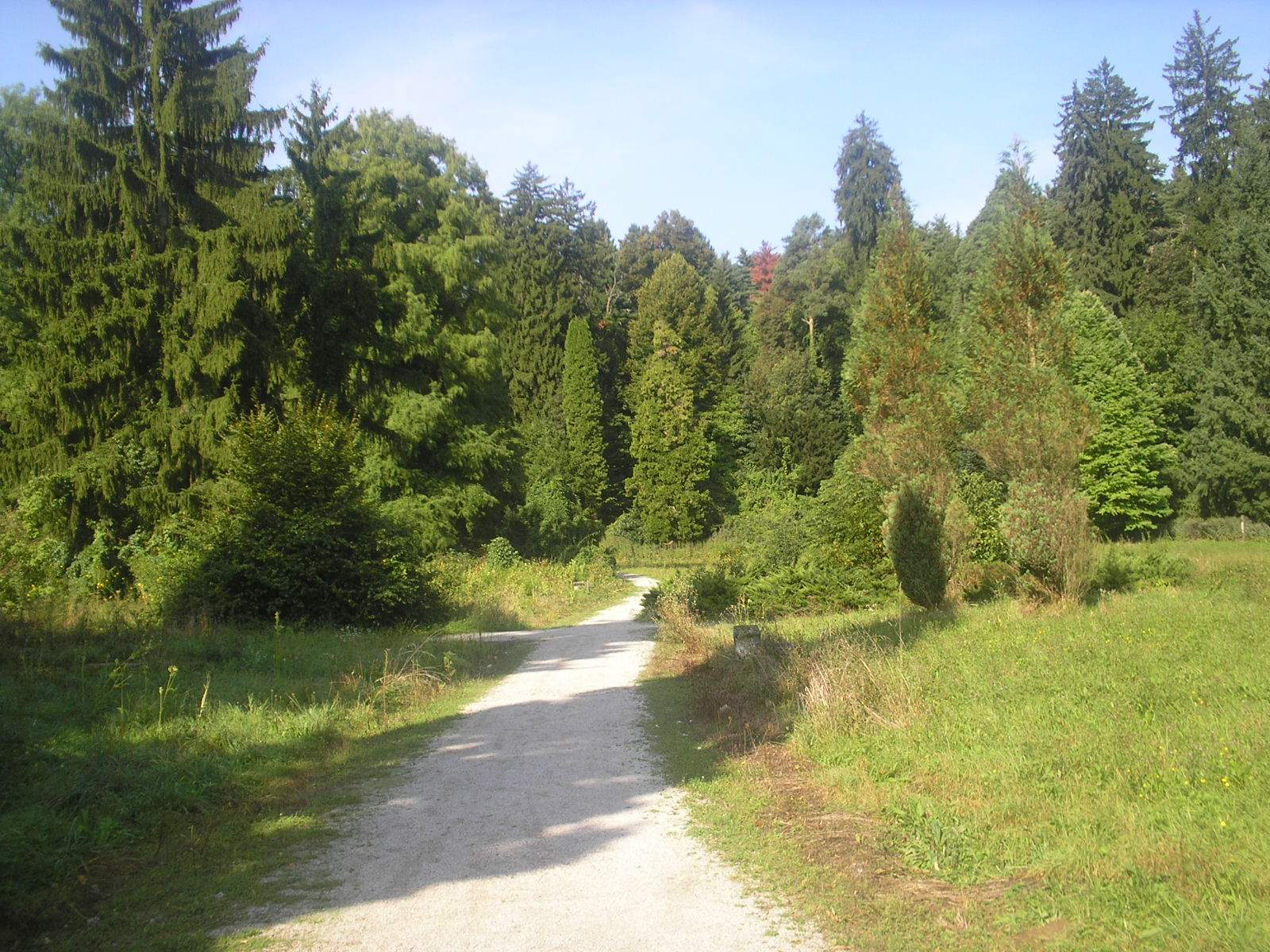
Opeka Arboretum

Opeka Arboretum is situated in the Vinica municipality, northern Croatia.

Located in a large park surrounding a manor, Opeka arboretum, with its 65 hectares, is the largest of the three arboreta existing today in Croatia (the others are Trsteno in southern Dalmatia and Lisičine near Voćin in western Slavonia).

The arboretum was founded in 1860 by the Count Marko Bombelles, who travelled a lot all over the world and brought back various exotic seeds and plants from his travels, expanding his garden and park all the time with exceptional care. The Opeka estate remained the ownership of Bombelles family until 1945.

The arboretum passed into Yugoslav state ownership in 1945 and was declared a natural rarity in 1947. Today it has been managed by the local Agricultural and veterinary school.

== Gallery ==
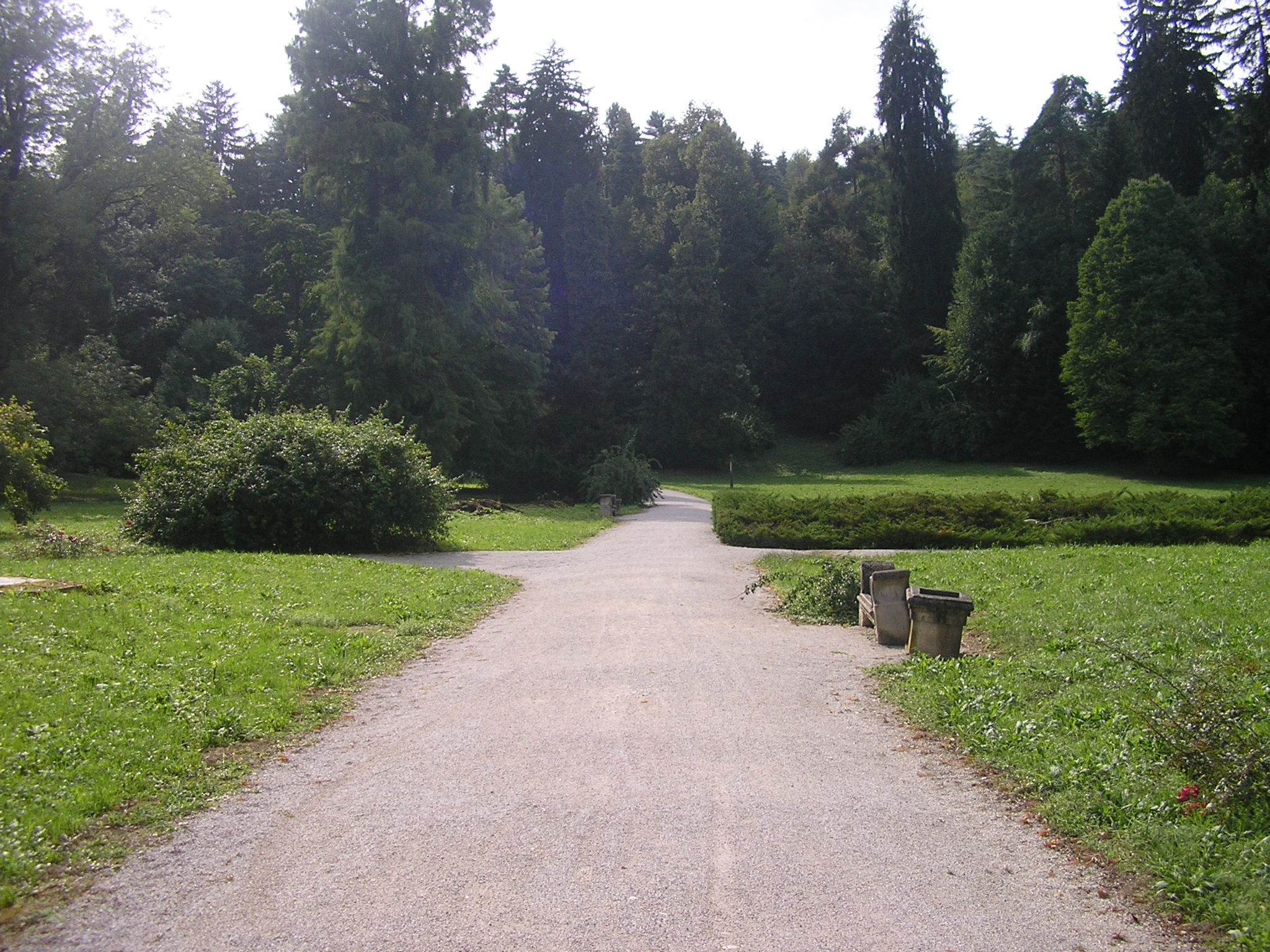

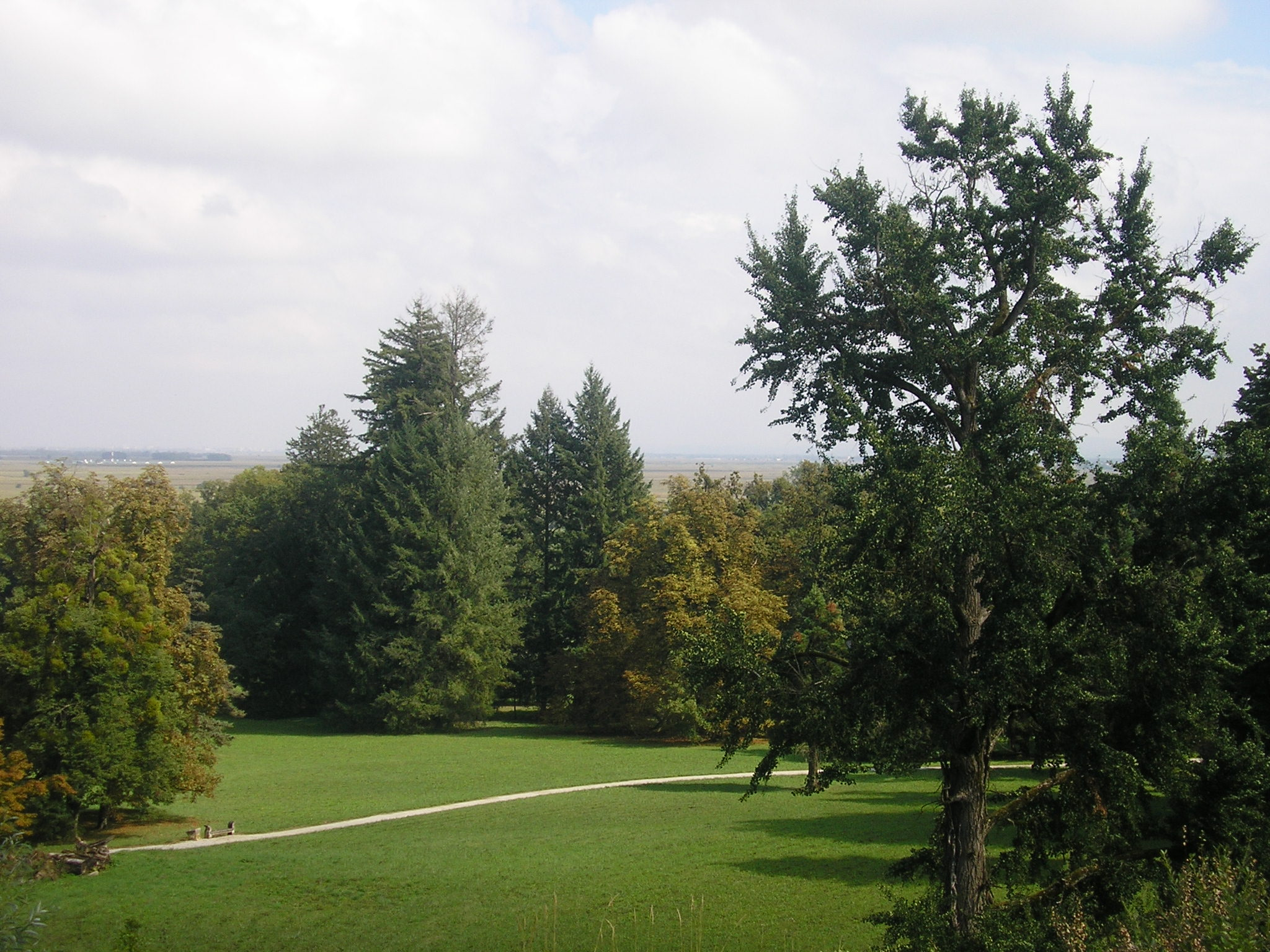

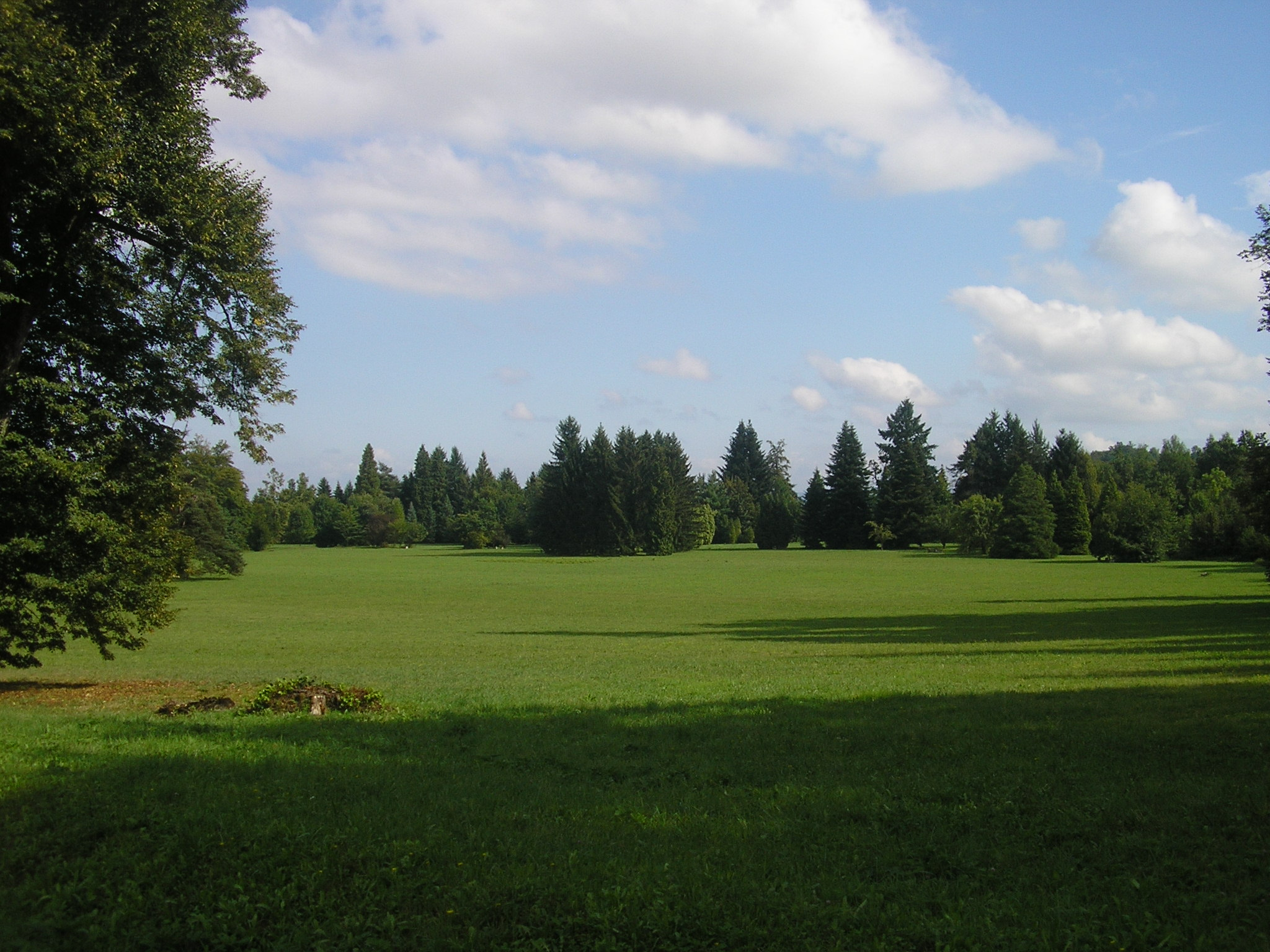

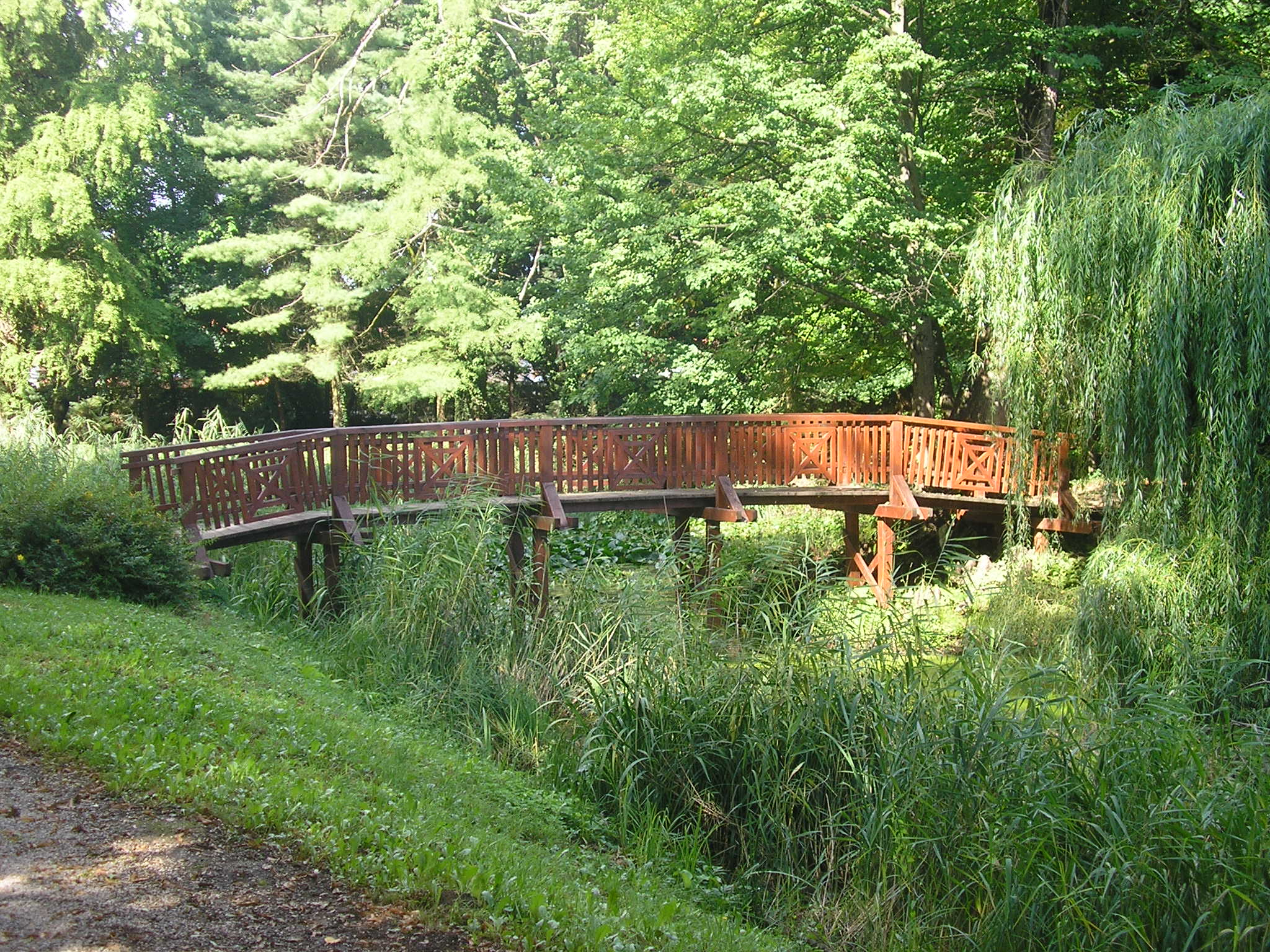

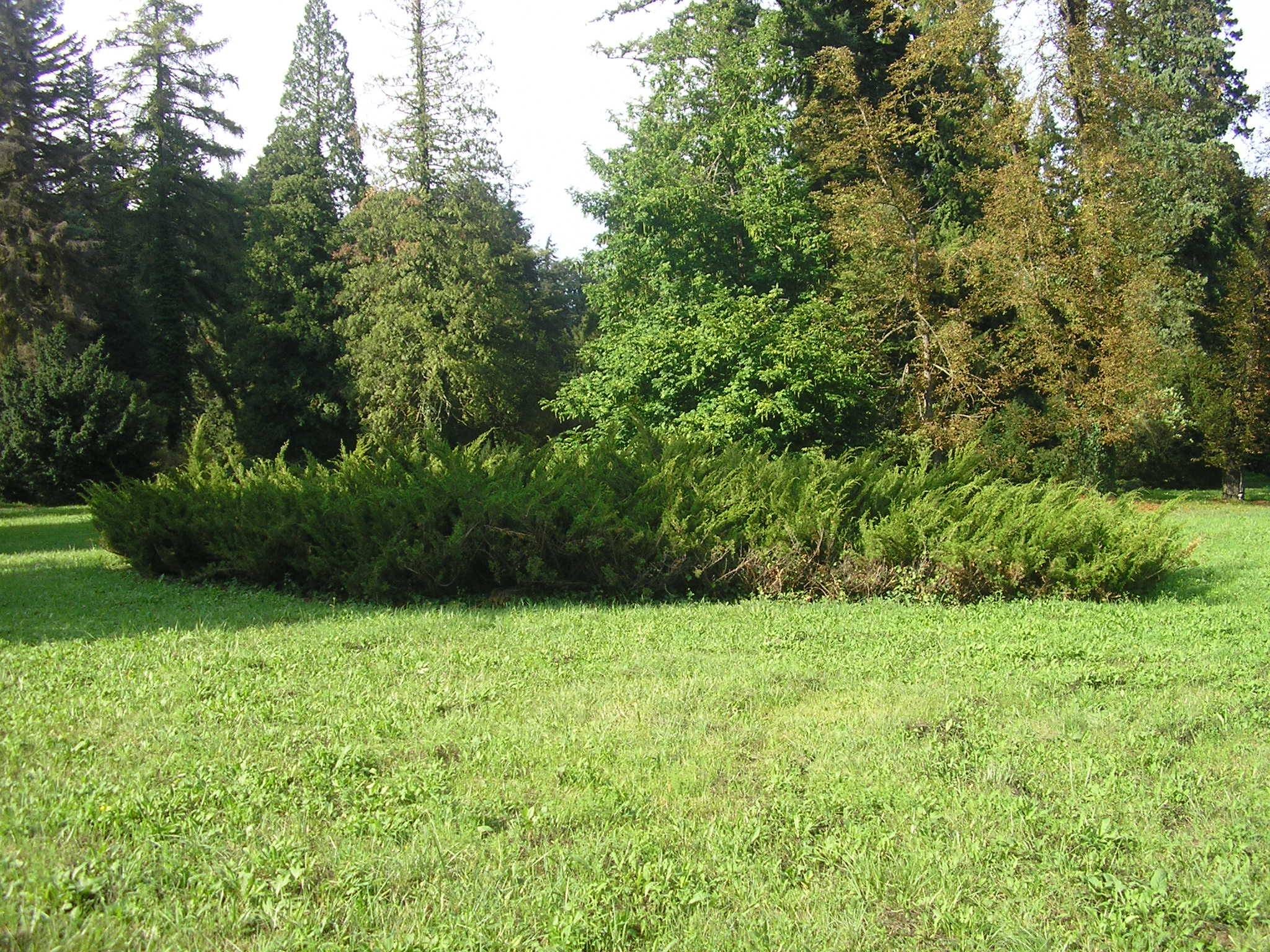

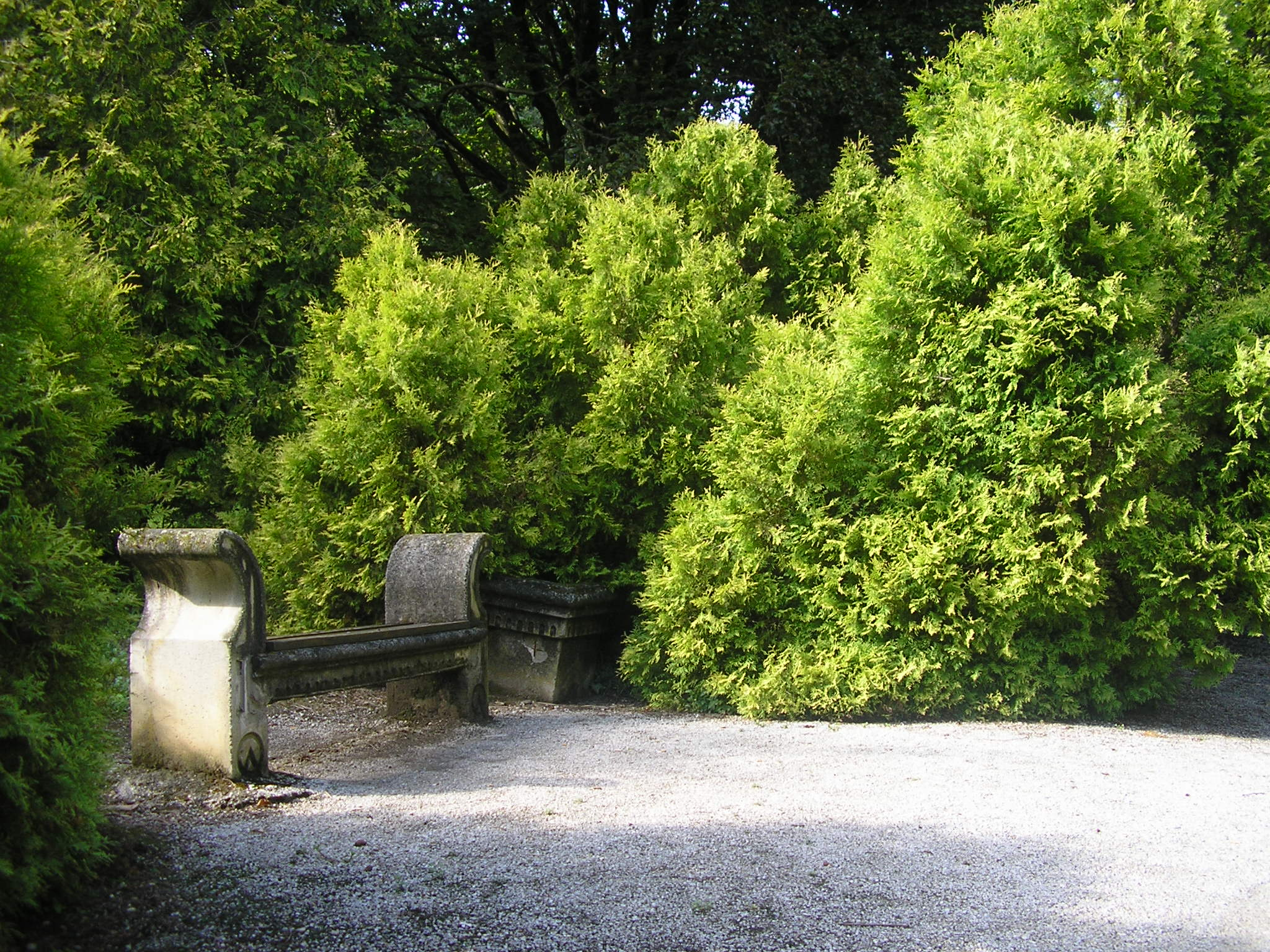
