= Dobrić =

Dobrić may refer to:

- Dobrić, Šabac, a village in Serbia
- Dobrić, Virovitica-Podravina County, a former village in Croatia
- Gornji Dobrić, a village near Loznica, Serbia
- Donji Dobrić, a village near Loznica, Serbia
- Dobrić Dobričević (1454–1528), Croatian printer also known as Bonino de Boninis
- Dragan Dobrić (born 1986), Serbian football player
- Lazar Dobrić (c. 1755–1803), Serbian hajduk also known as Laza Harambaša
- Ognjen Dobrić (born 1994), Serbian basketball player
- Saša Dobrić (born 1982), Serbian football player
- Dobrić, Šekovići, a village near Šekovići, Bosnia and Herzegovina
