= Lisičine =

- Village
- Location of Lisičine in Croatia
- Coordinates: 45°39′N 17°30′E
- Country: Croatia
- Region: Continental Croatia
- County: Virovitica-Podravina County
- Municipality: Voćin

Area
  - Total: 16.3 km^{2} (6.3 sq mi)
- Elevation: 168 m (551 ft)

Population (2021)
  - Total: 0
  - Density: 0.0/km^{2} (0.0/sq mi)
- Time zone: UTC+1 (CET)
  - Summer (DST): UTC+2 (CEST)
- Postal code: 33522
- Area code: (+385) 33

Lisičine is an uninhabited settlement in Croatia, in the municipality of Voćin, Virovitica-Podravina County.

== History ==
Lisičine village is one of many villages established in the course of 16th century around the Voćin fortification in order to provide soldiers to defend the border against the Ottoman invasion.

== Culture ==
In 1748, a wooden Orthodox church of St. George, consecrated by the Bishop of Pakrac and Slavonia, Sofronije Jovanović, was built. A masonry church built in 1869 was damaged in the World War II while its liturgical items and books were all destroyed. The church was restored in 1990, only to be severely damaged in 1991 and its interior burned. The iconostasis was transferred to the treasury of the metropolitan court in Srijemski Karlovci to be restored and become a part of its permanent exhibition.

== Demographics ==
According to the 2011 census, the village of Lisičine has no inhabitants.

Population of the Lisičine village by ethnicity:

Year of census	total	Serbs	Croats	Yugoslavs	others
2011	0	-	-	-	-
2001	6	n/a	n/a	n/a	n/a
1991	160	154 (96.25%)	2 (1.25%)	4 (2.50%)	-
1981	199	197 (99.00%)	1 (0.50%)	1 (0.50%)	-
1971	297	296 (99.66%)	1 (0.34%)	-	-

Population change 1857-2011
v

population	537	585	510	644	706	796	769	804	467	488	410	297	199	160	6
	1857	1869	1880	1890	1900	1910	1921	1931	1948	1953	1961	1971	1981	1991	2001	2011

Sources: Croatian Bureau of Statistics publications

== Sights ==
- Lisičine Arboretum - one of the three arboretums in Croatia

== Notable natives and residents ==
- Nikola Miljanović Karaula - antifascist, partisan and People's Hero of Yugoslavia
- Đuro Jorgić - forestry graduate who established the Lisičine Arboretum
- Milenko Jorgić (1956-1991) - JNA captain and military pilot

== See also ==
- Voćin massacre
