= Đuričić, Croatia =

Đuričić
- Village
- Location of Đuričić in Croatia
- Coordinates: 45°34′N 17°41′E
- Country: Croatia
- Region: Continental Croatia
- County: Virovitica-Podravina County
- Municipality: Voćin

Area
  - Total: 7.2 km^{2} (2.8 sq mi)
- Elevation: 171 m (561 ft)

Population (2021)
  - Total: 0
  - Density: 0.0/km^{2} (0.0/sq mi)
- Time zone: UTC+1 (CET)
  - Summer (DST): UTC+2 (CEST)
- Postal code: 33 522
- Area code: (+385) 33

Đuričić is an uninhabited settlement in Croatia, in the municipality of Voćin, Virovitica-Podravina County.

== Demographics ==
According to the 2011 census, the village of Đuričić has no inhabitants.

The 1991 census recorded that all inhabitants were ethnic Serbs.

Historical population 1857-2011
v

population	201	197	206	244	242	248	219	276	231	237	186	154	97	89	2
	1857	1869	1880	1890	1900	1910	1921	1931	1948	1953	1961	1971	1981	1991	2001	2011

Sources: Croatian Bureau of Statistics publications
