= Opeka Manor =

Coordinates: 46°19′30″N 16°08′52″E

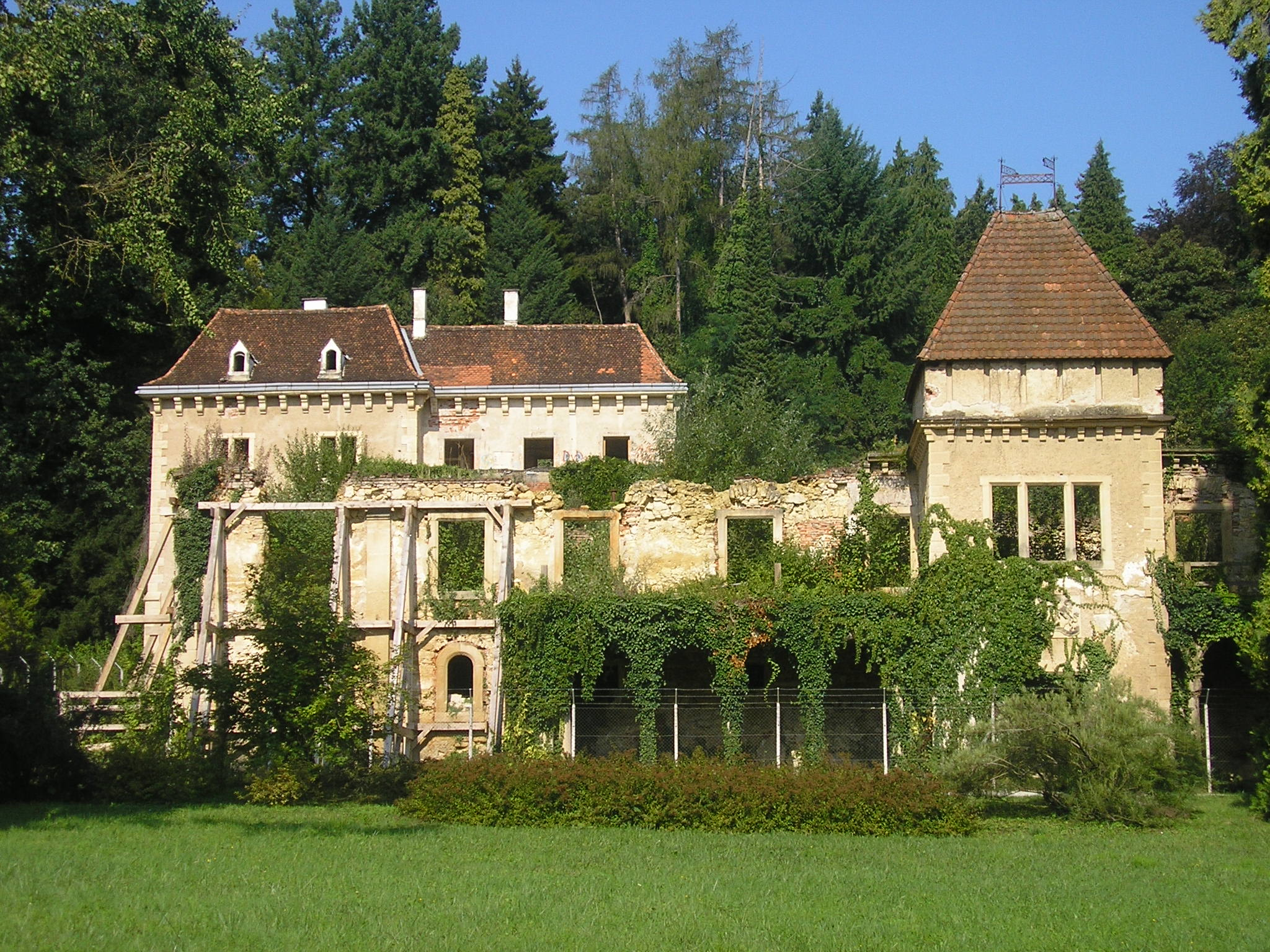
Dvorac Opeka

Opeka Manor (also known as Bombelles Manor) is a castle in the Vinica municipality, Varaždin County, northern Croatia.

Located in the surrounding park with a large arboretum, the manor is situated below the Macelj forest in the northern part of Hrvatsko Zagorje historic region. It was founded in the 17th century by the Counts of Keglević and later owned by the Counts of Nadasdy, then Drašković and finally Bombelles (until 1945).

Today the manor is weathered and longs for renewal.

== Literature ==
- Obad Šćitaroci, Mladen; Bojanić Obad Šćitaroci, Bojana; Dundović, Boris (2013). "Manors and Gardens in Northern Croatia in the Age of Historicism" (PDF). Centropa. pp. 175–186. ISSN 1532-5563. Archived from the original (PDF) on 2025-05-05.
