= Rupnica =

Coordinates: 45.604961°N 17.532028°E

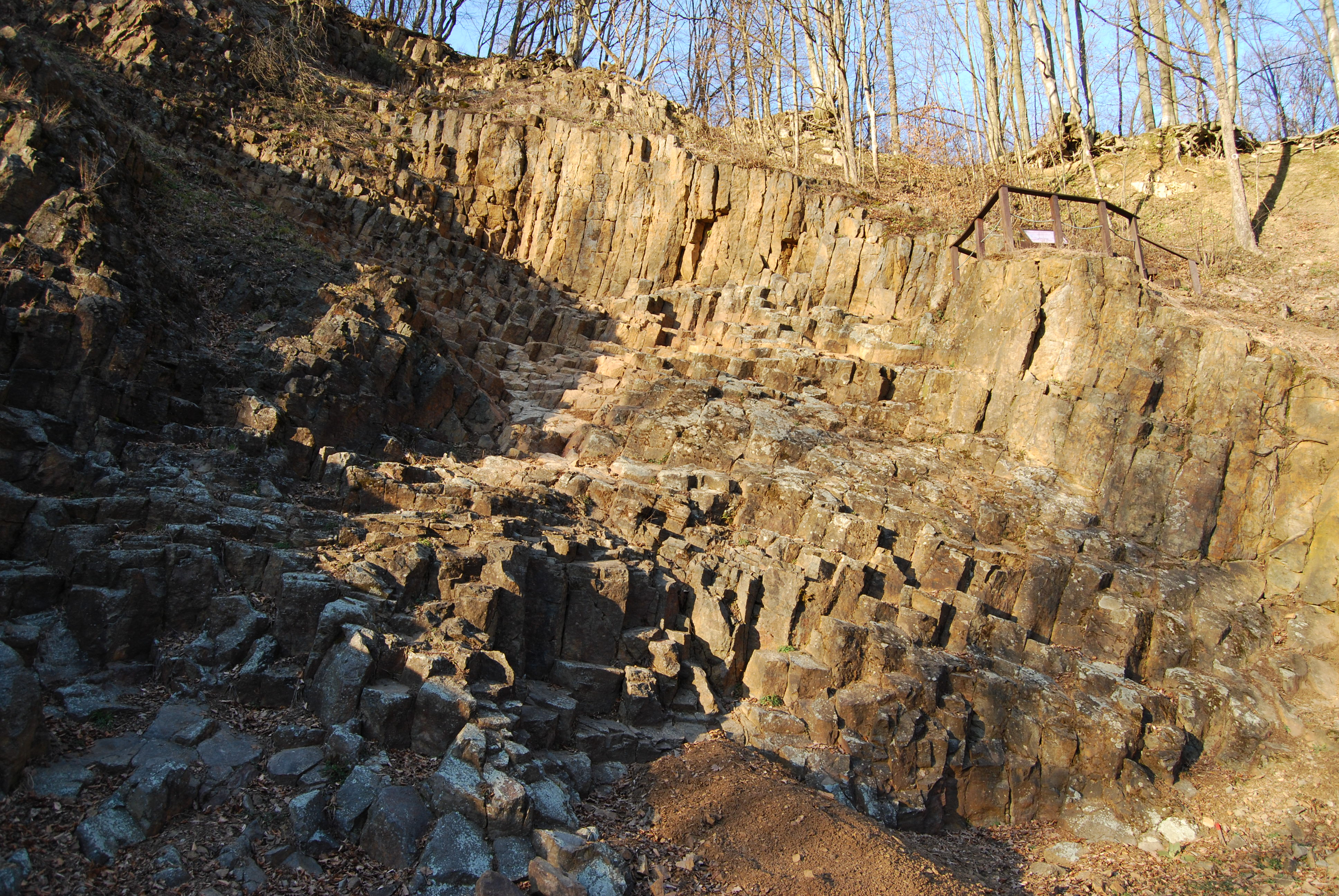
Columnar rhyolite at Rupnica

Rupnica is an outcrop of columnar-jointed rhyolite in Croatia. It lies in the southwest of Voćin. The site used to be a quarry but is now a natural heritage. On 14 October 1948 Rupnica was declared the first natural heritage site of Croatia.
