= Vinica, Varaždin County =

Croatian village and municipality

Vinica
- Location of Vinica in Croatia
- Coordinates: 46°20′09.96″N 16°08′57.84″E
- Country: Croatia
- County: Varaždin County

Area
  - City: 32.4 km^{2} (12.5 sq mi)
  - Urban: 9.9 km^{2} (3.8 sq mi)

Population (2021)
  - City: 3,020
  - Density: 93.2/km^{2} (241/sq mi)
  - Urban: 965
  - Urban density: 97/km^{2} (250/sq mi)
- Website: vinica.hr

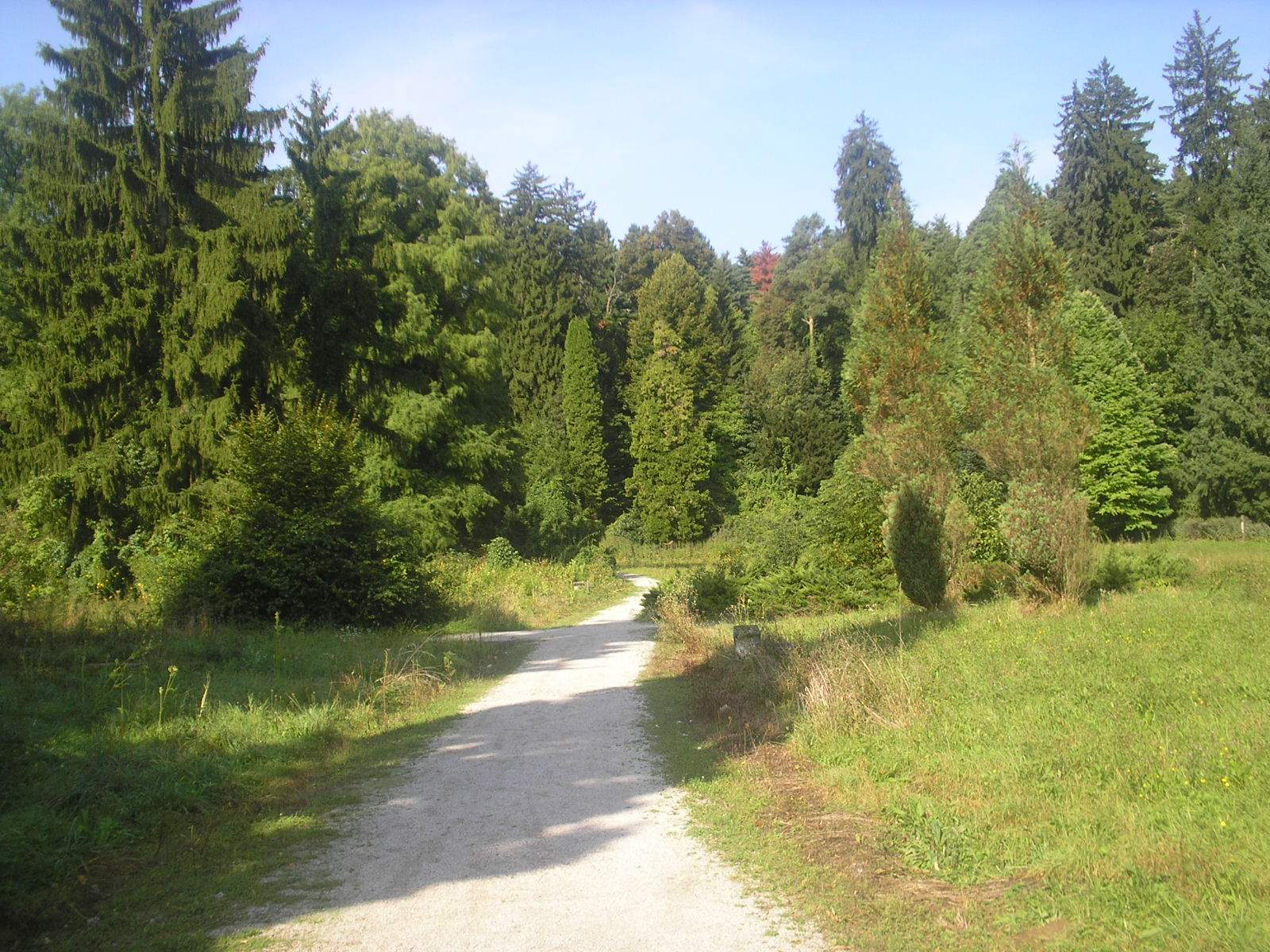
Opeka Arboretum near Vinica

Vinica is a village and municipality in Croatia in Hrvatsko Zagorje.

According to the 2011 census, there are 3,389 inhabitants, in the following settlements:

- Donje Vratno, population 289
- Gornje Ladanje, population 949
- Goruševnjak, population 74
- Marčan, population 598
- Pešćenica Vinička, population 125
- Vinica, population 1,075
- Vinica Breg, population 279

An absolute majority of population are Croats.

Vinica is a site of ancient Roman vineyards. Opeka Manor, surrounded by a large park, and the Opeka Arboretum are also located in Vinica.

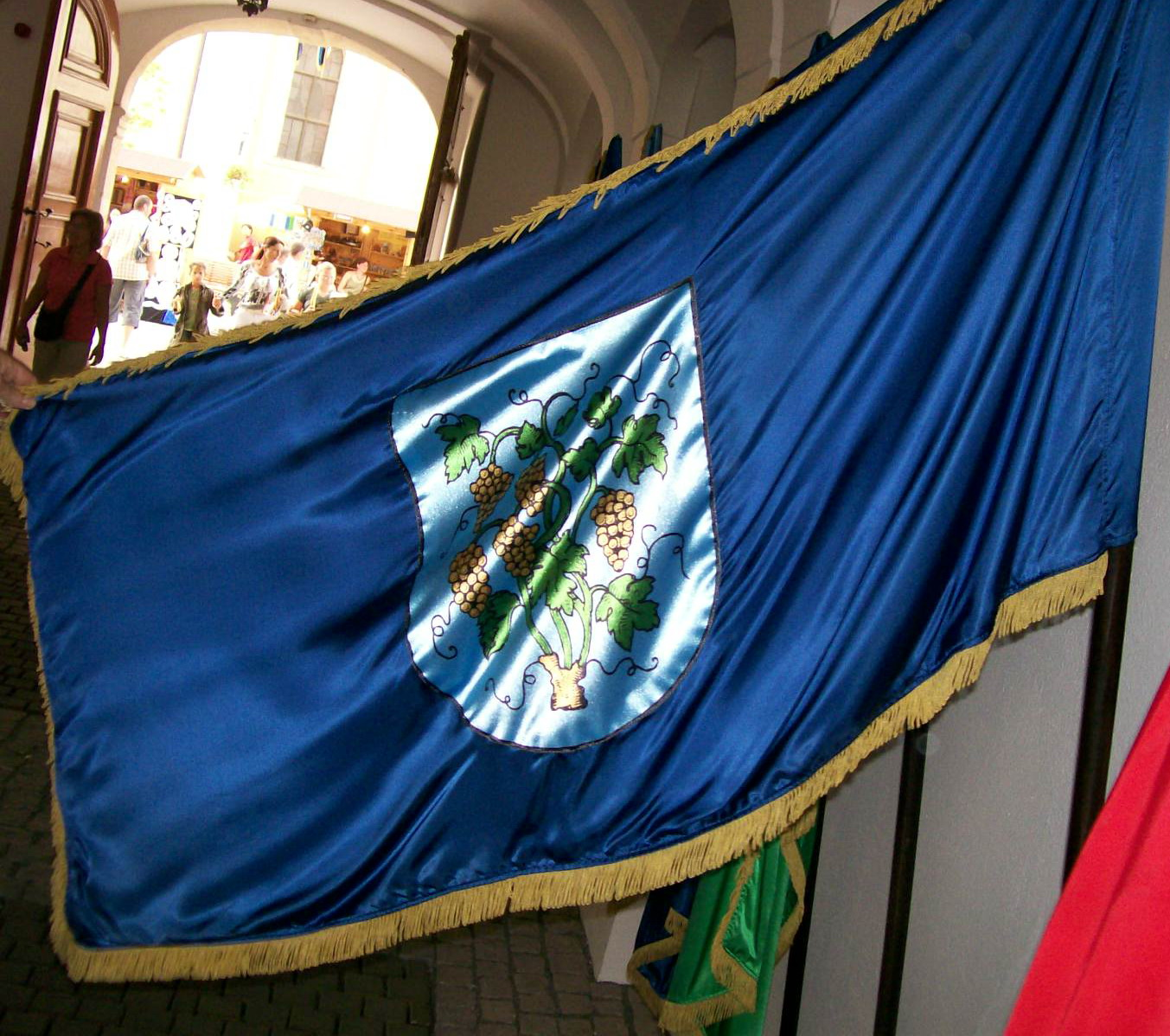
Flag of Municipality of Vinica
