= Church of the Visitation of the Blessed Virgin Mary, Voćin =

Church in Slavonia, Croatia

- Basilica of Our Lady of Voćin
- Crkva Pohođenja Blažene Djevice Marije u Voćinu
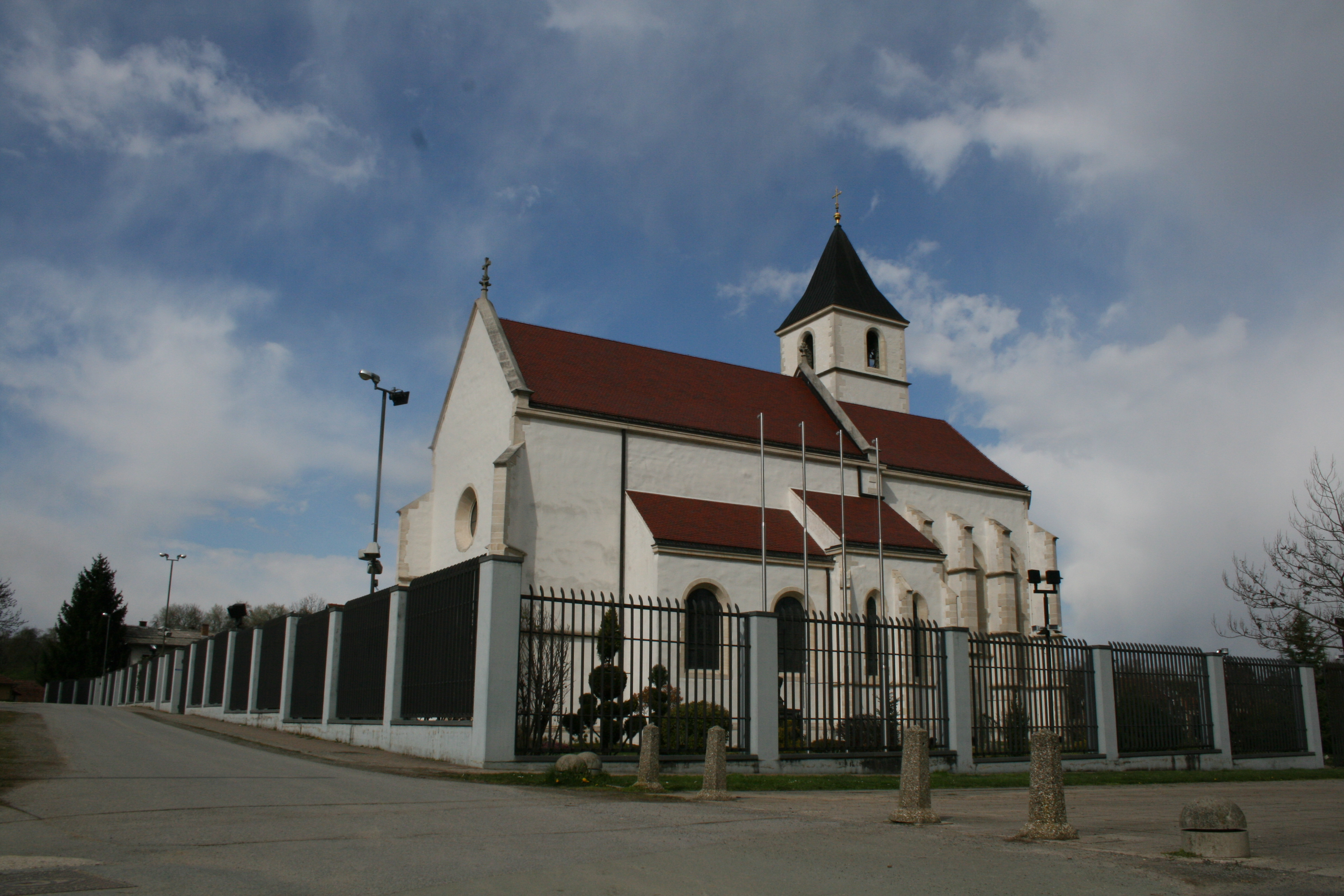
- Church of the Visitation of the Blessed Virgin Mary, Voćin
- 45°37′13″N 17°32′46″E
- Location: Voćin, Croatia
- Country: Croatia
- Denomination: Catholic Church
- Sui iuris church: Latin Church

History
- Status: Basilica
- Dedication: Visitation
- Consecrated: 2011

Architecture
- Functional status: Active
- Designated: 1464, 2011
- Architectural type: Gothic architecture

Administration
- Province: Đakovo-Osijek
- Diocese: Požega

The Church of the Visitation of the Blessed Virgin Mary in Voćin, also known as the Basilica of Our Lady of Voćin, is a Catholic church located in Voćin, Croatia.

== Background ==
The church was originally built in 1464 by the Franciscan friars as monastery church of All Saints. During the Ottoman invasion in 16th and 17th century the church was let to ruin. It underwent a renovation during the 18th century when it was consecrated to the Visitation of the Blessed Virgin Mary. During the World War II the church was burned, and because of the Communist government it was not rebuild until 1984. Not long after, in 1991 during the Croatian War of Independence it was almost complexity destroyed by the Serb paramilitary group White Eagles that occupied Voćin. The church was rebuilt again and consecrated in 2011 by the bishop Antun Škvorčević.

In 2022 the church received a title of the minor basilica.
