= 1942 Voćin massacre =

Massacre of Serbs by Ustaše

Voćin massacre
- Voćin on the map of Croatia.
- Location: 45.619861°N 17.547813°E; Voćin, Independent State of Croatia (today Croatia)
- Date: 14 January 1942
- Target: Serb civilians
- Attack type: Summary executions
- Deaths: 350
- Perpetrator: Ustaše

The Voćin massacre was the killing of 350 Serb civilians in Voćin, Independent State of Croatia, by the Ustaše Croatian fascist organization on 14 January 1942, during World War II. The massacre was carried out as retaliation against the partisans' action in Papuk.

== Background ==
On 12 January 1942, in a direct fight between the Partisans and the Ustaše, five Ustaše were killed, and two wounded, one of whom died later.

The Partisans withdrew to Papuk, and Ustaše returned to Voćin and waited for reinforcements from Osijek, Belišće and Virovitica.

== Massacre ==
On 13 January, some 300 Ustaše and Domobran soldiers began with plundering and burning Serbian houses. Civilians who tried to escape or resisted were killed and all others were arrested and taken to Voćin.

On the Serbian New Year, January 14, the biggest slaughter of the innocent population in Slavonia at that time started. Almost all the male inhabitants of the villages Jorgići, Zubovići, Dobrići, Kometnik and Sekulinci were killed.

During the massacre, a total of 350 civilians were killed.

=== Acts of individual heroism ===
They led us to a small basement, and as there was no place for everyone, some were forced to lay down. From the group, I was saved by the gendarme sergeant Luka Mustafić, because he noticed that I was a boy of 15 years. He took me by the hand, pulled out of the cellar, took me to the municipal premises and let me go when everything was over, after the shooting. He managed to save nine more people who had the task of burying the dead. The fact that he had helped the Serbs and anti-fascists caused him problems; they began to threaten him, so he fled to Slavonski Brod.

— Savo Bojčić, the only living witness of the massacre, Novosti

In addition to the victims, some managed to save many Serbs from Voćin and its surroundings. The Croat gendarme sergeant Luka Mustafić managed to save the lives of 10 Serbs during the massacre.

== Aftermath ==
On the following day, Ustaše transported Serb corpses to a mass grave that was excavated east of Voćin, along the Voćinka river.

The most significant consequence of this crime was the strengthening of the partisan movement in the area of Voćin and Podravska Slatina, exactly the opposite effect of what NDH's authorities tried to achieve. Although during 1941 and early 1942 there were not many local residents in favor of active resistance, due to increasing existential threats, a large number of Serbs from the surrounding villages joined the partisan units.

A memorial to the victims of this massacre was erected in 2007.
