= Voćin =

- Village
- Flag Coat of arms

- Location of Voćin in Croatia
- Coordinates: 45°37′04″N 17°32′52″E
- Country: Croatia
- County: Virovitica-Podravina County

Area
  - Village: 296.6 km^{2} (114.5 sq mi)
  - Urban: 54.5 km^{2} (21.0 sq mi)
- Elevation: 215 m (705 ft)

Population (2021)
  - Village: 1,896
  - Density: 6.392/km^{2} (16.56/sq mi)
  - Urban: 956
  - Urban density: 17.5/km^{2} (45.4/sq mi)
- Time zone: UTC+1 (CET)
  - Summer (DST): UTC+2 (CEST)
- Postal code: 33522
- Area code: (+385) 33
- Website: vocin.hr

Voćin is a village and municipality in western Slavonia, Croatia, located southwest of Slatina and east of Daruvar. The population of the municipality is 1,911, with 956 people living in Voćin itself (census 2021).

== Geography ==
Voćin, a pilgrimage site, is located in a valley of the Voćinska Rijeka at the foot of Papuk Mountain. The surrounding area is notable for the Lisičine arboretum, the special Sekulinačke Planine forest vegetation reserve.

== Climate ==
Since records began in 1981, the highest temperature recorded at the local weather station was 38.9 °C (102.0 °F), on 24 August 2012. The coldest temperature was −26.0 °C (−14.8 °F), on 9 February 2012.

== History ==
Voćin was first mentioned as "Achtyna" or "Othyna" in the 12th century. It was part of Verőce County and was known "Atyina". It was conquered by Ottoman Empire in 1543. During Ottoman rule, it was part of Sanjak of Pojega. It was conquered by Austrians during Great Turkish War in 1687.

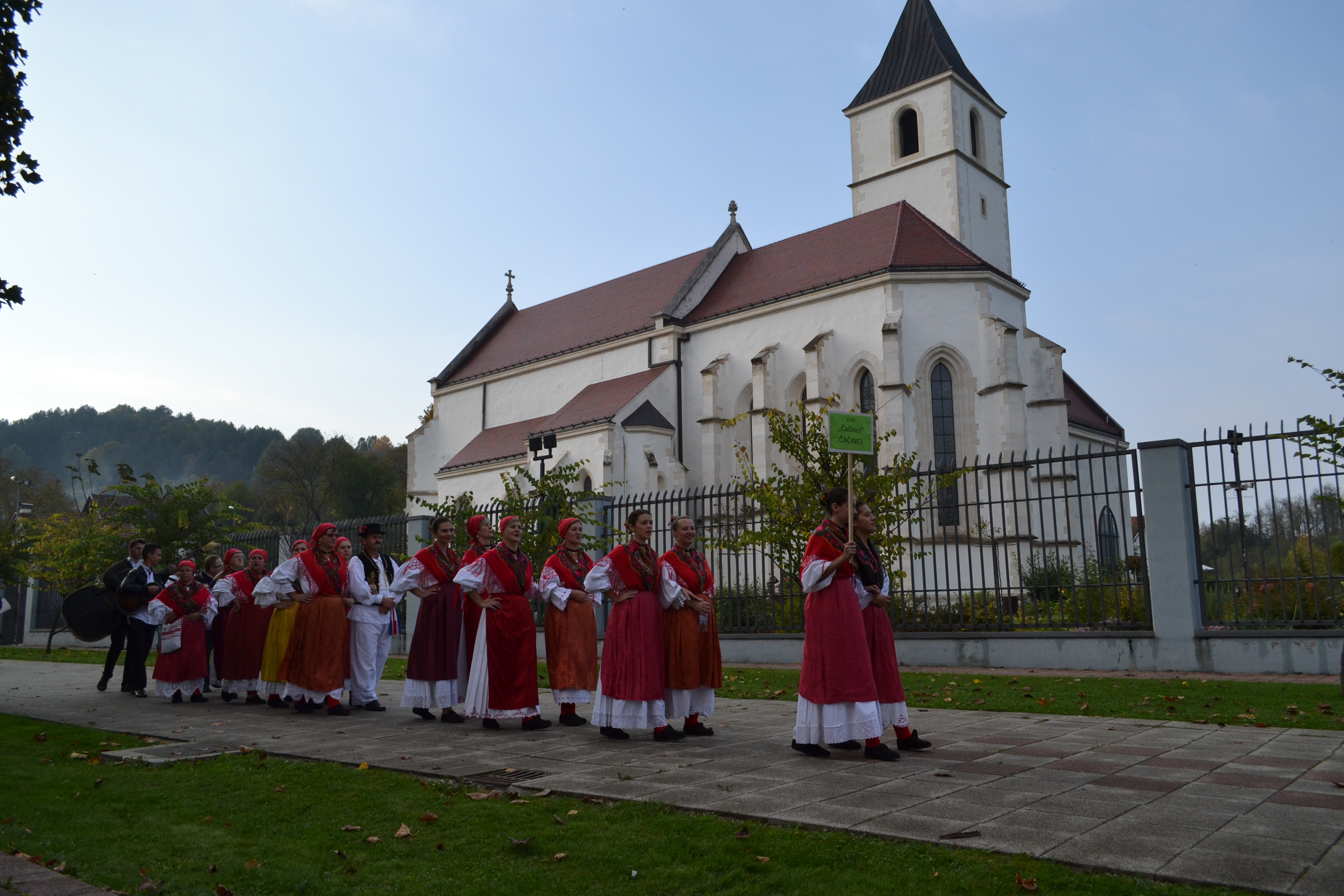
Cultural event "Voćinska kestenijada"

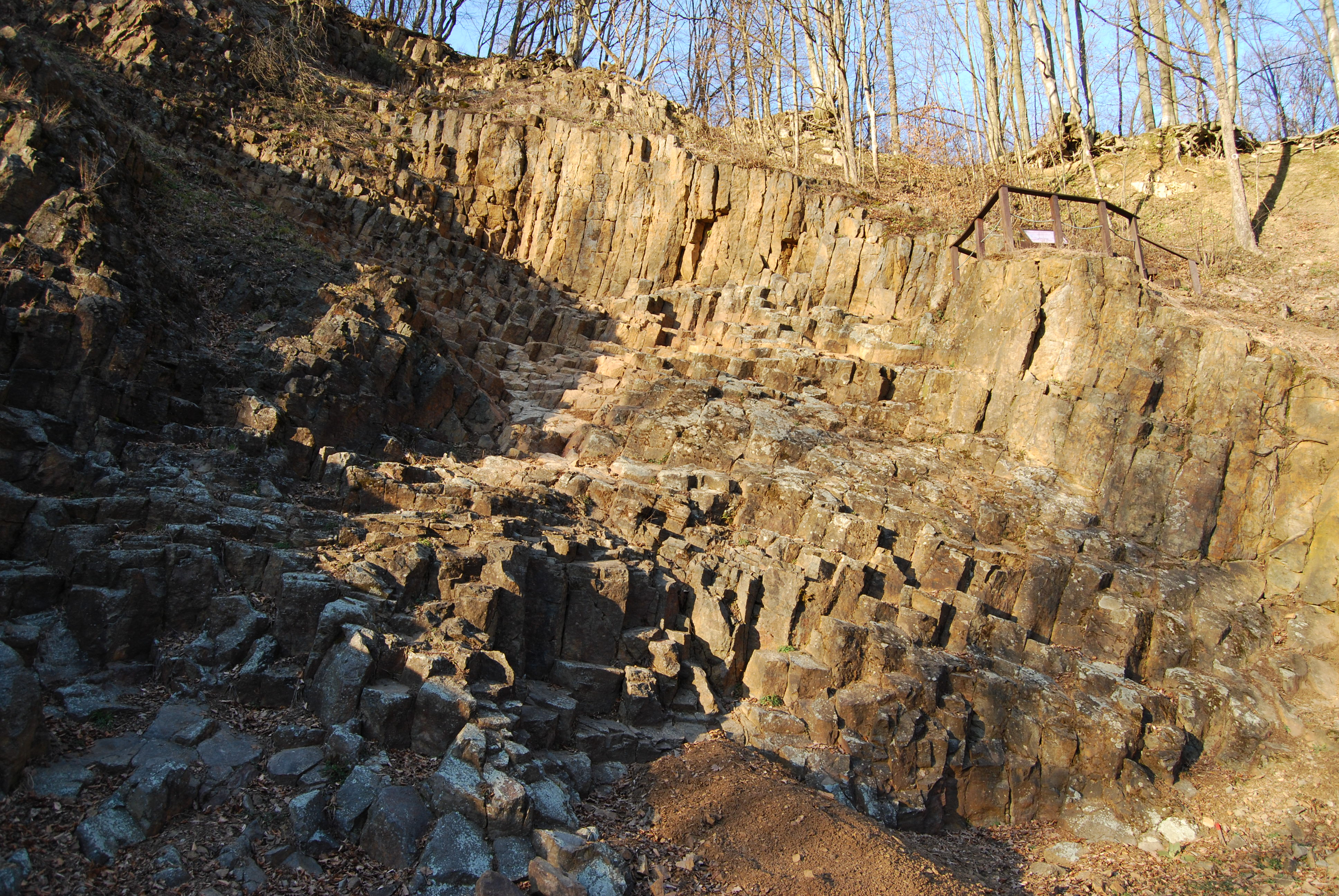
Columnar basalt at Rupica

In the late 19th and early 20th century, Voćin was part of the Virovitica County of the Kingdom of Croatia-Slavonia. The church was destroyed during World War II and rebuilt in 1973.

Colonist settlement of Hum was established on the territory of the municipality during the land reform in interwar Yugoslavia.

During the World War II, on January 14, 1942, happened the first Voćin massacre - killing of 350 Serb civilians by the Croatian Ustaše. The massacre was carried out as retaliation for partisans' action in Papuk.

During the Croatian War of Independence, the village's was the site of a massacre by the Serb White Eagles, who killed 43 villagers, all but one of whom were ethnic Croats. A Serb civilian who tried to protect his neighbors was the other fatality. Overnight, between 13 and 14 December 1991, the village's 550-year-old late style gothic church of the Visitation of the Blessed Virgin Mary was destroyed by explosive charges. Following the withdrawal of the Serb forces and arrival of Croatian forces, crimes against the Serb civilian population who stayed behind took place, with some 40 villagers killed over the course of several days.

== Demographics ==
According to the 2021 census, the Voćin municipality had 1,911 inhabitants. The municipality consists of the following settlements:

Settlement	1991	2001	2011	2021
Bokane	116	192	215	136
Ćeralije	284	597	623	595
Dobrić	64	4	-	-
Donje Kusonje	97	4	5	5
Đuričić	89	2	-	-
Gornje Kusonje	69	36	13	6
Gornji Meljani	172	12	15	8
Hum	243	102	90	62
Hum Varoš	61	40	47	24
Kometnik-Jorgići	119	58	26	27
Kometnik-Zubići	171	17	28	16
Kuzma	25	-	-	-
Lisičine	160	6	-	-
Macute	286	80	33	19
Mačkovac	75	73	47	33
Novo Kusonje	48	26	22	15
Popovac	43	2	-	-
Rijenci	120	7	5	3
Sekulinci	238	16	7	2
Smude	103	4	15	4
Voćin	1,569	1,221	1,191	956
Voćin municipality	4,152	2,421	2,384	1,911

Population of the Voćin municipality by ethnicity:

Year of census	total	Croats	Serbs	Yugoslavs	others
2021	1 896	1784 (94.09%)	90 (4.75%)	-	6 (0.3%)
2011	2 382	2 147 (90.13%)	211 (8.86%)	-	24 (1.01%)
2001	2 421	2 069 (85.46%)	315 (13.01%)	-	37 (1.53%)
1991	1 569	n/a	n/a	n/a	n/a

Population of the Voćin village by ethnicity:

Year of census	total	Croats	Serbs	Yugoslavs	others
2021	956	n/a	n/a	-	n/a
2011	1 191	1097 (92.12%)	79 (6.63%)	-	15 (1.26%)
2001	1 161	n/a	n/a	-	n/a
1991	1 569	426 (27.15%)	1 009 (64.31%)	65 (4.14%)	69 (4.40%)
1981	1 558	404 (25.93%)	904 (58.02%)	226 (14.51%)	24 (1.54%)
1971	1 489	541 (36.33%)	869 (58.36%)	61 (4.10%)	18 (1.21%)

Population change of Voćin village 1857–2021
v

population	1221	1359	1201	1483	1524	1884	1817	1980	1082	1460	1567	1489	1558	1569	1161	1191	956
	1857	1869	1880	1890	1900	1910	1921	1931	1948	1953	1961	1971	1981	1991	2001	2011	2021

Sources: Croatian Bureau of Statistics publications

== Politics ==
=== Minority councils ===
Directly elected minority councils and representatives are tasked with consulting tasks for the local or regional authorities in which they are advocating for minority rights and interests, integration into public life and participation in the management of local affairs. At the 2023 Croatian national minorities councils and representatives elections Serbs of Croatia fulfilled legal requirements to elect 10 members minority councils of the Municipality of Voćin.

== See also ==
- Voćin massacre
- Voćin massacre WW2 on 14 January 1942
- Church of the Visitation of the Blessed Virgin Mary, Voćin
- Rupnica
