= Voćin killings =

- Part of the Croatian War of Independence
- Location: 45.619861°N 17.547813°E; Voćin, Croatia and surrounding villages
- Date: 14-16 December 1991
- Target: Serbs
- Attack type: Summary executions, kidnappings
- Deaths: 24-40
- Perpetrator: Croatian Army (HV)
- Motive: Anti-Serb sentiment

The Voćin killings refers to the disappearances and murders of ethnic Serbs in Voćin, Croatia, and surrounding villages in December 1991 by the Croatian Army (HV) during the Croatian War of Independence.

== Background ==
Voćin is a village located at the bottom of the Papuk mountain, about 20 kilometers from (Podravska) Slatina, Western Slavonia.

By March 1991, tensions between Croats and Serbs escalated into the Croatian War of Independence. During the 1991 Yugoslav campaign in Croatia, the Yugoslav People's Army (JNA) was stopped from advancing through Western Slavonia by the Croatian National Guard (Zbor Narodne Garde – ZNG), although SAO Western Slavonia Territorial Defense Forces (Teritorijalna odbrana – TO) units took positions on the Bilogora and Papuk north of Pakrac, near Virovitica and Slatina.

The entry of Serb paramilitaries, including the White Eagles led to persecutions and crimes committed against the Croat population, incited by Vojislav Šešelj, who visited Voćin. Following military successes which recaptured territory, the HV advanced towards the village on 12 December 1991. The White Eagles were made to retreat, abandoning Voćin and while doing so were instructed to take no prisoners. On December 13, 1991, more than 40 villagers were killed, and the village was burned.

== Incidents ==
The HV captured Voćin on the night of 14–15 December, the village's Serb population having withdrawn the night before. Following the withdrawal of the Serb forces and arrival of Croatian forces, crimes against the Serb civilian population who stayed behind took place. Croatian soldiers torched many homes that belonged to the Serbs who had once inhabited the village.

Over the course of several days, many Serbs disappeared or were killed. Most of those killed were over the age of 60. The Serb National Council lists 24 names of Serbs who disappeared or were killed in Voćin and surrounding villages. The Serbian NGO Veritas lists a total of 40 Serb civilians who were killed. The Croatian NGO Documenta – Center for Dealing with the Past also lists a total of 40 names of Serb civilians who died on 12–13 December 1991. They note that the manner in which they were killed is not known, that the list is incomplete and that no one has been held accountable for the crimes committed against Serbs.
