= 1991 Voćin massacre =

1991 massacre of civilians in Voćin, Croatia

Voćin massacre
- Part of the Croatian War of Independence
- Voćin on the map of Croatia. Territories controlled by Serb or JNA forces in late December 1991 are highlighted in red.
- Location: 45.619861°N 17.547813°E; Voćin, Croatia
- Date: 13 December 1991
- Target: Mostly Croat civilians
- Attack type: Summary executions, ethnic cleansing
- Deaths: 43
- Perpetrator: White Eagles paramilitary unit
- Motive: Anti-Catholicism, anti-Croat sentiment, Greater Serbia, Serbianisation

The Voćin massacre was the killing of 43 civilians in Voćin, Croatia, by the Serbian White Eagles paramilitary unit on 13 December 1991, during the Croatian War of Independence. The massacre was carried out after the unit was ordered to abandon the village before the Croatian Army (Hrvatska vojska – HV) recaptured the area in Operation Papuk-91. All the victims were local Croats, except one Serb, who had tried to protect his neighbours. Gunfire was the leading cause of death, though some of the victims were killed with axes or chainsaws, or were burned to death. The victims exhibited signs of torture and were left unburied. On the night of 13–14 December, the White Eagles dynamited a 550-year-old church in the village.

The HV secured Voćin on the night of 14/15 December, the Serb population having left the previous night. Afterwards, Croatian soldiers torched many homes belonging to the Serbs who had once inhabited the village. The area was toured shortly afterwards by then-US Congressman Frank McCloskey, who publicised the killings at a news conference held in Zagreb the next day, calling them genocide. He persuaded American professor Dr. Jerry Blaskovich to take part in the investigation of the killings.

The International Criminal Tribunal for the former Yugoslavia (ICTY) later charged Slobodan Milošević with the killings and Vojislav Šešelj with the deportation of non-Serbs from Voćin. In 2015, the International Court of Justice ruled in the Croatia–Serbia genocide case that Croatia did not produce sufficient evidence to substantiate its claims about the events in Voćin.

== Background ==
Within the 1991 Yugoslav campaign in Croatia, the 5th (Banja Luka) Corps of the Yugoslav People's Army (Jugoslovenska Narodna Armija – JNA) was tasked with advancing north through western Slavonia, from Okučani to Daruvar and Virovitica, and with a secondary drive from Okučani towards Kutina. This task was essentially consistent with the line expected to be reached by the main thrust of the JNA advancing from eastern Slavonia in about a week. The linkup was designed to facilitate a further advance west to Zagreb and Varaždin.

The JNA was stopped by the Croatian National Guard (Zbor Narodne Garde – ZNG) between Novska, Nova Gradiška and Pakrac, although SAO Western Slavonia Territorial Defense Forces (Teritorijalna odbrana – TO) units took positions on the Bilogora and Papuk north of Pakrac, near Virovitica and Slatina with no JNA support. The TO was supported by Serbian paramilitaries deploying to the village of Voćin on the Papuk Mountain in October.

The paramilitaries were the White Eagles under the control of Vojislav Šešelj. He visited Voćin in the following month and incited the paramilitaries to persecute the Croat population. According to testimonies of surviving residents of Voćin, the White Eagles and several local Serbs terrorised the Croat population, reduced to 80 by late 1991. Prior to the war, ethnic Serbs formed eighty percent of the village's population.

On 29 October, the ZNG launched Operation Hurricane-91 against positions held by the JNA and the TO near Novska and Nova Gradiška, and Operation Swath-10 against the TO positions on the Bilogora Mountain south of Virovitica. Aiming to exploit the success of Operation Swath-10 and recapture Papuk area, Croatian forces, renamed the Croatian Army (Hrvatska vojska or HV) on 3 November, launched Operation Papuk-91 on 28 November.

== Killings ==
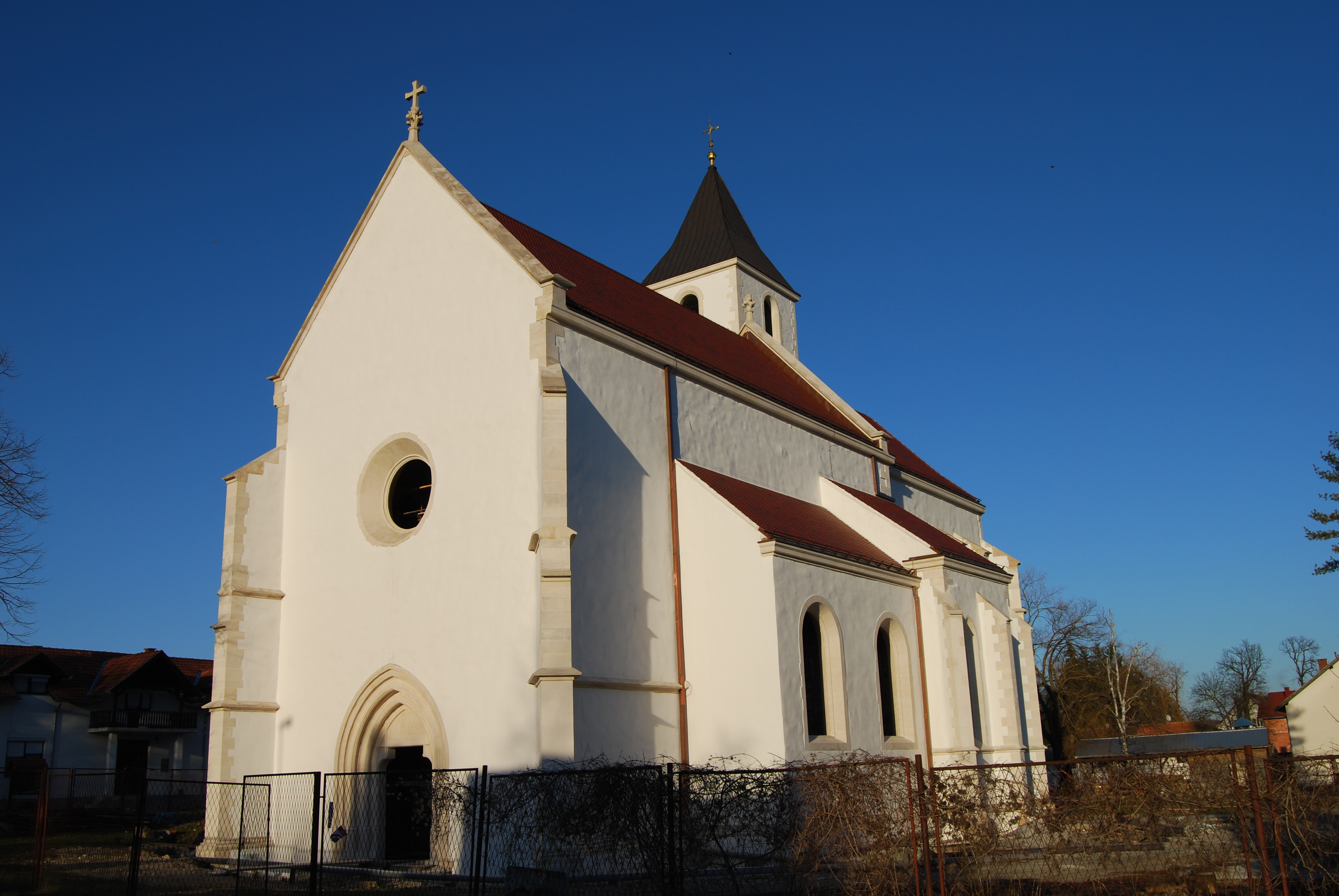
Church of the Pilgrimage to the Blessed Virgin Mary in Voćin, rebuilt after the war

The HV began advancing in the area of Đulovac, located approximately 5 kilometres (3.1 miles) west of Voćin, on 12 December, and the TO were forced to retreat from the area. In turn, the White Eagles were to abandon Voćin, but were ordered to take no prisoners. They were also instructed to ensure the evacuation of the Serb population. Those who refused to leave were threatened and one man was killed in front of his home.

The killing of civilians living in Voćin and two nearby smaller villages began on 13 December at noon. The White Eagles infantry, supported by at least one tank, moved through Voćin bombing Croat-owned houses and killing civilians. The killings and the destruction took twelve hours and claimed the lives of 43 civilians. The bodies of the victims were mutilated and left on display, presumably as a warning to others, outside Voćin itself, to flee or perish. All the victims were Croat civilians, except one 77-year-old Serb who had tried to protect his neighbours from the paramilitaries. Most of the victims were elderly, including twelve women aged 56–76 and eleven men aged 60–84.

Many of those killed were tortured, beaten using chains and burned. Most of the victims were killed by gunshots, but the cause of death proved hard to establish for eight victims whose bodies were severely burned. A couple was bound with chains and burned alive, two women were killed using axes or similar sharp objects, one of them by several axe blows to her head. Another couple was beheaded and their heads were placed in bags. The Serb civilian who attempted to protect the others was also beaten, tortured using lighted cigarettes and heated chains, and then flayed.

At 3:00 a.m., the paramilitaries demolished the Roman Catholic church of the Pilgrimage to the Blessed Virgin Mary in Voćin. They used the 550-year-old structure as an ammunition depot. In the wake of the explosion, a single wall of the structure remained standing. It is estimated that several tons of explosives were used for the purpose. At the same time, approximately 20 other Croat inhabitants of villages of Bokane, Krašković, Miokovićevo and Zvečevo, further to the south, were reportedly killed.

== Aftermath ==
The HV liberated Voćin on the night of 14/15 December, the village's Serb population having withdrawn the night before. Afterwards, Croatian soldiers torched many homes that belonged to the Serbs who had once inhabited the village. Following the withdrawal of the Serb forces and arrival of Croatian forces, crimes against the remaining Serb civilian population took place. According to the Croatian NGO Documenta – Center for Dealing with the Past, 40 Serb civilians were killed during the takeover.

One of the first to arrive in the village following its re-capture was McCloskey, in Croatia on a United Nations fact-finding mission. McCloskey asked an aide to arrange a press conference in Zagreb the next day, while the aide persuaded Dr. Jerry Blaskovich, an Associate Clinical Professor at the LAC+USC Medical Center (the Los Angeles County and University of Southern California hospital medical center), sent to Croatia to investigate alleged use of chemical weapons, to take part in the investigation of the killings of Croatian civilians. At the conference, McCloskey called the killings genocide. CNN reporter Mark Dalmish refused to attend the press conference as the network mistrusted reports of the killings, and reportedly only became interested in the event once Blaskovich's involvement was announced.

The victims' bodies were taken to the nearby town of Slatina for forensic examination on 17 December. Mackley contacted Croatian authorities and obtained permission to document the autopsies of the victims, but was denied access by authorities in Slatina. Mackley telephoned Croatian Defence Minister Gojko Šušak asking him to intervene on his behalf, but the local police allegedly disobeyed Šušak. The special police was deployed to Slatina to enforce Šušak's order to cooperate, almost causing an armed clash over the issue. To settle matters, a team was sent to Slatina by Zagreb University's Institute for Forensic Medicine to perform autopsies, retrieve bodies and perform the rest of the procedures in Zagreb.

Survivors who took shelter in basements or cornfields, as well as a captured member of the paramilitary forces, later testified about the killings and identified the White Eagles as the perpetrators. In addition, the withdrawing paramilitaries left critical evidence behind, including personnel records, which confirmed that the force had been White Eagles associated with Šešelj. An American war crimes investigator for the United Nations International Criminal Tribunal for the former Yugoslavia (ICTY), Special Agent John Cencich, corroborated the information in a 2002 interview with a high-level inside witness linking Slobodan Milošević, then president of Serbia to the killings. In 2001, the ICTY charged Milošević with the deaths of 32 civilians in Voćin. Milošević was subsequently arrested and tried, but he died before his trial was completed. In 2003, the ICTY also charged Šešelj with involvement in the forced deportation of non-Serb civilians from Voćin.

In March 2014, Croatia alleged before the International Court of Justice (ICJ) in the Croatia–Serbia genocide case that the massacre in Voćin was part of a larger campaign of genocide targeting the Croat population of Slavonia. In 2015, the ICJ ruled that although the material presented raises ground for grave suspicion about what occurred in Voćin, it is not sufficient to confirm that Croats were killed by Serb forces in that locality.

In 2016, the ICTY Trial Chamber acquitted Šešelj of all charges, a finding which was partially reversed in April 2018, when the Appeals Chamber at the IRMCT noted there was a widespread and systematic attack against the non-Serbian civilian population in Croatia, but dismissed the charges against Šešelj, other than those related to his role in the persecution of Croats in Serbia during the Yugoslav Wars.
