= Dobrić, Virovitica-Podravina County =

Dobrić
- Village
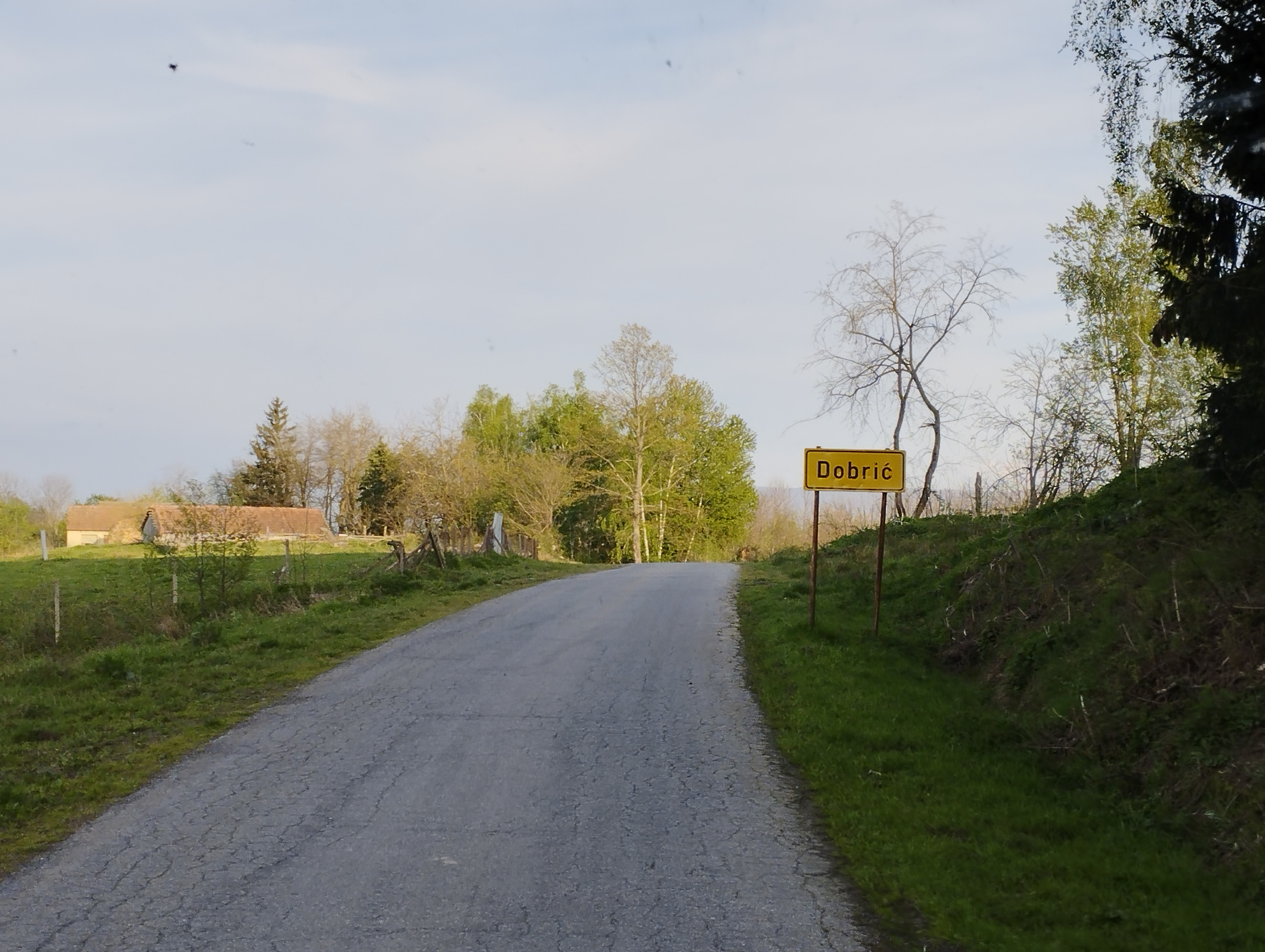

- Location of Dobrić in Croatia
- Coordinates: 45°35′N 17°35′E
- Country: Croatia
- Region: Continental Croatia
- County: Virovitica-Podravina County
- Municipality: Voćin

Area
  - Total: 4.5 km^{2} (1.7 sq mi)
- Elevation: 149 m (489 ft)

Population (2021)
  - Total: 0
  - Density: 0.0/km^{2} (0.0/sq mi)
- Time zone: UTC+1 (CET)
  - Summer (DST): UTC+2 (CEST)
- Postal code: 33522
- Area code: (+385) 33

Dobrić is an uninhabited settlement in Croatia, in the municipality of Voćin, Virovitica-Podravina County.

== Demographics ==
According to the 2011 census, the village of Dobrić has no inhabitants.

The 1991 census recorded that 96.88% of the village population were ethnic Serbs (62/64), 1.56% were Yugoslavs (1/64) and 1.56% were of other ethnic origin (1/64).

Historical population 1857-2011
v

population									130	134	127	112	84	64	4
	1857	1869	1880	1890	1900	1910	1921	1931	1948	1953	1961	1971	1981	1991	2001	2011

Sources: Croatian Bureau of Statistics publications
