= Bokane =

- Village
- Location of Bokane in Croatia
- Coordinates: 45°37′N 17°41′E
- Country: Croatia
- Region: Continental Croatia
- County: Virovitica-Podravina County
- Municipality: Voćin

Area
  - Total: 9.6 km^{2} (3.7 sq mi)
- Elevation: 153 m (502 ft)

Population (2021)
  - Total: 135
  - Density: 14/km^{2} (36/sq mi)
- Time zone: UTC+1 (CET)
  - Summer (DST): UTC+2 (CEST)
- Postal code: 33 522
- Area code: (+385) 33

Bokane is a village in Croatia, in the municipality of Voćin, Virovitica-Podravina County. It is connected by the D69 highway.

== Demographics ==
According to the 2011 census, the village of Bokane has 215 inhabitants. This represents 185.34% of its pre-war population according to the 1991 census.

The 1991 census recorded that 94.83% of the village population were ethnic Serbs (110/116), 2.59% were Yugoslavs (3/116), 1.72% were ethnic Croats (2/116), and 0.86% were of other ethnic origin (1/116).

From 1992 on, Janjevci Croats from Kosovo were settled in Bokane.

Historical population 1857–2011
v

population	270	377	327	443	522	452	499	575	176	208	194	183	168	116	192	215
	1857	1869	1880	1890	1900	1910	1921	1931	1948	1953	1961	1971	1981	1991	2001	2011

Sources: Croatian Bureau of Statistics publications
