= Madame Desperrières =

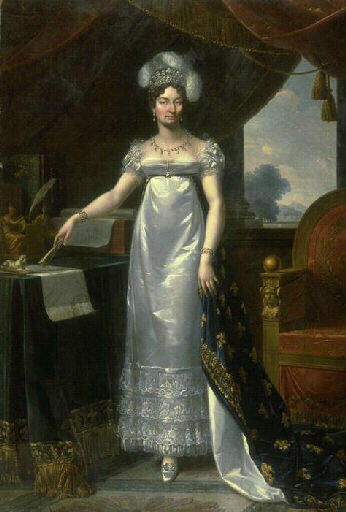
Des Périers' portrait of the Duchess of Angoulême

Jeanne-Rosalie-Émilie de Prinsac des Périers (1773–1860), known in error as Madame Desperrières, was a French portrait painter active during the Napoleonic Empire and the Bourbon Restoration. She exhibited at the Paris Salon from the early 1810s and is best known for her royalist portraits, including a state-commissioned portrait of Marie-Thérèse, Duchess of Angoulême and an official portrait of King Louis XVIII.

== Life ==
Jeanne-Rosalie-Émilie de Prinsac was born in Paris on 11 April 1773. She began her professional artistic career around 1812, maintaining a studio in Saint-Germain-des-Prés at 19 Cour du Commerce-Saint-André, a passageway earlier associated with Enlightenment and revolutionary activity. (Note: The Cour du Commerce was home to the café Le Procope, a meeting place for Enlightenment figures such as Voltaire and Diderot, as well as the workshop where Tobias Schmidt conducted early experiments on the guillotine.)

On 10 November 1790, de Prinsac married Edme-Louis-Dalmas des Périers, later Baron des Périers, a cavalry officer who was created a hereditary baron by letters patent on 30 May 1817. The couple had a son, André-Joseph-Hyacinthe, who served as an officer in the Paris gendarmerie.

Des Périers' name appears in historical sources with several variations, including Desperiers, Despériers, Desperrière, Desperrières and Desperières. (Note: The artist signed her own name Des Périers, the spelling also used on her marriage and death certificate. Other versions appear to be misspellings from Salon catalogues and an entry in Gabet's Dictionnaire des artistes de l'École française.) She died at Saint-Mandé on 30 March 1860.

== Legitimist Activity and Support for Louis XVII ==
Beyond her work as a portrait painter, Desperrières was actively involved in legitimist circles in Paris. She hosted gatherings of royalist supporters at her home, including high-ranking figures such as the marquis de Vibraye, the marquis de Goimpy, M. Bourbon-Leblanc, and M. Labreli de Fontaine. These networks coordinated efforts to promote the cause of Louis XVII and the Bourbon monarchy during and after the Napoleonic Empire.

A police report of the period notes Desperrières’ role in recruiting and organising loyalists, particularly among colleagues of her son at the Paris gendarmerie.

== Artistic career ==
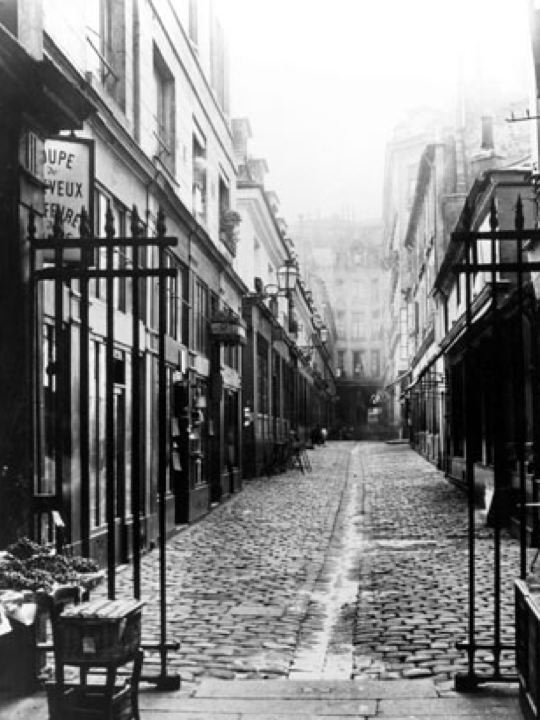
Cour du Commerce-Saint-André, where Des Périers had her studio

Desperrières was a frequent contributor to the Paris Salon from 1812. At her first recorded appearance she submitted a painting entitled Une jeune personne s’occupant de l’étude des Beaux-Arts (A young person studying the Fine-Arts) and a series of portraits. She submitted additional unnamed works in 1814 and 1817, again with a focus on portraiture.

Her final recorded Salon entries, in 1819, consisted of a number of portraits including a full-length portrait du Roi (Portrait of the King), and a portrait de S.A.R. Madame (Portrait of Madam Her Royal Highness). The latter of these was a full-length royal commission of the Duchess of Angoulême, delivered in 1818 and offered to the city of Bordeaux in 1823, where it reportedly stood in the Town Hall. The painting, measuring approximately 2.13 by 1.49 metres, depicts the princess in a white dress with jewels and a diamond tiara, seated before a red velvet throne embroidered with gold. Her hand rests on documents, including a map of Bordeaux dated 12 March 1814, marking the city's return to Bourbon control during the allied campaign that led to Napoleon's abdication and the subsequent restoration of the Bourbon monarchy.

In addition to her portraits of the Duchess of Angoulême, Desperrières' close professional connection to the Bourbon court is reflected in her subsequent portraits of Louis XVIII, Charles X, and the Duchess of Berry.
