= Portrait of the Duchess of Angoulême =

Painting by Antoine-Jean Gros

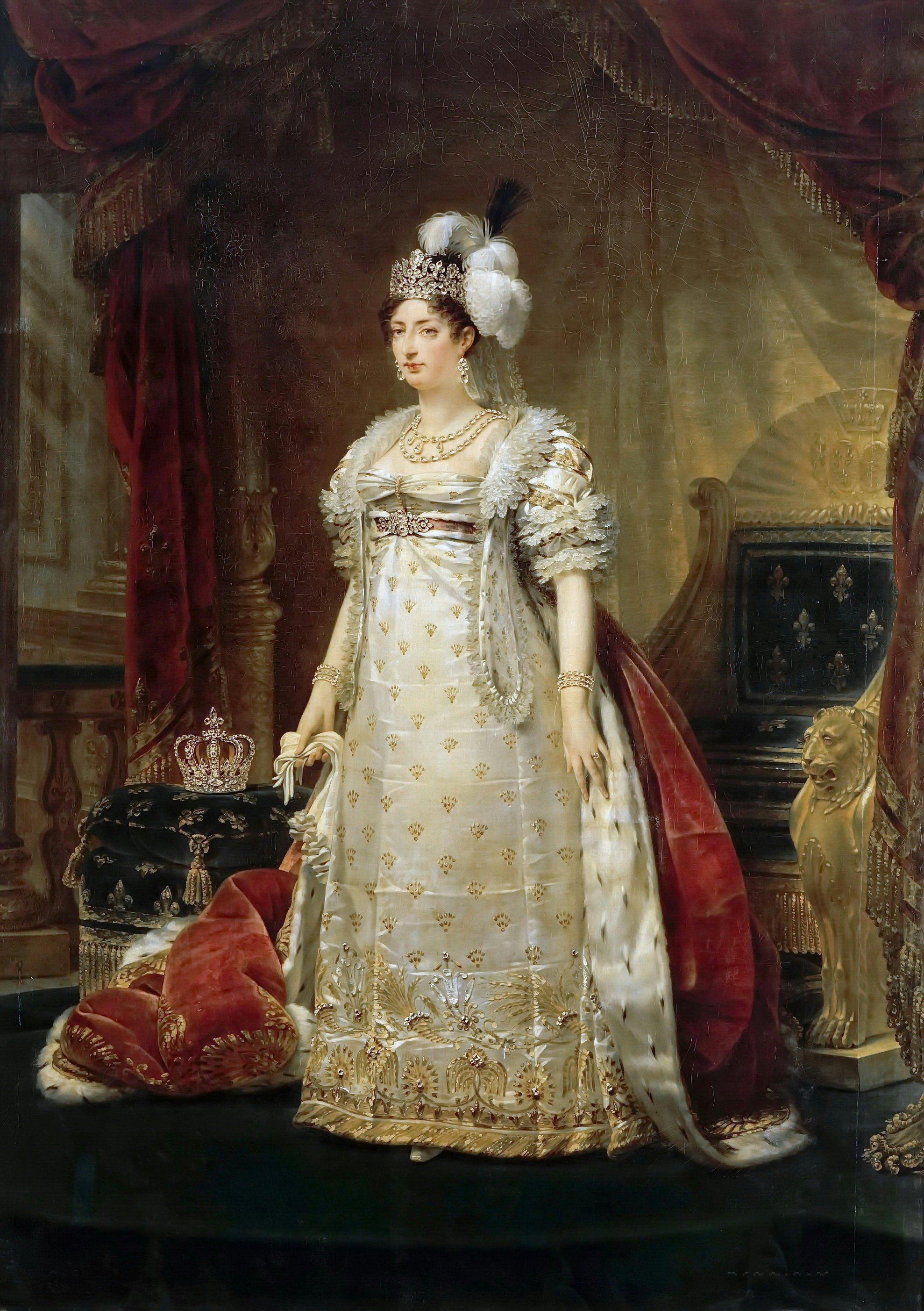
- Artist: Antoine-Jean Gros
- Year: 1816
- Type: Oil on canvas, portrait painting
- Dimensions: 257 cm × 182 cm (101 in × 72 in)
- Location: Palace of Versailles, Versailles

Portrait of the Duchess of Angoulême is an 1816 portrait painting by the French artist Antoine-Jean Gros depicting Marie Thérèse of France. The only surviving child of the guillotined Louis XVI she returned to France following the defeat of Napoleon. She was married to her first cousin the Duke of Angoulême, with the couple prominent at court during the Restoration era. As the wife of the heir to the throne she was likely to become Queen consort of France but the Bourbon dynasty were overthrown in the July Revolution of 1830.

The painting was commissioned by her uncle (and father-in-law) the future Charles X for the Chamber of Deputies. It was exhibited at the Salon of 1817 at the Louvre. Today it is in the collection of the Palace of Versailles. A study for the painting is now in the Bowes Museum. Two years later Gros again portrayed the Duchess in the history painting The Embarkation of the Duchess of Angoulême at Pauillac.

== See also ==
- Portrait of the Duke of Angoulême, 1825 portrait of her husband by the British artist Thomas Lawrence

== Bibliography ==
- Lebleu, Olivier. In the Footsteps of Zarafa, First Giraffe in France: A Chronicle of Giraffomania, 1826–1845. Rowman & Littlefield, 2020.
- Nagel, Susan. Marie-Therese, Child of Terror: The Fate of Marie Antoinette's Daughter. Bloomsbury Publishing, 2010.
