= Duchess of Angoulême =

Several women have borne the title of Duchess of Angoulême. Among these are:

- Joan II of Navarre, daughter of King Louis X of France, wife of Philippe d'Évreux, who was created Duke of Angoulême in 1317. Title exchanged 1404.
- Louise of Savoy, daughter of Philip II of Savoy, and mother of King Francis I of France, created Duchess of Angoulême in 1515.
- The title of Duchess of Angoulême was created for Diane de France, daughter (legitimated) of King Henry II of France. Title created in 1582, when Diane received the duchy of Angoulême in appanage, and became extinct upon her death in 1619.
- Charlotte de Montmorency, comtesse de Fleix, wife of Charles de Valois, natural son of King Charles IX of France. Title created in 1619 and extinct 1653.
- Marie Thérèse of France, daughter of King Louis XVI and his wife, Queen Marie Antoinette; later the wife of her first cousin, Louis Antoine, Duke of Angoulême (1775-1844), who arguably reigned twenty minutes as "King Louis XIX" in 1830. She is perhaps the best known Duchess of Angoulême. She was imprisoned during the French Revolution, and lived her later life in exile.

== See also ==
- Counts and Dukes of Angoulême
