= The Embarkation of the Duchess of Angoulême at Pauillac =

Painting by Antoine-Jean Gros

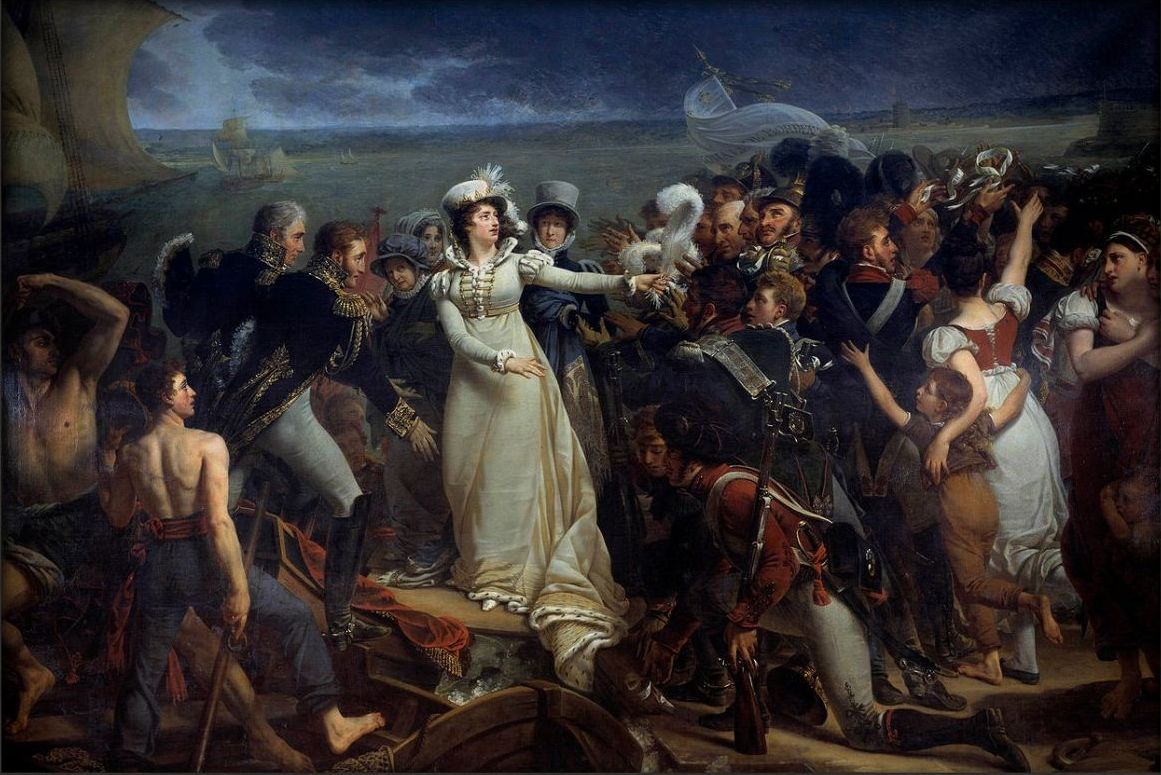
- Artist: Antoine-Jean Gros
- Year: 1818
- Type: Oil on canvas, history painting
- Dimensions: 326.5 cm × 504 cm (128.5 in × 198 in)
- Location: Musée des Beaux-Arts, Bordeaux

The Embarkation of the Duchess of Angoulême at Pauillac (French: Embarquement de la duchesse d'Angoulême à Pauillac) is an 1818 history painting by the French artist Antoine-Jean Gros. Gros had made his reputation depicting scenes of Napoleon Bonaparte and the French Empire. By contrast, this work was created under the Restoration era and celebrated an iconic royalist moment of recent history.

The painting shows a scene from April 1815. The main figure is Marie-Thérèse, Duchess of Angoulême, the only surviving child of Louis XVI and Marie Antoinette and the niece of the reigning monarch Louis XVIII. She was married to her cousin the Duke of Angoulême, then second-in-line to the throne. When Napoleon escaped from Elba and much of the royal family fled, the Duchess was in Bordeaux where she tried to rally royalist forces against his supporters. Having failed, she decided to leave to spare Bordeaux senseless destruction. She finally embarked from Pauillac and went into exile before Napoleon's final defeat at the Battle of Waterloo. Also depicted is the Ultra-royalist politician Mathieu de Montmorency.

It was exhibited at the Salon of 1819 in Paris and acquired by Louis XVIII in 1820. Today it is in the collection of the Musée des Beaux-Arts de Bordeaux in Bordeaux.

== See also ==
- Portrait of the Duchess of Angoulême, an 1816 portrait by Antoine-Jean Gros

== Bibliography ==
- Bann, Stephen. Paul Delaroche: History Painted. Reaktion Books, 1997.
- González-Palacios, Alvar. David and Napoleonic Painting. Fabbri, 1970.
- Nagel, Susan. Marie-Thérèse: The Fate of Marie Antoinette's Daughter. Bloomsbury, 2008.
