= Marie Thérèse of France =

French Madame Royale (1778–1851)

Marie-Thérèse
- Dauphine of France; Duchess of Angoulême; Madame Royale
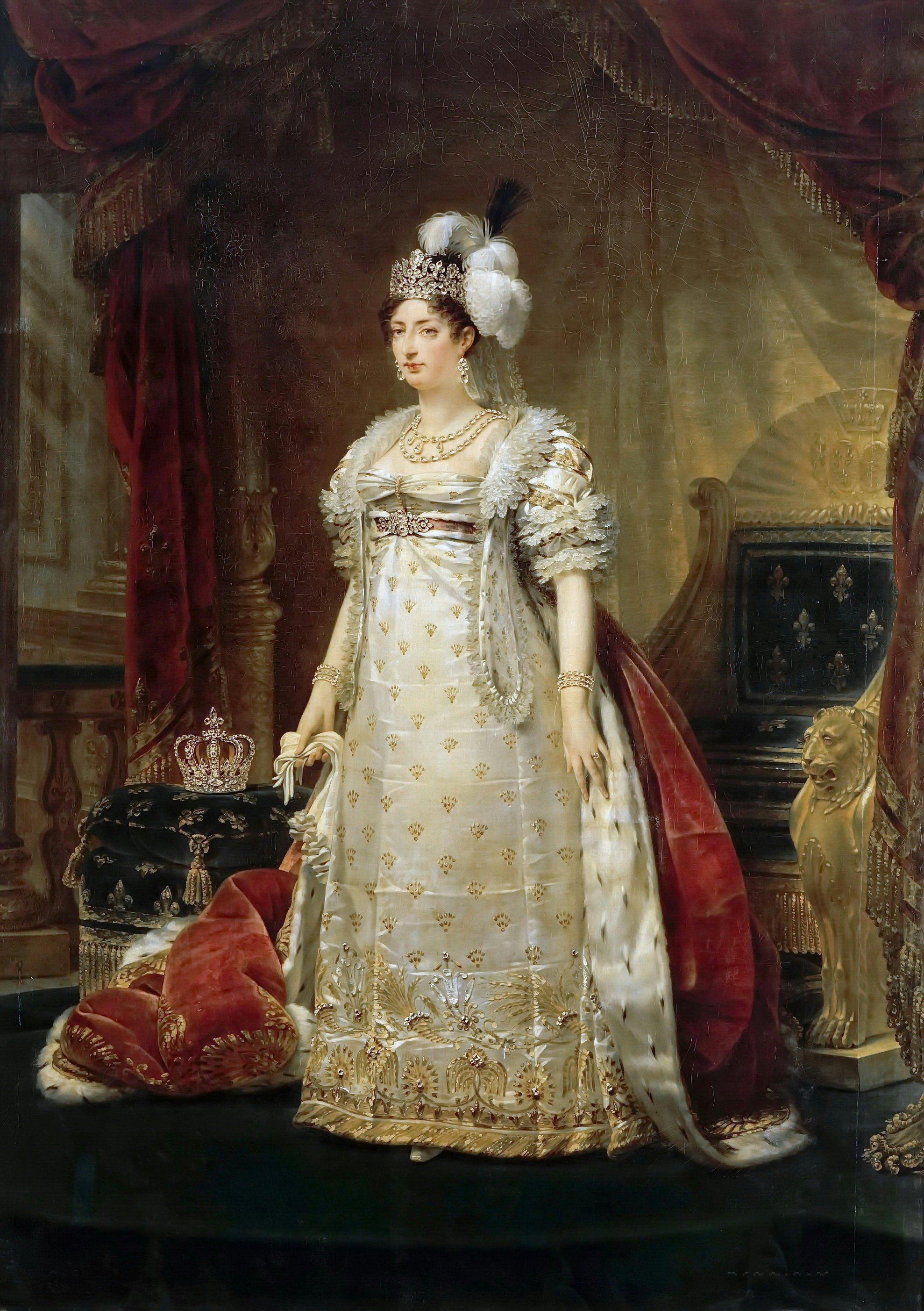
- Portrait of the Duchess of Angoulême by Antoine-Jean Gros, 1816

Queen consort of France (disputed)
- Tenure: 2 August 1830

Consort of the Legitimist pretender to the French throne
- Pretence: 6 November 1836 – 3 June 1844
- Born: 19 December 1778; Palace of Versailles, France
- Died: 19 October 1851 (aged 72); Frohsdorf Palace, Lanzenkirchen, Austrian Empire
- Burial: Kostanjevica Monastery, Nova Gorica, Slovenia
- Spouse: Louis Antoine, Duke of Angoulême (m. 1799; died 1844)
- Issue: stillborn child
Names
- Marie-Thérèse-Charlotte de France
- House: Bourbon
- Father: Louis XVI
- Mother: Marie Antoinette

Styles of Marie-Thérèse, Duchess of Angoulême
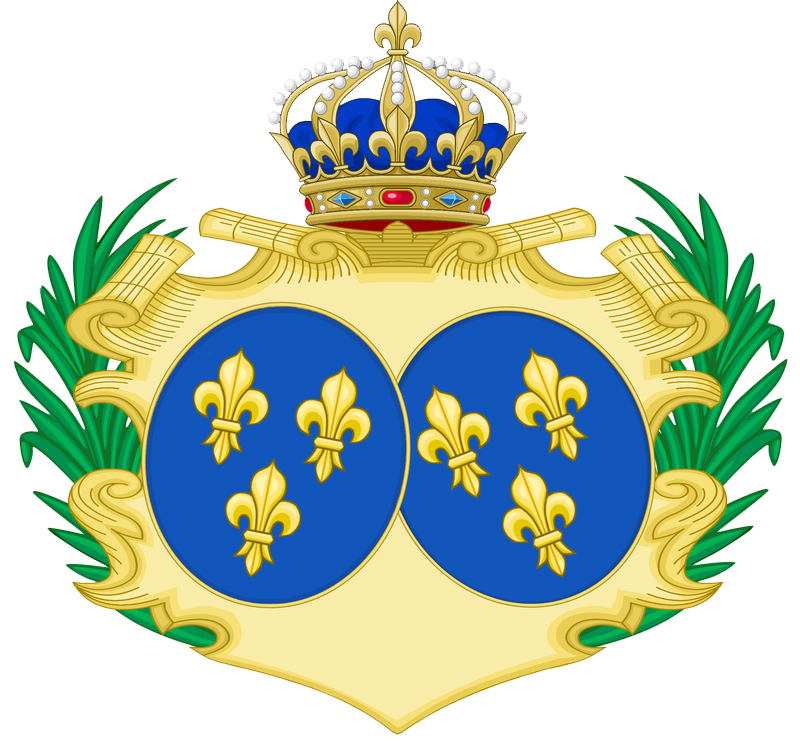
- Reference style: Her Royal Highness
- Spoken style: Your Royal Highness
- Alternative style: Most High, Most Potent and Excellent Princess

Marie-Thérèse (Marie-Thérèse Charlotte; 19 December 1778 – 19 October 1851) was the eldest child of King Louis XVI and Queen Marie Antoinette of France, and their only child to reach adulthood. In 1799, she married her cousin Louis Antoine, Duke of Angoulême, the eldest son of Charles X of France, henceforth becoming the Duchess of Angoulême. She was the only member of her immediate family to survive the French Revolution.

She became Dauphine of France upon the accession of her uncle and father-in-law, Charles X, to the French throne in 1824. On 2 August 1830, after the July Revolution, both Charles X and her husband signed an instrument of abdication 20 minutes apart. Some popular sources identify her to be a short-reigning Queen of France in the 20-minute interval between the signatures, but scholarly sources generally consider this to be a myth. She is, however, the undisputed legitimate Queen of France from 1836 to 1844 according to the Legitimists.

== Early life (1778–1789) ==
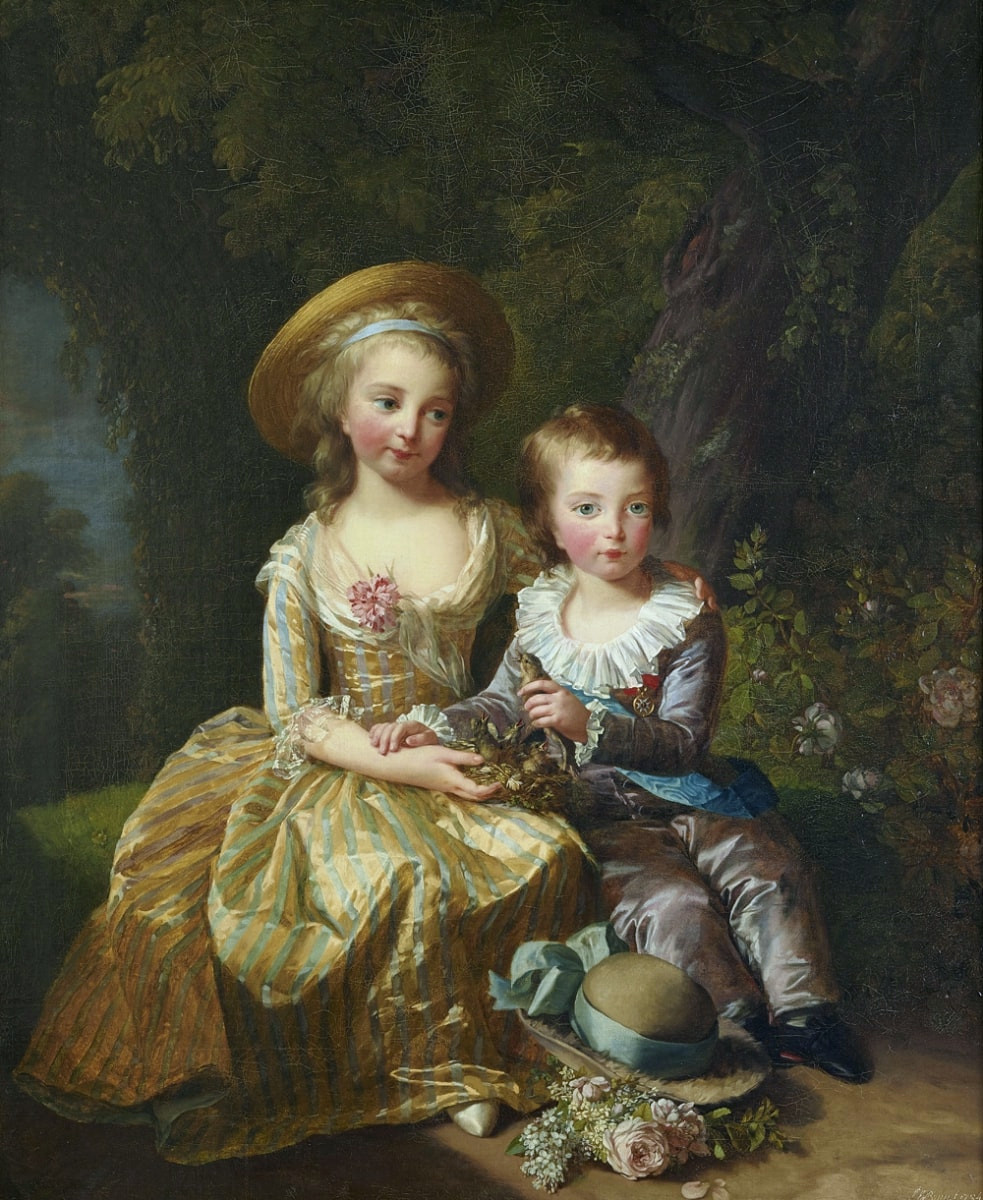
Marie-Thérése with her brother, Louis Joseph (by Élisabeth Vigée Le Brun, 1785)

Marie-Thérèse Charlotte was born at the Palace of Versailles on 19 December 1778, the first child (after eight years of her parents' marriage) and eldest daughter of King Louis XVI and Queen Marie Antoinette. As the daughter of the King of France, she was a fille de France, and as the eldest daughter of the King, she was styled Madame Royale at birth.

Marie Antoinette almost died of suffocation during the birth process due to a crowded and unventilated room, forcing men to break open the windows, which had been shut for the winter, in an attempt to revive her. As a result of this horrible experience, Louis XVI banned public viewing, allowing only close family members and a handful of trusted courtiers to witness the birth of the next royal children. When she was revived, the Queen greeted her daughter (whom she later nicknamed Mousseline la sérieuse) with delight:

Poor little girl, you are not what was desired, but you are no less dear to me on that account. A son would have been the property of the state. You shall be mine; you shall have my undivided care; you will share all my happinesses and you will alleviate my sufferings . . ..

Marie-Thérèse was baptised on the day of her birth. She was named after her maternal grandmother, the Empress Maria Theresa. Her second name, Charlotte, was for her mother's favourite sister, Maria Carolina of Austria, Queen consort of Naples and Sicily, who was known as Charlotte in the family.

Marie-Thérèse's household was headed by her governess, Princess Victoire de Rohan-Guéméné, who later had to resign due to her husband's bankruptcy and was replaced by one of the Queen's closest friends, Yolande de Polastron, Duchess of Polignac. The actual care was, however, given by the sub-governesses, notably Baroness Marie Angélique de Mackau. Louis XVI was an affectionate father, who delighted in spoiling his daughter, while her mother was stricter.

Marie Antoinette was determined that her daughter should not grow up to be as haughty as her husband's unmarried aunts. She often invited children of lower rank to come and dine with Marie-Thérèse and, according to some accounts, encouraged the child to give her toys to the poor. In contrast to her image as a materialistic Queen who ignored the plight of the poor, Marie Antoinette attempted to teach her daughter about the sufferings of others. One account, written by a partisan source some years after her death, says that on New Year's Day in 1784, after having some beautiful toys brought to Marie-Thérèse's apartment, Marie Antoinette told her:

I should have liked to have given you all these as New Year's gifts, but the winter is very hard, there is a crowd of unhappy people who have no bread to eat, no clothes to wear, no wood to make a fire. I have given them all my money; I have none left to buy you presents, so there will be none this year.

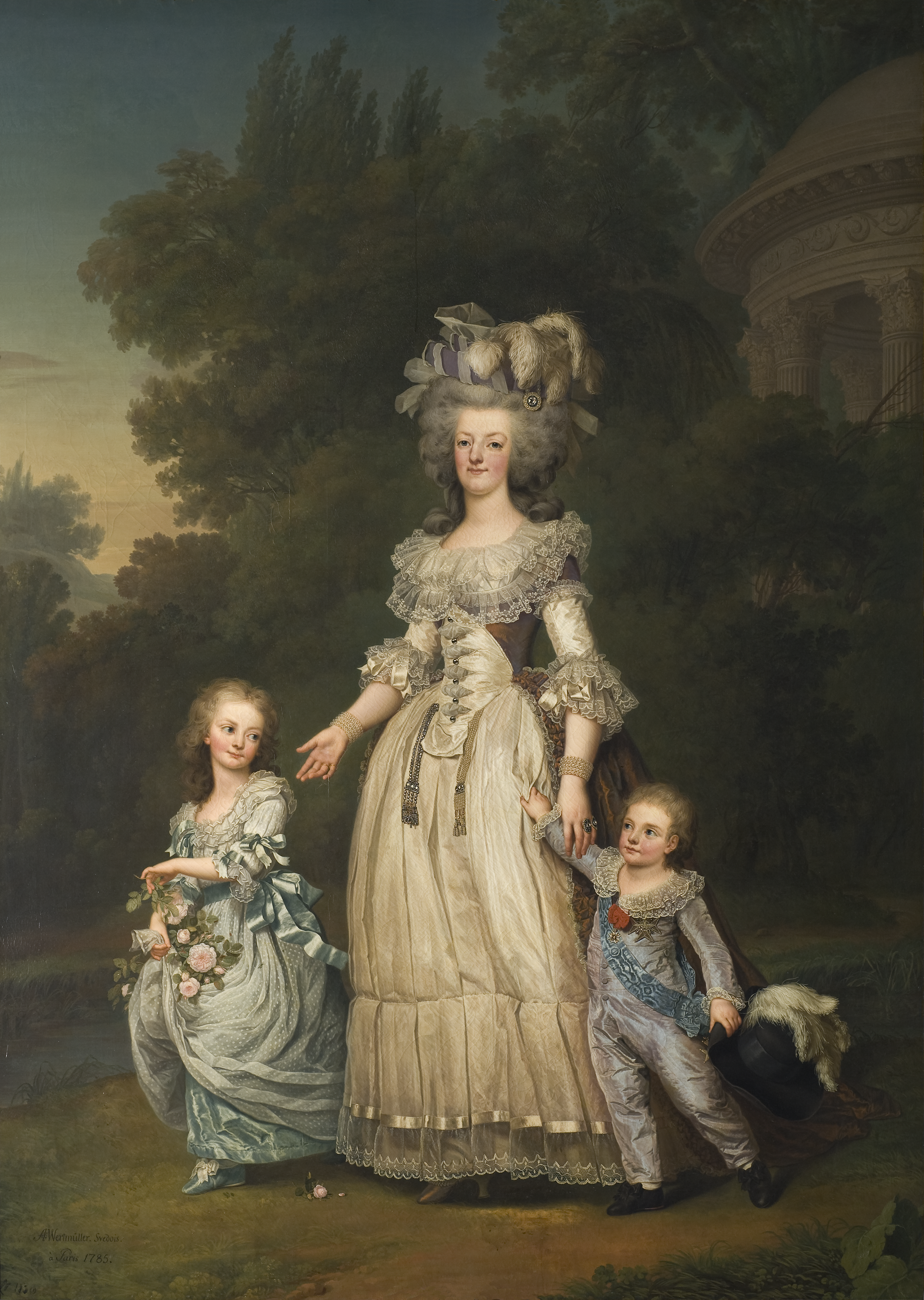
Marie-Thérèse Charlotte with her mother, Marie Antoinette, and her brother Louis Joseph, Dauphin of France, in the gardens of the Petit Trianon (by Adolf Ulrik Wertmüller, 1785)

Marie-Thérèse was joined by two brothers and a sister, Louis Joseph Xavier François, Dauphin of France, in 1781, Louis Charles, Duke of Normandy, in 1785, and Sophie Hélène Béatrix, Madame Sophie, in 1786. Out of all her siblings, she was closest to Louis Joseph, and after his death, Louis Charles. As a young girl, Marie-Thérèse was noted to be quite attractive, with beautiful blue eyes, inheriting the good looks of her mother and maternal grandmother. She was the only one of her parents' four children to survive past age 10.

== Life during the Revolution (1789–1795) ==
As Marie-Thérèse matured, the march toward the French Revolution was gaining momentum. Social discontent mixed with a crippling budget deficit provoked an outburst of anti-absolutist sentiment. By 1789, France was hurtling toward revolution as the result of bankruptcy brought on by the country's support of the American Revolution and high food prices due to drought, all of which was exacerbated by propagandists whose central object of scorn and ridicule was the Queen of France, Marie Antoinette.

As the attacks upon the Queen grew ever more vicious, the popularity of the monarchy plummeted. Inside the court at Versailles, jealousies and xenophobia were the principal causes of resentment and anger toward Marie Antoinette. Her unpopularity with certain powerful members of the court, including the Duke of Orléans, led to the printing and distribution of scurrilous pamphlets, known as libelles, which accused her of a range of sexual depravities, spending the country into financial ruin, and other ridiculous misinformation. While it is now generally agreed that the Queen's actions did little to provoke such animosity, the damage these pamphlets inflicted upon the monarchy proved to be a catalyst for the upheaval to come. These pamphlets would culminate in the sham trial of the Queen in 1793.

The worsening political situation, however, had little effect on Marie-Thérèse. More immediate tragedy struck when her younger sister, Sophie, died in 1787. This was followed two years later by the Dauphin, Louis Joseph, who died of tuberculosis on 4 June 1789, in the middle of the chaos of the Estates General.

=== Forced move to the Tuileries Palace in Paris ===
When the Bastille was stormed by an armed mob on 14 July 1789, the situation reached a climax. The life of the 10-year-old Madame Royale began to be affected as several members of the royal household were sent abroad for their own safety. The Count of Artois, her uncle, and the Duchess of Polignac, governess of the royal children, left the kingdom on the orders of Louis XVI.

The Duchess of Polignac was replaced by Louise Élisabeth de Croÿ, Marquise de Tourzel, whose daughter Pauline became a lifelong friend of Marie-Thérèse.

On 5 October, an armed mob from Paris marched on Versailles, intent on 'acquiring food believed to be stored there', and to advance political demands. After the invasion of the palace in the early hours of 6 October, on which the Queen was almost murdered in her bed and which had forced the royal family to take refuge in the King's apartment, the crowd demanded and obtained the move of the King and his family to the Tuileries Palace in Paris.

As the political situation deteriorated, Louis XVI and Marie Antoinette realized that their lives were in danger, and went along with the plan of escape organised with the help of Axel von Fersen. The plan was for the royal family to flee to the northeastern fortress of Montmédy, a royalist stronghold, but the attempted flight was intercepted in Varennes, and the family was arrested and escorted back to Paris.

=== Imprisonment in the Temple ===
On 10 August 1792, after the royal family had taken refuge in the Legislative Assembly, Louis XVI was deposed, although the monarchy was not abolished until 21 September. On 13 August the entire royal family was imprisoned in the Temple Tower, remains of a former medieval fortress. On 21 January 1793, Louis XVI was executed on the guillotine, at which time Marie-Thérèse's young brother Louis Charles was recognised as King Louis XVII of France by the royalists.

In March 1793 General Charles François Dumouriez came up with the idea to restore the monarchy and free Marie Antoinette and her children. His ally, the 20-year-old Duke of Chartres, intended to marry Marie-Thérèse. When they failed in getting support from the troops, the men went toward the Austrian camp and lived in exile.

Three months later, in the evening of 3 July 1793, guards entered the royal family's chambers, forcibly took away the eight-year-old Louis Charles, and entrusted him to the care of the abusive Antoine Simon, a cobbler and Temple commissioner. Remaining in their chambers in the Tower were Marie Antoinette, Marie-Thérèse and Madame Élisabeth, Louis XVI's youngest sister. When Marie Antoinette was taken to the Conciergerie one month later, in the night of 2 August, Marie-Thérèse was left in the care of her aunt Élisabeth who, in turn, was taken away on 9 May 1794 and executed the following day. Of the royal prisoners in the Temple, Marie-Thérèse Charlotte was the only one to survive the Reign of Terror.

Her stay in the Temple Tower was one of solitude and often great boredom. The two books she had, the famous prayer book by the name of The Imitation of Christ and Voyages by Jean-François de La Harpe, were read over and over, so much so that she grew tired of them. But her appeal for more books was denied by government officials, and many other requests were frequently refused, while she often had to endure listening to her brother's cries and screams whenever he was beaten. On 11 May, Maximilien Robespierre visited Marie-Thérèse, but there is no record of the conversation. During her imprisonment, Marie-Thérèse was never told what had happened to her family. All she knew was that her father was dead. The following words were scratched on the wall of her room in the tower:

Marie-Thérèse Charlotte is the most unhappy person in the world. She can obtain no news of her mother; nor be reunited to her, though she has asked it a thousand times. Live, my good mother! whom I love well, but of whom I can hear no tidings. O my father! watch over me from Heaven above. O my God! forgive those who have made my parents suffer.

Marie-Thérèse-Charlotte est la plus malheureuse personne du monde. Elle ne peut obtenir de savoir des nouvelles de sa mère, pas même d'être réunie à elle quoiqu'elle l'ait demandé mille fois. Vive ma bonne mère que j'aime bien et dont je ne peux savoir des nouvelles. Ô mon père, veillez sur moi du haut du Ciel. Ô mon Dieu, pardonnez à ceux qui ont fait souffrir mes parents.

In late August 1795 Marie-Thérèse was finally told what had happened to her family. When she had been informed of each of their fates, the distraught Marie-Thérèse began to cry, letting out loud sobs of anguish and grief.

It was only once the Terror was over that Marie-Thérèse was allowed to leave France. She was liberated on 18 December 1795, on the eve of her seventeenth birthday, exchanged for prominent French prisoners (Pierre Riel de Beurnonville, Jean-Baptiste Drouet, Hugues-Bernard Maret, Armand-Gaston Camus, Nicolas Marie Quinette, and Charles-Louis Huguet de Sémonville) and taken to Vienna, the capital city of her cousin, the Holy Roman Emperor Francis II, and also her mother's birthplace.

== Exile (1795–1814) ==
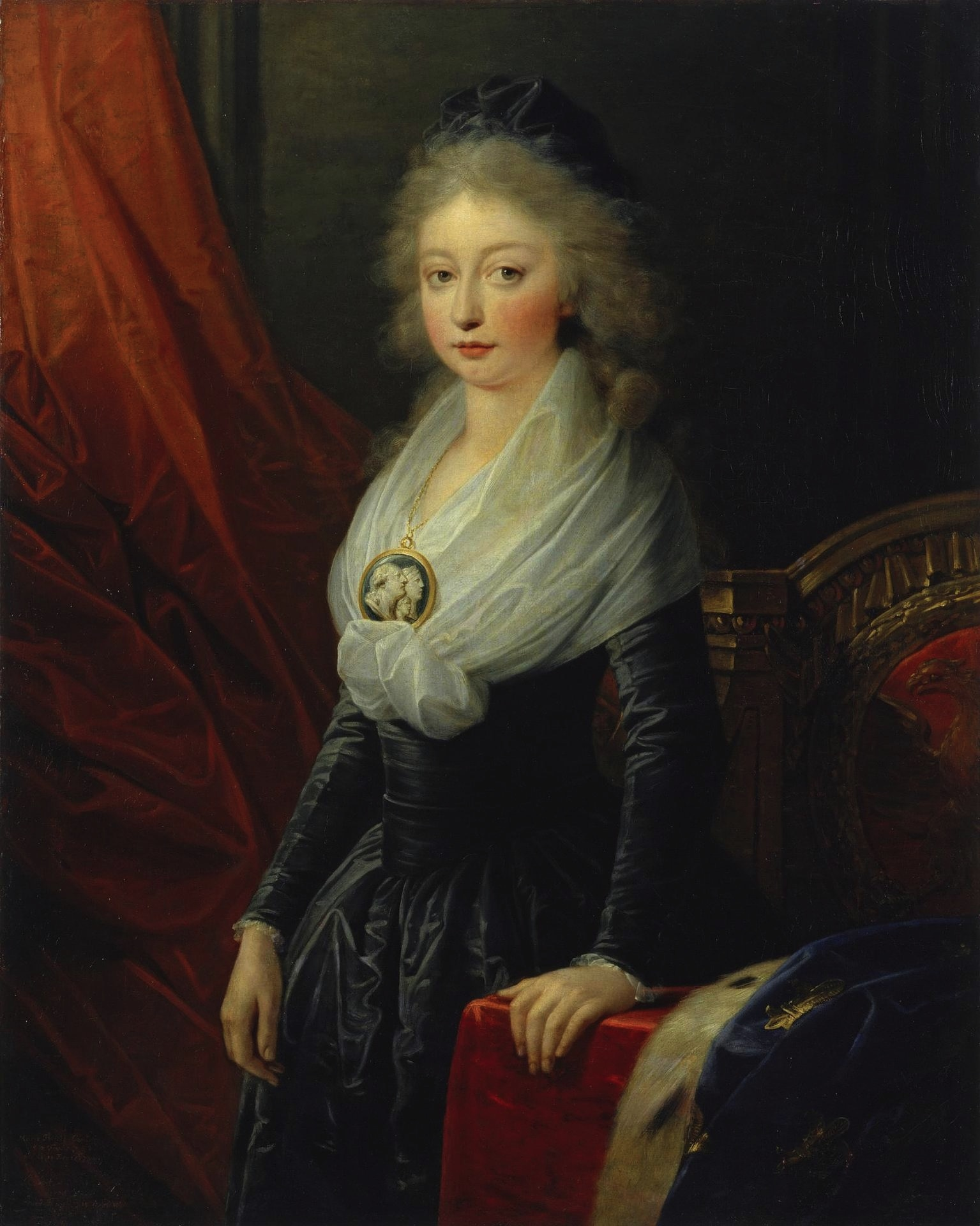
Marie-Thérèse in Vienna in 1796 soon after her departure from France (by Heinrich Friedrich Füger)

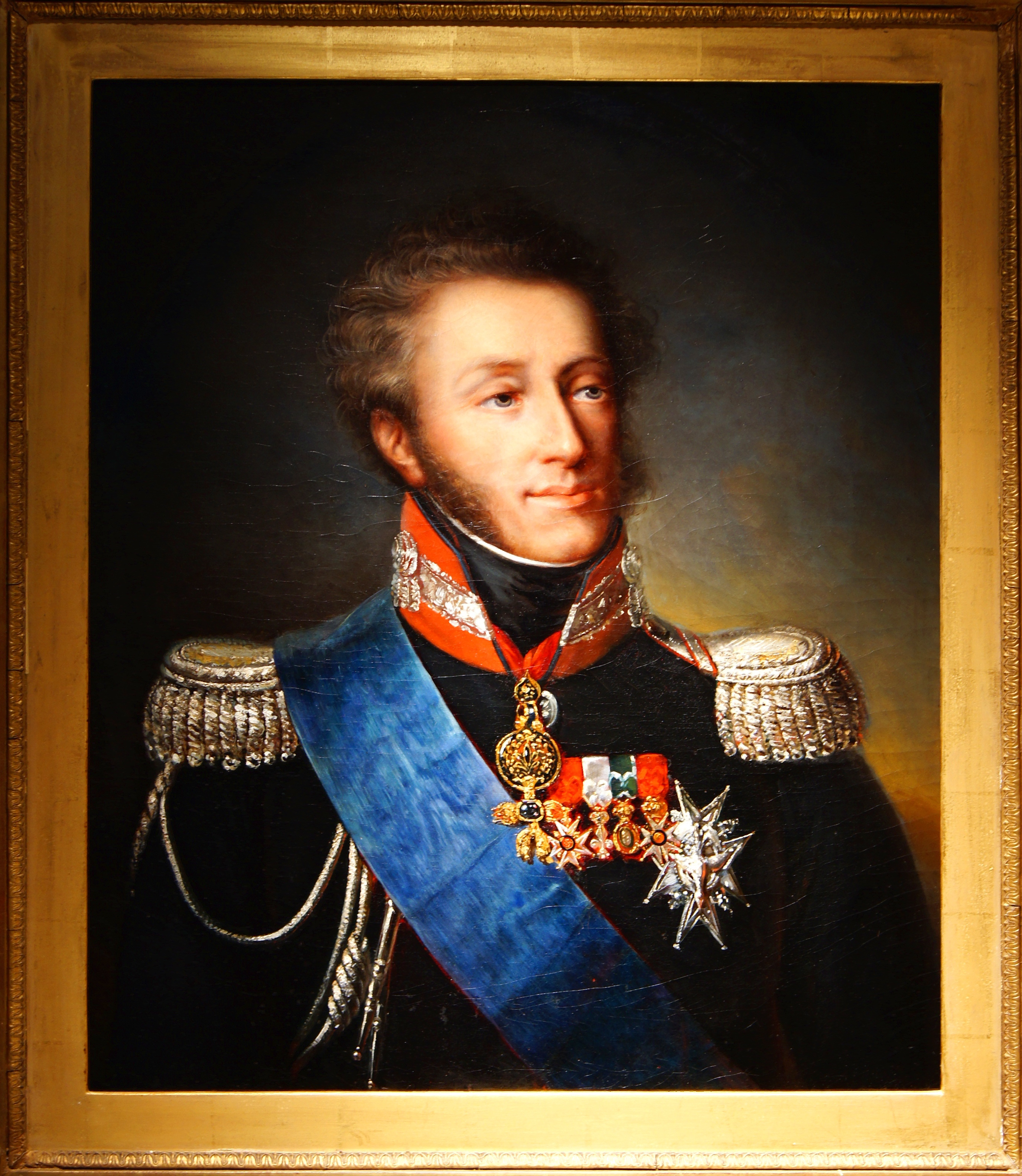
Louis Antoine, Duke of Angoulême (collection Musée de la Légion d'honneur)

Marie-Thérèse arrived in Vienna on 9 January 1796, in the evening, 22 days after she had left the Temple.

She later moved to Mitau, Courland (now Jelgava, Latvia), where her father's eldest surviving brother, the Count of Provence, lived as a guest of Tsar Paul I of Russia. He was the legitimate King of France as Louis XVIII after the death of Marie-Thérèse's brother. With no children of his own, he wished his niece to marry her cousin, Louis-Antoine, Duke of Angoulême, son of his brother, the Count of Artois. Marie-Thérèse agreed.

Louis-Antoine was a shy, stammering young man. His father tried to persuade Louis XVIII against the marriage. However, the wedding took place on 10 June 1799 at Jelgava Palace.

=== Life in Britain ===
The royal family moved to Great Britain, where they settled at Hartwell House, Buckinghamshire, while her father-in-law spent most of his time in Edinburgh, where he had been given apartments at Holyrood Palace.

The couple did not consummate their marriage until mid-1812, according to their doctor's reports, noted by author and historian Susan Nagel. Marie-Therese, according to British newspapers, was severely ill the week of October 31-November 5, 1812 but had recovered in early November. On December 19, 1812, her thirty-fourth birthday, she discovered she was pregnant and bursting with happiness. She may have experienced nausea from morning sickness in the month prior. In January, Princess Charlotte of Wales noticed that the Duchess was in high spirits, while Monsieur Lefebvre, Marie-Therese's doctor, wrote to Francois Hue, "At this moment, I am tending to a woman who lives above me and who is pregnant for the first time after more than thirteen years of marriage." Three days later, Francois Hue wrote to his wife that the Duke of Angoulême would become a father in June. Madame Hue wrote down, "Monsieur Hue and Monsieur Lefebvre designate Madame the Duchess of Angoulême, announcing her pregnancy." On February 15, Louise de Conde wrote to her father about her shock concerning the pregnancy. At least a week and a half earlier, British newspapers recorded that Marie-Therese was severely indisposed and was advised by her doctors to "not attend the drawing room on Thursday."

Sometime between February 15 and June 1813, Marie-Therese lost the child, most likely at Hartwell House, and went to Bath with her uncle to recover, likely after her labor with a stillborn child, on July 15 and August 7 of 1813, while residing at 70-71 or 72 Great Pulteney Street with her uncle later in October. Susan Nagel referred to the event as a "miscarriage", when Francois Hue's letter mentioned the due date in June. This would mean that Marie-Therese's pregnancy in February was already past five months gestation, and almost certainly advanced enough to constitute a stillbirth. Allegedly, in mid-May, according to British newspapers, “The Duke D'Angouleme, Baron De Rolli, and the Duke D'Artois, left London yesterday for the Continent. Prague is said to be their destination, where, according to report, a Congress of Princes is to be held.” The newspapers also referenced Louis-Antoine attending another ball at Carlton House without Marie-Therese or any other family members days prior, when only two major balls took place on February 5 and June 30, making the ball and Congress of Princes false or incomplete rumors.

The long years of exile ended with the abdication of Napoleon Bonaparte in 1814 and the first Bourbon Restoration, when Louis XVIII was restored to the throne of France, 21 years after the death of his brother Louis XVI.

== Bourbon Restoration (1814–1830) ==
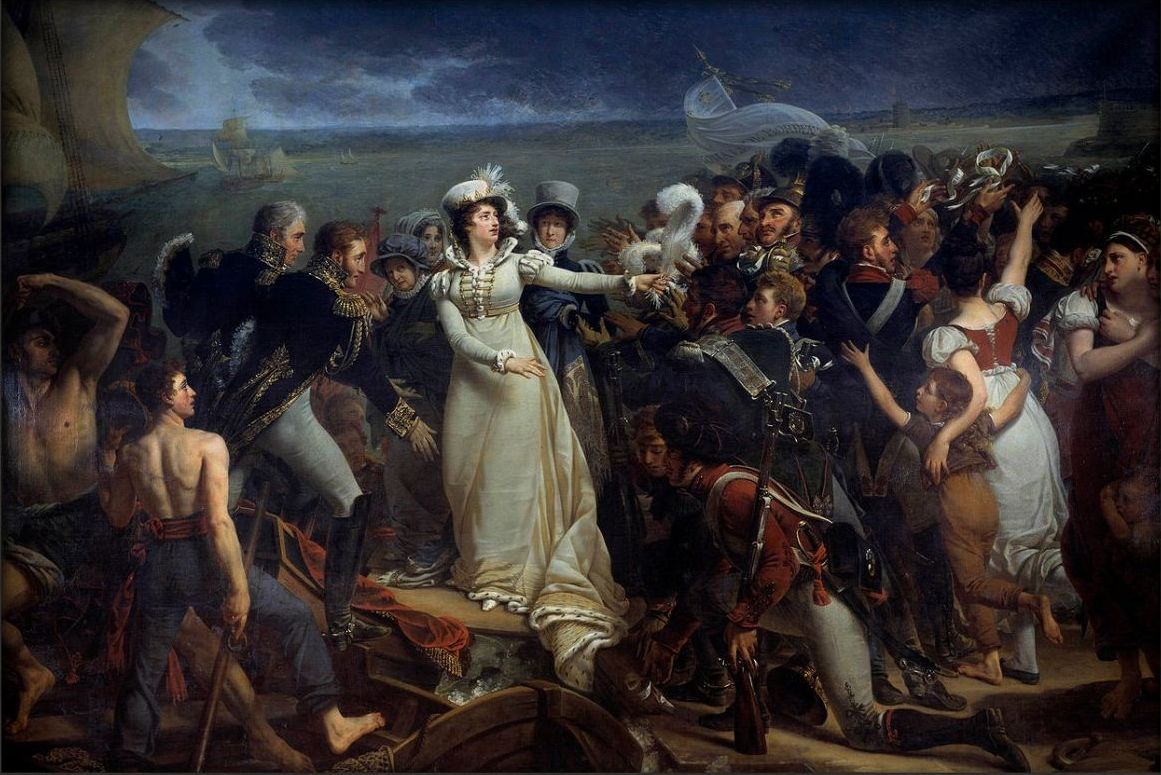
The Embarkation of the Duchess of Angoulême at Pauillac by Antoine-Jean Gros, 1818

Louis XVIII attempted to steer a middle course between liberals and the Ultra-royalists led by the Count of Artois. He also attempted to suppress the many men who claimed to be Marie-Thérèse's long-lost younger brother, Louis XVII. Those claimants caused the princess a great deal of distress.

Marie-Thérèse found her return emotionally draining and she was distrustful of the many Frenchmen who had supported either the Republic or Empire. She visited the site where her brother had died and the Madeleine Cemetery where her parents were buried. The royal remains were exhumed on 18 January 1815 and re-interred in the Basilica of Saint-Denis, the royal necropolis of France, on 21 January 1815, the 22nd anniversary of Louis XVI's death.

In March 1815 Napoleon returned to France and rapidly began to gain supporters, raising an army in the period known as the Hundred Days. Louis XVIII fled France, but Marie-Thérèse, who was in Bordeaux at the time, attempted to rally the local troops. The troops agreed to defend her but not to cause a civil war with Napoleon’s troops. Marie-Thérèse stayed in Bordeaux despite Napoleon’s orders for her to be arrested. When his army arrived General Clauzel forced the point. Believing her cause was lost, and to spare Bordeaux senseless destruction, she finally agreed to leave. Her actions caused Napoleon to remark that she was 'the only man in her family.'

After Napoleon was defeated at Waterloo on 18 June 1815, the House of Bourbon was restored for a second time, and Louis XVIII returned to France.

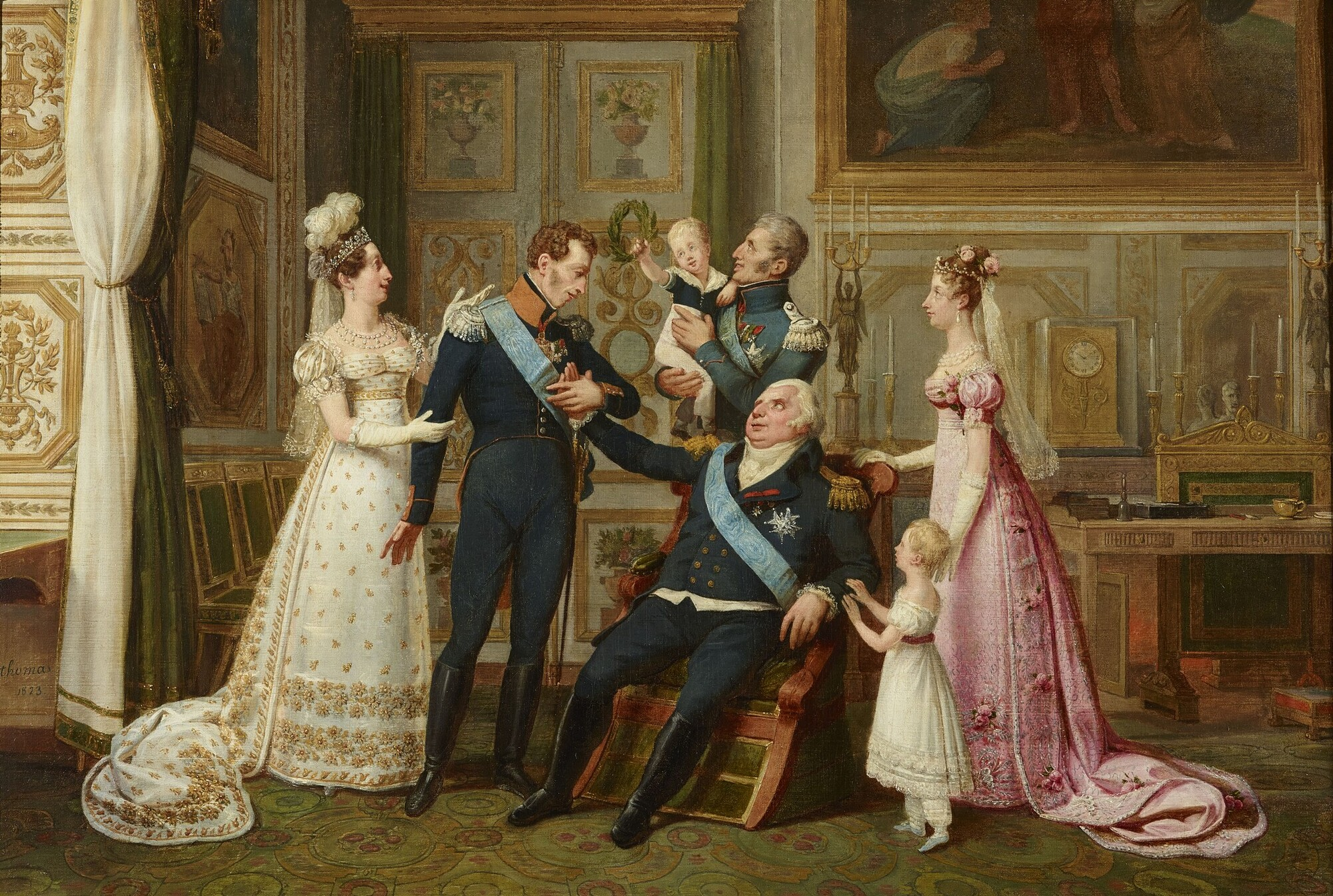
The House of Bourbon in 1823 by Jean-Baptiste Thomas. From left to right: Marie-Thérèse Charlotte, Madame Royale; Louis-Antoine, Duke of Angoulême; Prince Henri de Bourbon; Charles-Philippe, Count of Artois; Louis XVIII; Princess Louise-Marie-Thérèse d'Artois; Marie-Caroline, Duchess of Berry

On 13 February 1820, tragedy struck when the Count of Artois' younger son, the Duke of Berry, was assassinated by the Bonapartist Louis Pierre Louvel, a saddler. Soon after, the royal family was cheered when it was learned that the Duchess of Berry was pregnant at the time of her husband's death. On 29 September 1820, she gave birth to a son, Henri, Duke of Bordeaux, the 'Miracle child', who later, as the Bourbon pretender to the French throne, assumed the title of Count of Chambord.

=== Madame la Dauphine ===
Louis XVIII died on 16 September 1824 and was succeeded by his younger brother, the Count of Artois, as Charles X. Marie-Thérèse's husband was now heir to the throne, and she was styled Madame la Dauphine. She is the only Dauphine whose father was a King of France. However, anti-monarchist sentiment was on the rise again. Charles's Ultra-royalist sympathies alienated many Revolutionaries.

On 2 August 1830, after the July Revolution which lasted three days, Charles X, who with his family had gone to the château de Rambouillet, abdicated in favour of his son, who in turn abdicated in favour of his nephew, the nine-year-old Duke of Bordeaux. However, in spite of the fact that Charles X had asked him to be regent for the young King, Louis Philippe, Duke of Orléans, usurped the crown when the Chamber of Deputies named him King of the French.

On 4 August, in a long cortège, Marie-Thérèse left Rambouillet for a new exile with her uncle, her husband, her young nephew, as well as his mother, the Duchess of Berry, and his sister Louise d'Artois. On 16 August the family had reached the port of Cherbourg where they boarded a ship for Britain. Louis Philippe had taken care of the arrangements for the departure and sailing of the dynasty.

== Final exile (1830–1848) ==
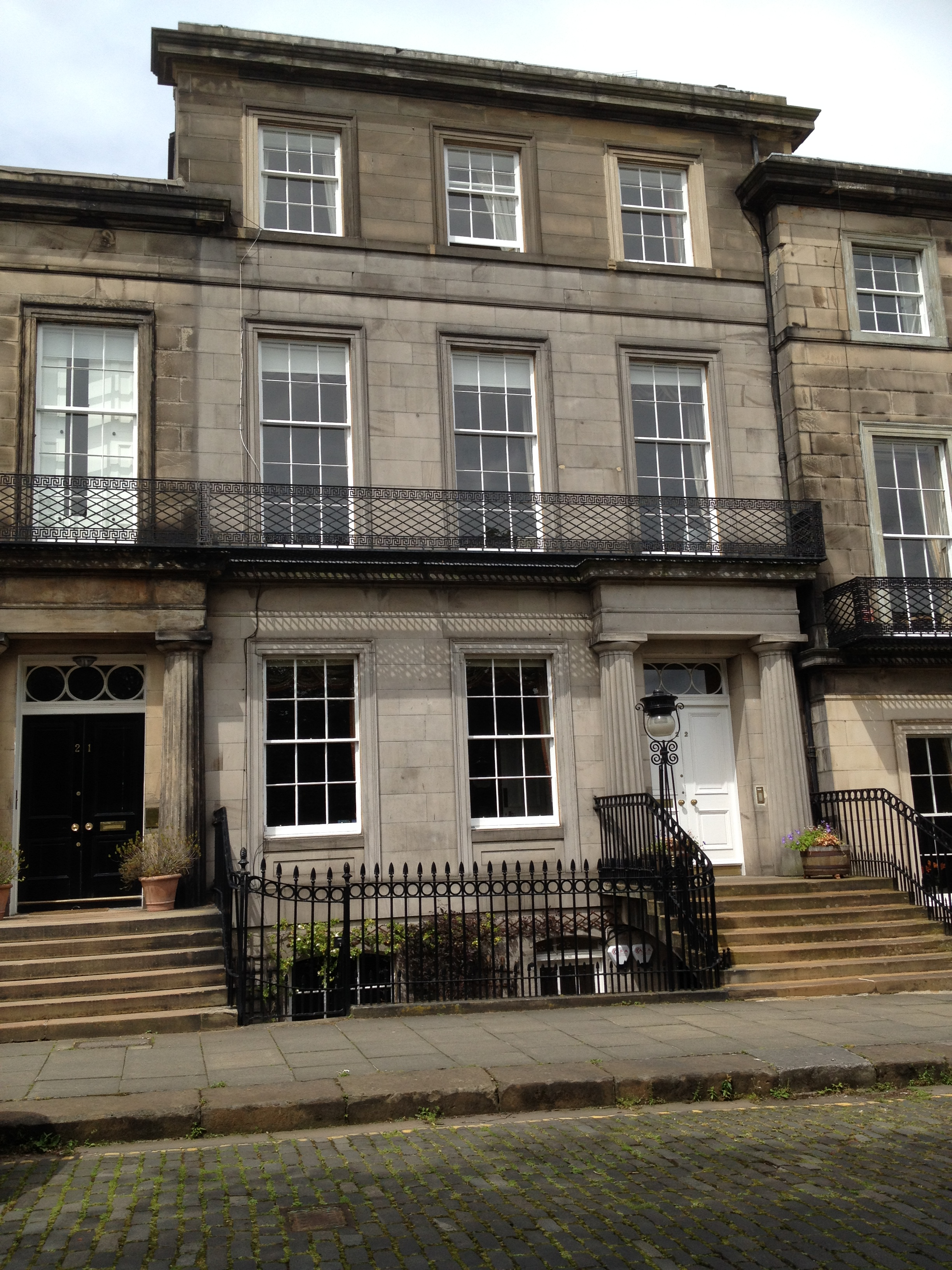
22 Regent Terrace, Edinburgh

The royal family lived in what is now 22 (then 21) Regent Terrace in Edinburgh until 1833 when Charles X chose to move to Prague as a guest of Marie-Thérèse's cousin, Francis I of Austria. They moved into luxurious apartments in Prague Castle. Later, the royal family left Prague and moved to the estate of Count Coronini near Gorizia, which was then part of Austria but is in Italy today. Marie-Thérèse devotedly nursed her uncle through his last illness in 1836, when he died of cholera.

Her husband died in 1844 and was buried next to his father. Marie-Thérèse then moved to Schloss Frohsdorf, a Baroque castle just outside Vienna, where she spent her days taking walks, reading, sewing, and praying. Her nephew, who now styled himself as the Count of Chambord, and his sister joined her there. In 1848, Louis Philippe's regime ended in a revolution and, for the second time, France became a republic.

== Death ==
Marie-Thérèse died of pneumonia on 19 October 1851, three days after the 58th anniversary of her mother's death. She was buried next to her father-in-law and her husband, in the crypt of the Franciscan monastery church of Castagnavizza in Görz, then in Austria, now Kostanjevica in the Slovenian city of Nova Gorica. Marie-Thérèse had remained a devout Roman Catholic.

Later, her nephew Henri, the Count of Chambord, last male of the senior line of the House of Bourbon; his wife, the Countess of Chambord (formerly the Archduchess Maria Theresa of Austria-Este, daughter of Francis IV, Duke of Modena and his wife, Princess Maria Beatrice of Savoy); and the count's only sister, Louise, Duchess of Parma, were also laid to rest in the crypt in Görz. The famous antiquarian the Duke of Blacas was also buried there in honour of his dutiful years of service as a minister to Louis XVIII and Charles X.

Marie-Thérèse is described on her gravestone as the 'Queen Dowager of France', her legitimate style as the widow of King Louis XIX of France.

=== Dark Countess' mystery ===
In October 2013, the grave of a woman in Hildburghausen, Thuringia, Germany, was exhumed to obtain DNA for testing, to determine if she was Marie-Thérèse. The woman, who gave her name as Sophie Botta, lived in a castle in the area from 1807 until her death in 1837, and never spoke in public, nor was seen outside without her face being veiled. She was accompanied by Leonardus Cornelius van der Valck, a secretary in the Dutch embassy in Paris from July 1798 to April 1799, and together they were known as the Dark Counts. Van der Valck addressed Botta as 'Your Grace' and they only spoke to each other in French. Some German historians believe she was the real Marie-Thérèse, who had swapped places with her adoptive sister, Ernestine Lambriquet, following the Revolution. Possibly as she was too traumatised to resume a role in society, but also as a result of a pregnancy, after abuse by her captors, which was referred to in a letter from a family friend, at the Spanish court, in 1795.

The DNA testing revealed that the Dark Countess was not Marie-Thérèse, but rather another woman whose identity remains a mystery. On 28 July 2014 the 'Interessenkreis Dunkelgräfin' broadcast the results on television which proved beyond doubt that the Dunkelgräfin was not Marie-Thérèse.

== In fiction ==
=== Film ===
Marie-Thérèse has been portrayed in several motion picture adaptations, mainly to do with her mother's life.

- In 1934, she was played, under the name Duchess d'Angoulême, by Gladys Cooper in The Iron Duke, opposite George Arliss as the Duke of Wellington.
- In 1938, she was played by Marilyn Knowlden in Marie Antoinette, opposite Norma Shearer as the queen.
- In 1975, in the French television drama Marie-Antoinette, Marie-Thérèse was played by Anne-Laura Meury.
- In 1981 "The nameless castle" a Hungarian TV show from a novel of Mór Jókai. The romantic story takes place in West Hungary(near Vienna) during the Napoleonic era, around Lake Fertő. Here, Count Wavel hides the French heiress from the revolution and Napoleon. A spy, Catherine was sent to track them but falls in love with the count, even though she should have obtained the princess in disguise from him. Napoleon's armies arrive in Hungary after defeat of Austrian main army by Wagram, the count goes to war against them with the Hungarian nobles, and unsuspectingly entrusts Marie to Caroline.
- In 1989 she was played by Katherine Flynn in The French Revolution. Katherine's character's on-screen mother, Marie Antoinette, was played by her real mother, Jane Seymour.
- In 2001, Daisy Bevan played Marie-Thérèse briefly in the costume-drama The Affair of the Necklace opposite her mother Joely Richardson as Marie Antoinette.
- In 2006, Marie Antoinette, directed by Sofia Coppola, was released. Marie-Thérèse was portrayed by two different child actresses. At age two, she was played by Lauriane Mascaro, and at age six she was played by Florrie Betts. Kirsten Dunst portrayed her mother, Marie Antoinette.

=== Theatre and literature ===
She has also been portrayed in the following:

- All Those Who Suffered; a Northern Irish play on the mystery of Louis XVII
- Madame Royale, a novel by Elena Maria Vidal, based on Marie-Thérèse's life
- The Dark Tower, a novel by Sharon Stewart, based on The Journal of Madame Royale, which were the writings of Marie-Thérèse. The novel was later re-released as part of the Beneath the Crown series under the title The Princess in the Tower.
- The Lacemaker and the Princess (2007), a children's novel by Kimberly Brubaker Bradley
- Faces of the Dead by Suzanne Weyn (2014) ISBN 978-0545425315
- Hungry Marie (2017), a manga by Ryuhei Tamura
- When Blood Lies by C.S. Harris (2022) ISBN 978-0-593-10269-5

== Ancestry ==
Ancestors of Marie Thérèse of France

8. Louis XV of France
4. Louis, Dauphin of France
9. Marie Leszczyńska
2. Louis XVI of France
10. Augustus III of Poland
5. Maria Josepha of Saxony
11. Maria Josepha of Austria
1. Marie-Thérèse, Duchess of Angoulême
12. Leopold, Duke of Lorraine
6. Francis I, Holy Roman Emperor
13. Élisabeth Charlotte of Orléans
3. Marie Antoinette of Austria
14. Charles VI, Holy Roman Emperor
7. Maria Theresa of Austria
15. Elisabeth Christine of Brunswick

Marie-Thérèse was a descendant of the Holy Roman Emperors through her mother, Archduchess Marie Antoinette of Austria, who was the daughter of Maria Theresa, Holy Roman Empress; the empress wanted all of her eldest granddaughters to be named after her.

== References and notes ==
Marie Thérèse of France House of Bourbon Cadet branch of the Capetian dynasty Born: 19 December 1778 Died: 19 October 1851
French royalty
Vacant Title last held by Marie Louise of Austria as Empress of the French	Queen consort of France; 2 August 1830 for 20 minutes	Vacant Title next held by Maria Amalia of the Two Sicilies as Queen of the French
Titles in pretence
Vacant July Revolution Title last held by Marie Joséphine of Savoy	— TITULAR — Queen consort of France; 6 November 1836 – 3 June 1844	Vacant Title next held by Maria Theresa of Austria-Este
