= Louis XV =

King of France from 1715 to 1774

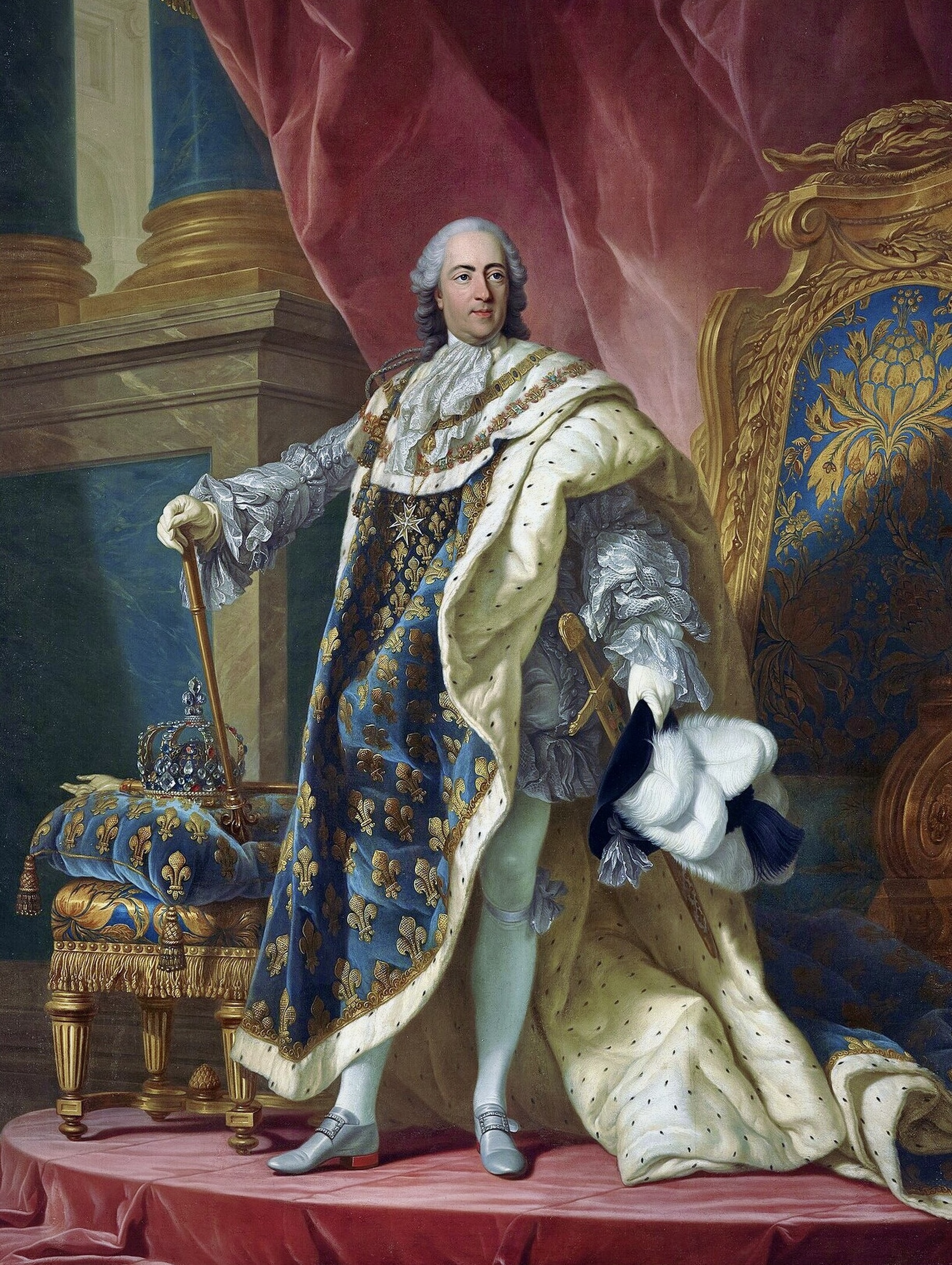
- Portrait by Louis-Michel van Loo, c. 1763

King of France
- Reign: 1 September 1715 – 10 May 1774
- Coronation: 25 October 1722; Reims Cathedral
- Predecessor: Louis XIV
- Successor: Louis XVI
- Regent: Philippe II, Duke of Orléans (1715–1723)
- Chief ministers: See list: Guillaume Dubois (1715–1723); The Prince of Condé (1723–1726); Cardinal de Fleury (1726–1743); The Duke of Choiseul (1758–1770)
- Born: Louis, Duke of Anjou; 15 February 1710; Palace of Versailles, France
- Died: 10 May 1774 (aged 64); Palace of Versailles, France
- Burial: 12 May 1774; Basilica of Saint Denis, Saint Denis, France
- Spouse: Marie Leszczyńska (m. 1725; died 1768)
- Issue among others...: Élisabeth, Duchess of Parma; Henriette; Marie Louise; Louis, Dauphin of France; Philippe, Duke of Anjou; Adélaïde; Victoire; Sophie; Thérèse; Louise, Prioress of Saint Denis
- House: Bourbon
- Father: Louis, Duke of Burgundy
- Mother: Marie Adélaïde of Savoy
- Religion: Catholicism

Louis XV (15 February 1710 – 10 May 1774), known as Louis the Beloved (French: le Bien-Aimé), was King of France from 1 September 1715 until his death in 1774. He succeeded his great-grandfather Louis XIV at the age of five. Until he reached maturity (then defined as his 13th birthday) in 1723, the kingdom was ruled by his grand-uncle Philippe II, Duke of Orléans, as Regent of France. Cardinal Fleury was chief minister from 1726 until his death in 1743, at which time the king took sole control of the kingdom.

His reign of almost 59 years (from 1715 to 1774) was the second longest in the history of France, exceeded only by his predecessor, Louis XIV, who had ruled for 72 years (from 1643 to 1715). In 1748, Louis returned the Austrian Netherlands, won at the Battle of Fontenoy of 1745. He ceded New France in North America to Great Britain and Spain at the conclusion of the disastrous Seven Years' War in 1763. He incorporated the territories of the Duchy of Lorraine and the Corsican Republic into the Kingdom of France. Historians generally criticize his reign and maintain that his incompetence and extravagance weakened France, depleted the treasury, discredited the absolute monarchy, and diminished the country's reputation internationally. However, a minority of scholars argue that he was popular during his lifetime, but that his reputation was later blackened by revolutionary propaganda. His grandson and successor Louis XVI inherited a kingdom on the brink of financial disaster and gravely in need of political reform, laying the groundwork for the French Revolution of 1789.

== Early life and the Regency (1710–1723) ==
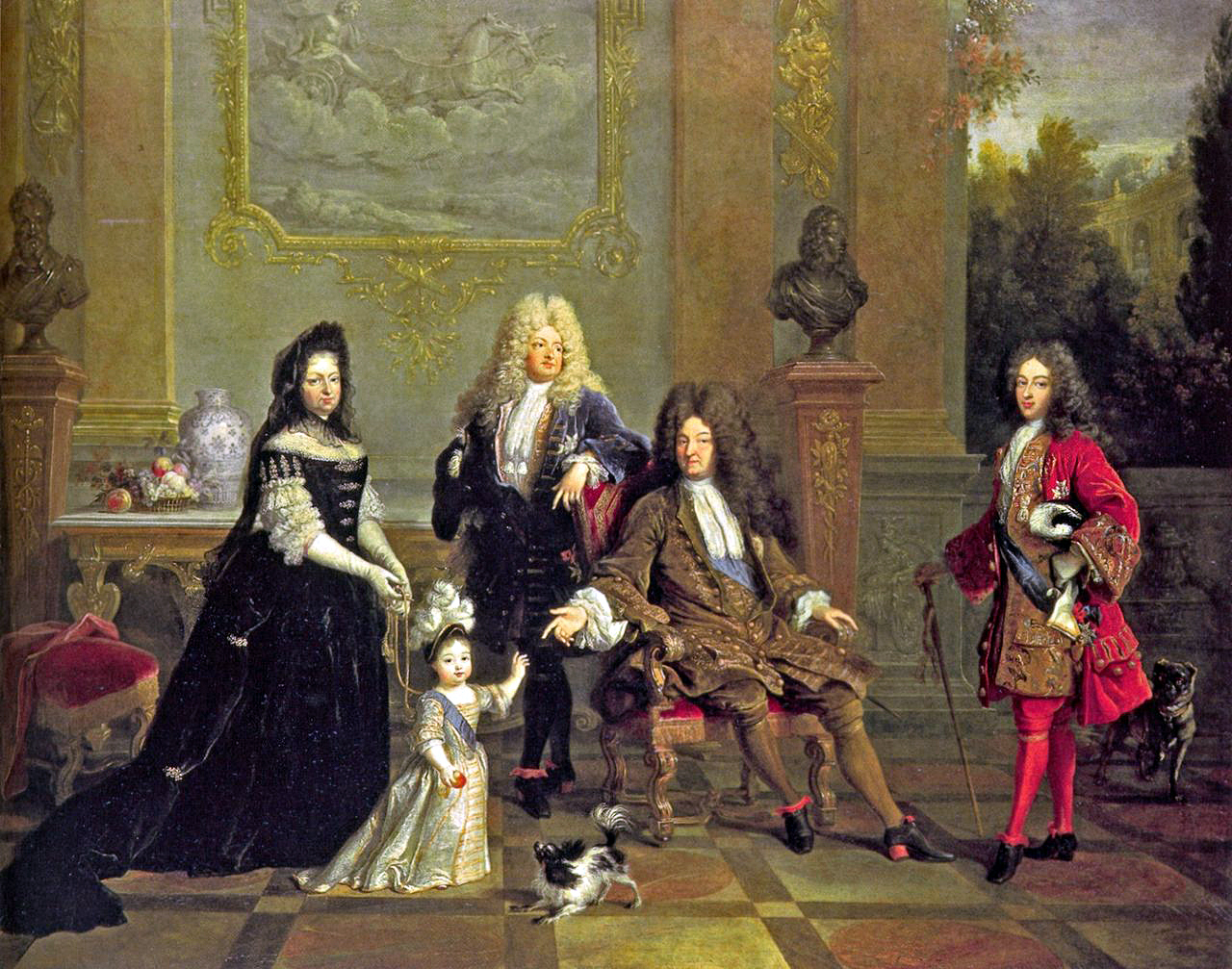
The infant Louis with his governess, grandfather, great-grandfather and father, and the busts of Henry IV and Louis XIII in the background. Madame de Ventadour holds her charge's leading strings. The portrait, painted for her, commemorates her part in saving the dynasty.

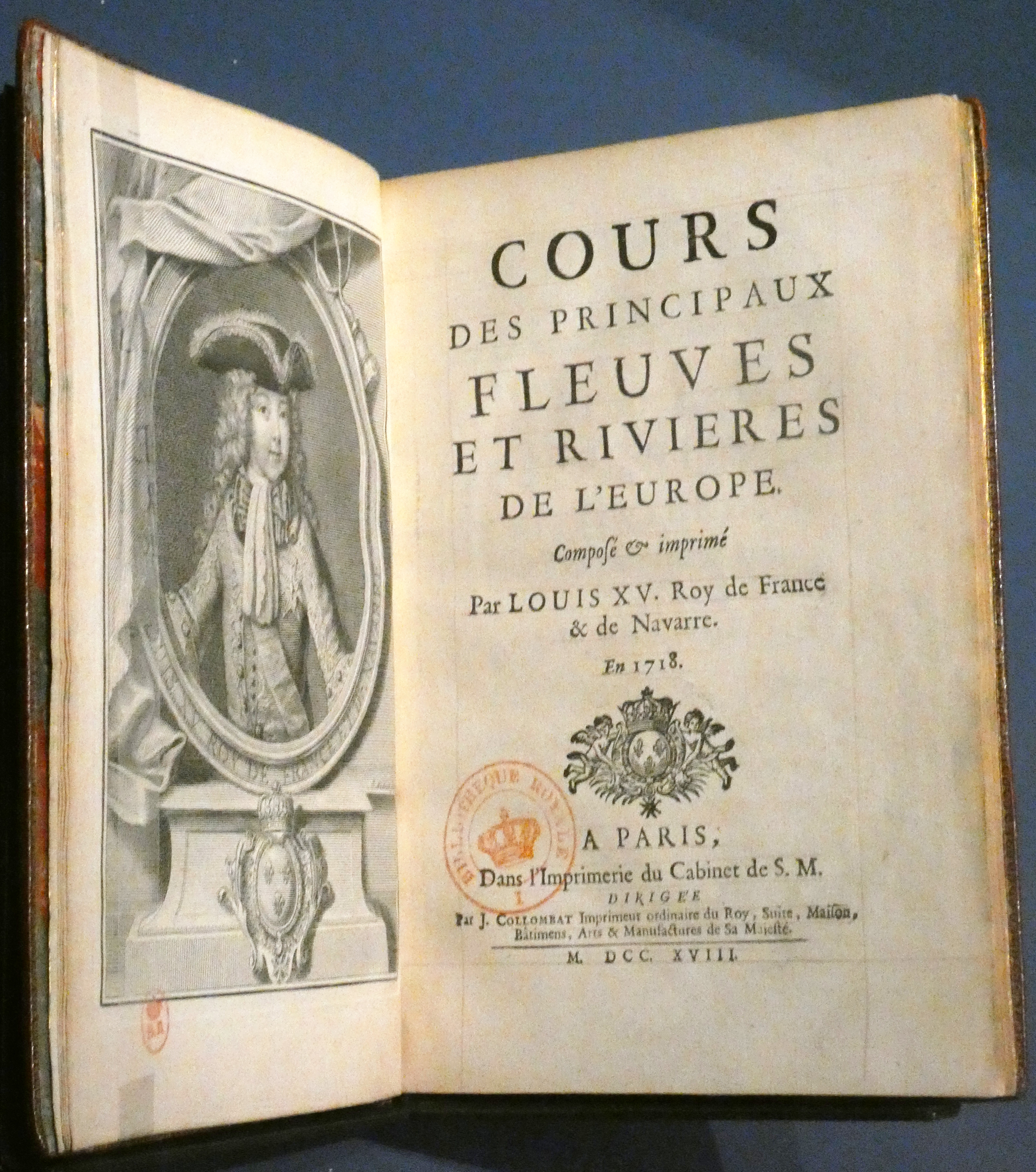
Cours des principaux fleuves et rivières de l'Europe, or "Courses of the main rivers of Europe", composed & printed by Louis XV, aged 8. Education of the young king included geography and printing.

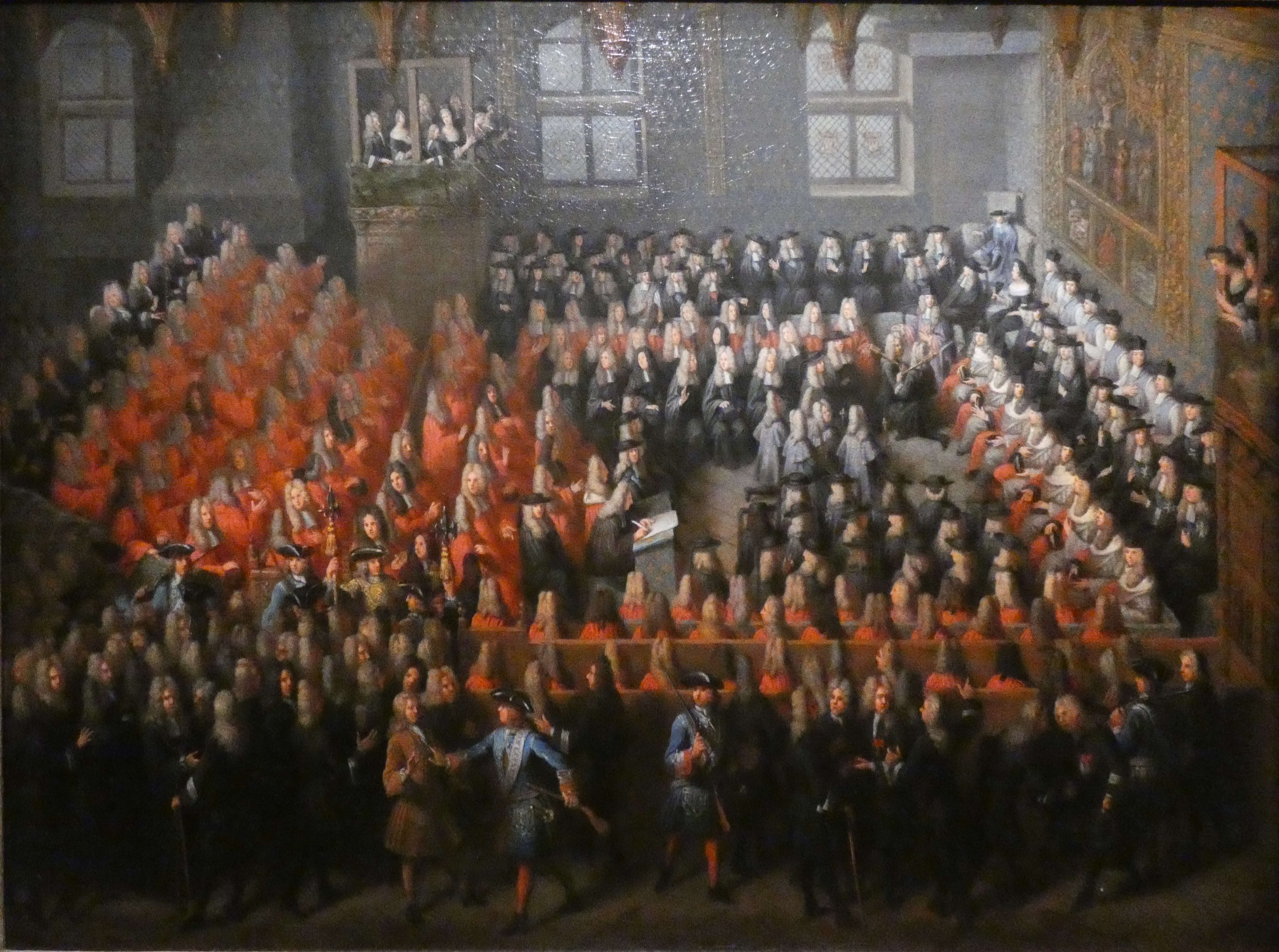
Lit de justice held by young Louis XV; his governess, the only woman in the assembly, sits next to him

Louis XV was the great-grandson of Louis XIV and the third son of the Duke of Burgundy (1682–1712), and his wife Marie Adélaïde of Savoy, who was the eldest daughter of Duke Victor Amadeus II of Savoy. He was born in the Palace of Versailles on 15 February 1710 and was immediately styled the Duke of Anjou. At this time, the possibility of the Duke of Anjou becoming the next king seemed rather remote as Louis XIV's eldest son and heir, Louis's paternal grandfather Louis, Grand Dauphin, was expected to assume the throne upon the old king's death. Next in line to the throne behind the Grand Dauphin was his eldest son- Louis's father Le Petit Dauphin and then Louis's elder brother, a child named Louis, Duke of Brittany. Disease, however, steered the line of succession forward three generations and sideways: on 14 April 1711 the Grand Dauphin died of smallpox, and less than a year later, on 12 February 1712, the future king's mother, Marie Adélaïde, who had been stricken with measles, died, followed six days later by Louis's father, her devoted husband who would not leave her side during her illness. With the death of both the Grand and Petit dauphins, Louis's elder brother immediately became Dauphin of France, but just over two weeks further still, on 7 March, it was found that both the elder Louis and the younger Louis had also contracted measles. The two brothers were treated in the traditional way, with bloodletting. On the night of 8–9 March, the new Dauphin, age five, died from the combination of the disease and the treatment. The governess of the younger Louis, Madame de Ventadour, forbade the doctors to bleed the two-year-old Duke of Anjou by hiding him in a palace closet where she cared for him alone, where he survived despite being very ill. When Louis XIV himself finally died on 1 September 1715, Louis, at the age of five, trembling and crying and against all probability, inherited the throne as Louis XV.

According to Charles V's royal ordinance of 1374, the Kingdom of France must be governed by a regent until a given king had reached the age of 13. The title of regent was customarily assigned to an under-aged king's nearest adult living relative, often his mother or an uncle. But as Louis's mother had been struck down by disease, and as his only uncle had already been enthroned as King of Spain, the job fell to his great-uncle Philippe II, Duke of Orléans. However Louis XIV had distrusted Philippe, who was a renowned soldier but was regarded by the late King as an atheist and libertine. The King referred privately to Philippe as a Fanfaron des crimes ("braggart of crimes"). Louis XIV had desired for France to be ruled by his favorite but illegitimate son, the Duke of Maine (illegitimate son of Louis XIV and Madame de Montespan), who was in the council and who, because of a dramatic change in the laws of succession instituted by Louis XIV, and, as his oldest surviving male descendant, could now legally become king if the legitimate direct line of succession became extinguished. In August 1714, shortly before his own death, the King rewrote his will to restrict the powers of the regent; it stipulated that the nation was to be governed by a Regency Council made up of fourteen members until the new king reached the age of majority. Philippe, nephew of Louis XIV, was named president of this Council, but other members included the Duke of Maine and at least seven of his well-known allies. According to the will, all decisions were to be made by majority vote, meaning that the president could always be outvoted by Maine's party and effectively allowing Maine to rule France for the next eight years.

Philippe saw the trap. The Parlement of Paris, an assembly of French nobles among whom Philippe had many friends, was the only judicial body in France with the authority to have this portion of the deceased King's will annulled, and immediately after the King's death Philippe approached the Parlement requesting that they do just this. In exchange for their support he agreed to restore to the Parlement its droit de remontrance (right of remonstrance) – the right to challenge a king's decisions – which had been removed by Louis XIV. The droit de remontrance would impair the monarchy's functioning and marked the beginning of a conflict between the Parlement and King which contributed to the French Revolution in 1789. In the meantime, however, the will was annulled and Philippe was installed as Regent with full powers to act in the name of the King in all matters.

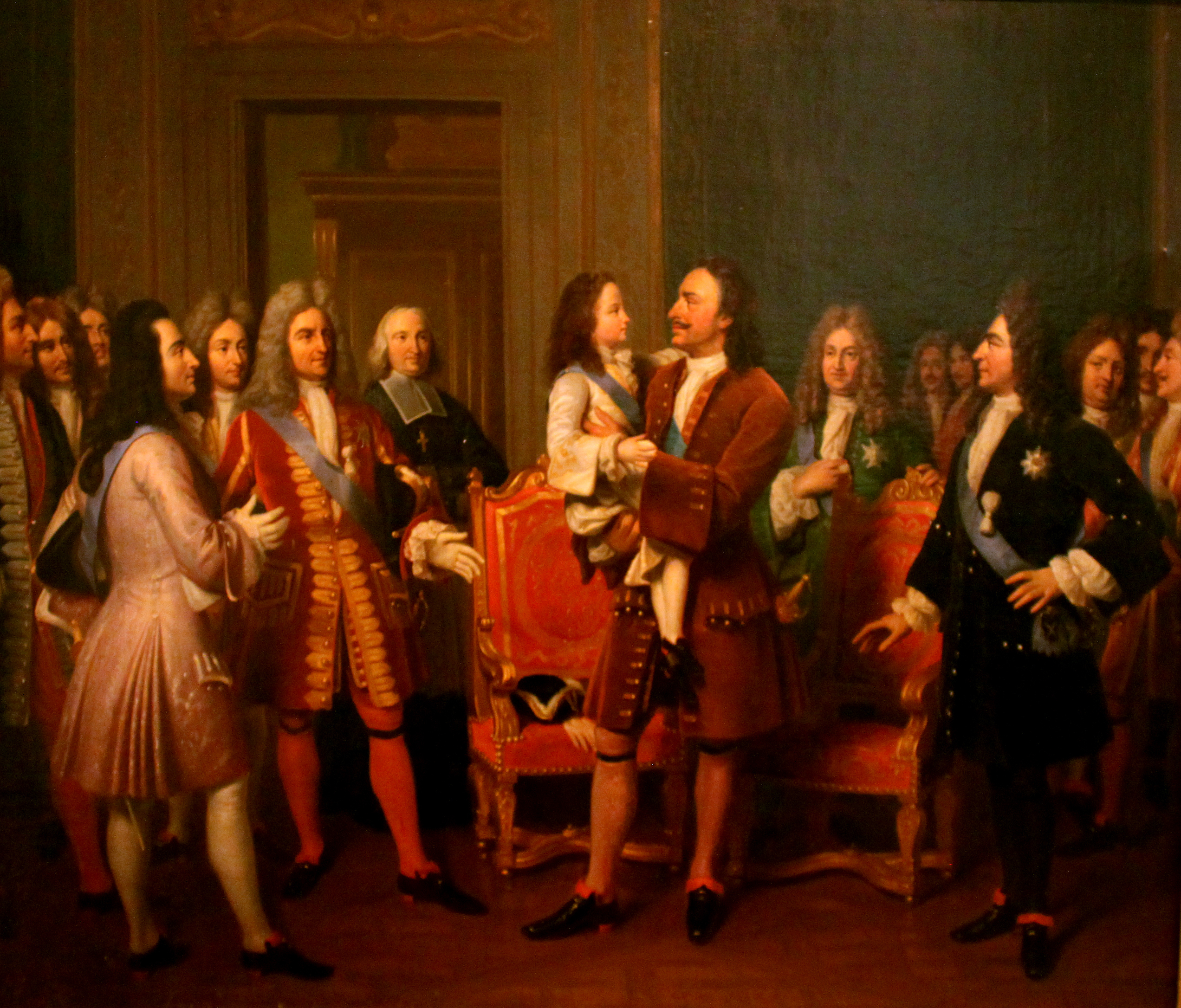
Tsar Peter the Great of Russia picks up the young King (1717), painted around 1838

On 9 September 1715, Philippe had the young King transported away from the court in Versailles to Paris, where the Regent had his own residence in the Palais Royal. On 12 September, the King performed his first official act, opening the first lit de justice of his reign at the Palais Royal. From September 1715 until January 1716 he lived in the Château de Vincennes, before moving to the Tuileries Palace. In February 1717, when he had reached the age of seven, the King was taken away in tears from his beloved governess Madame Ventadour and placed in the care of François de Villeroy, the 73-year-old Duke and Maréchal de France, named as his governor in Louis XIV's will of August 1714. Villeroy instructed the young King in court etiquette, taught him how to review a regiment, and how to receive royal visitors. His guests included the Russian Tsar Peter the Great in 1717; at their first meeting and contrary to ordinary protocol between such great rulers, the two-meter-tall Tsar greeted Louis by picking him up under the arms and giving him a kiss. Louis also learned the skills of horseback riding and hunting, which became great passions. In 1720, following the example of Louis XIV, Villeroy had the young Louis dance in public in two ballets—once at the Tuileries Palace on 24 February 1720, and then again in The Ballet des Elements on 31 December 1721. The shy Louis was terrified of these performances, and never danced in another ballet.

The King's tutor was the Abbé André-Hercule de Fleury, the bishop of Fréjus (and later to become Cardinal de Fleury), who saw that he was instructed in Latin, Italian, history and geography, astronomy, mathematics and drawing, and cartography. The King had charmed the visiting Russian Tsar in 1717 by identifying the major rivers, cities and geographic features of Russia. In his later life the King retained his passion for science and geography; he created departments in physics (1769) and mechanics (1773) at the Collège de France, and he sponsored the first complete and accurate map of France, the Cartes de Cassini. Besides his academic studies, he received a practical education in government. Beginning in 1720 he attended the regular meetings of the Regency Council.

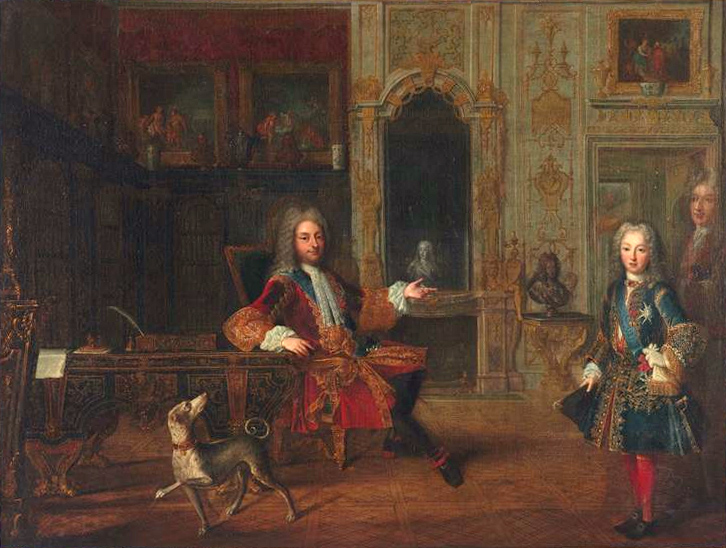
Louis with the regent, Philippe of Orléans (1718)

One economic crisis disrupted the Regency; the Scottish economist and banker John Law was named controller-general of finances. In May 1716, he opened the Banque Générale Privée ("General Private Bank"), which soon became the Banque Royal. It was mostly funded by the government, and was one of the earliest banks to issue paper money, which he promised could be exchanged for gold. He also persuaded wealthy Parisians to invest in the Mississippi Company, a scheme for the colonization of the French territory of Louisiana. The stock of the company first soared and then collapsed in 1720, taking the bank with it. Law fled France, and wealthy Parisians became reluctant to make further investments or trust any currency but gold.

In 1719, France, in alliance with Britain and the Dutch Republic, declared war on Spain. Spain was defeated on both land and sea, and quickly sought peace. A Franco-Spanish treaty was signed on 27 March 1721. The two governments proposed to unite their royal families by marrying Louis to his cousin, Mariana Victoria of Spain, the three-year-old daughter of Philip V of Spain, who was himself a grandson of Louis XIV. The marriage contract was signed on 25 November 1721, and the future bride came to France and took up residence in the Louvre. However, after the death of the Regent, in 1725, the new Prime Minister decided she was too young to have children soon enough, and she was sent back to Spain. During the rest of the Regency, France was at peace, and in 1720, the Regent decreed an official silence on religious conflicts. Montesquieu and Voltaire published their first works, and the Age of Enlightenment in France quietly began.

== Government of the Duke of Bourbon (1723–1726) ==
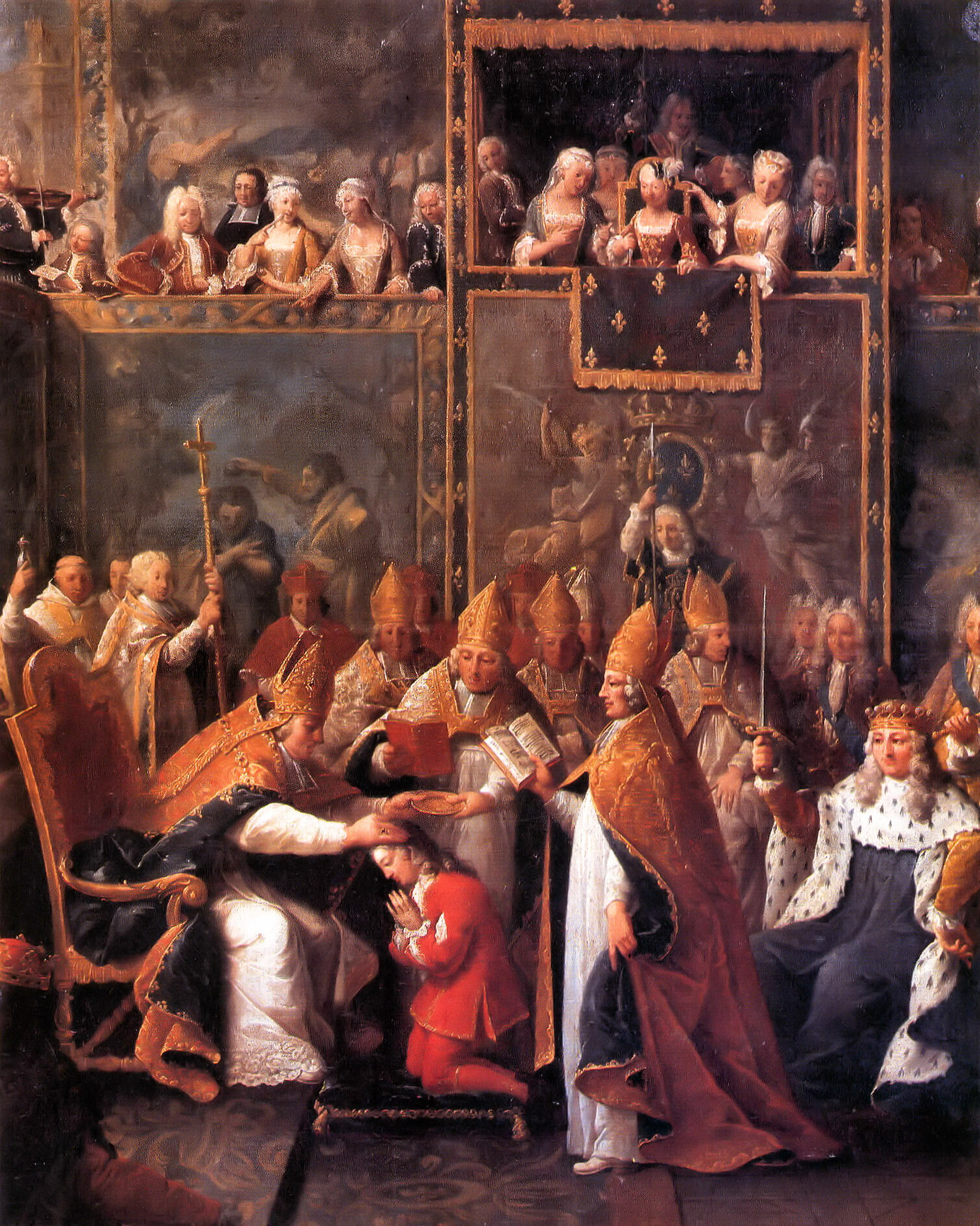
Coronation of Louis XV at Reims Cathedral (1722)

On 15 June 1722, as Louis approached his thirteenth birthday, the year of his majority, he left Paris and moved back to Versailles, where he had happy memories of his childhood, but where he was far from the reach of public opinion. On 25 October, Louis was crowned King at the Cathedral of Reims. On 15 February 1723, the king's majority was declared by the Parlement of Paris, officially ending the regency. Philippe continued to manage the government, and took the title of Prime Minister in August 1723, but while visiting his mistress, far from the court and medical care, he died in December of the same year. Following the advice of his preceptor Fleury, Louis XV appointed his cousin Louis Henri, Duke of Bourbon, to replace the late Duke of Orléans as prime minister.

=== Marriage and children ===
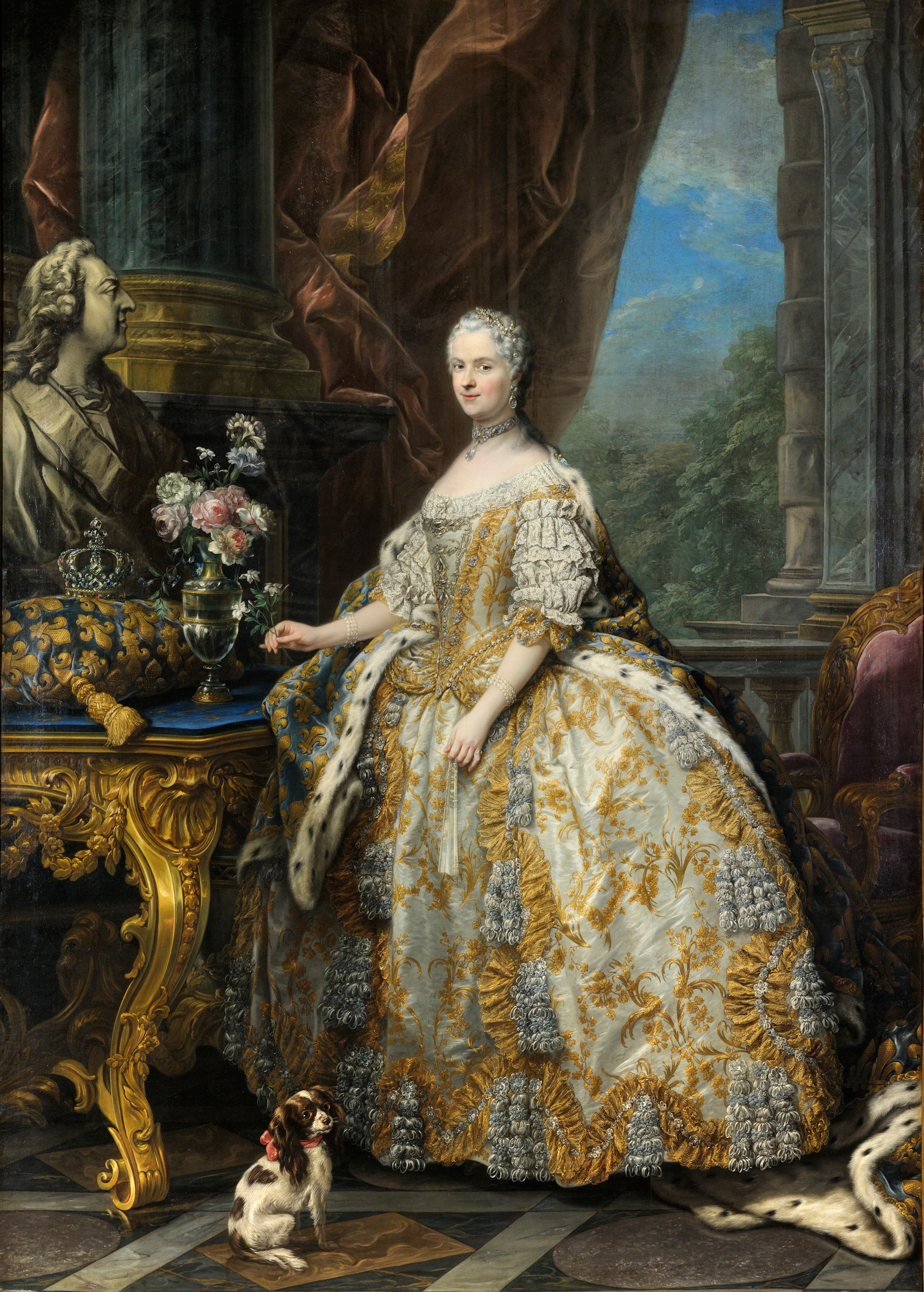
Queen Marie Leszczyńska, by Carle Van Loo (1747)

Before his ascension, he was engaged to Infanta Mariana Victoria, and when the regent died, the royal court knew it was too early for the Infanta to have children, so the engagement was called off and she was sent back to Spain. One of the first priorities of the Duke of Bourbon was to find a bride for the King, to assure the continuity of the monarchy, and especially to prevent the succession to the throne of the Orléans branch of the family, the rivals of his branch. A list of 99 princesses was prepared, among them being Princess Anne of Great Britain, Barbara of Portugal, Princess Charlotte Amalie of Denmark, Elisabeth Therese of Lorraine, Enrichetta d'Este and the Duke's own sisters Henriette Louise de Bourbon and Élisabeth Alexandrine de Bourbon. In the end, the 21-year-old Marie Leszczyńska, daughter of Stanislaus I, the deposed king of Poland, was chosen. Of the others,

- Mariana Victoria, Louis’s former fiancée, would marry the Crown Prince of Portugal and be mother to future Maria I.
- Anne of Great Britain would marry the Prince of Orange.
- Barbara of Portugal would marry the Prince of Asturias.
- Charlotte Amalie of Denmark would live to be unmarried.
- Elisabeth Therese of Lorraine would become the third wife of the King of Sardinia and Duke of Savoy.
- Enrichetta d’Este would marry the Duke of Parma, and later Leopold of Hesse-Darmstadt.
- Henriette Louise would become Abbess de Beaumont-lès-Tours.
- Élisabeth-Alexandrine would also never marry.

The marriage was celebrated in September 1725 when the king was 15 and Marie was 22. Louis was said to have fallen in love with Marie instantly, and consummated his marriage to her seven times on their wedding night. From 1727 to 1737, Marie gave Louis XV ten children: eight girls and two boys. Of the boys, only the elder, Dauphin Louis (1729–1765), survived childhood. While he did not live to rule, his birth as the awaited heir was welcomed with celebration in all spheres of French society. (The Dauphin Louis would go on to marry Maria Josepha of Saxony in 1747, who gave birth to the next three Kings of France: Louis XVI, Louis XVIII, and Charles X). Louis XV's second son, the Duke of Anjou, was born in 1730 and died in 1733. Of the daughters only the two oldest daughters, who were fraternal twins, were raised at Versailles; the others were sent away to be raised at the Abbey of Fontevrault.

Marie was a pious and timid Queen who spent most of her time secluded with her own courtiers. She was a musician, read extensively, and played social games with her courtiers. After 1737, she did not share her bed with the King. She was deeply upset by the death of her son the Dauphin in 1765, and died on 24 June 1768.

=== Unigenitus, Jansenism and religious conflict ===
One of the first serious conflicts that disturbed the early reign of Louis XV was a battle within the Catholic Church over a Papal Bull called Unigenitus. The Bull was requested by Louis XIV of Pope Clement XI and granted on 8 September 1713. It was a fierce condemnation of Jansenism, a Catholic doctrine based largely on the teachings of Saint Augustine. Jansenism had attracted many important followers in France, including the philosopher Blaise Pascal, the poet Racine, aristocrats including Madame de Sévigné and Madame de Lafayette. The faculty of the Sorbonne, then primarily a theological college and a center of Jansenism, demanded clarification from the government. The Jansenists were allied with the Gallicans, theologians who wanted the Catholic Church in France to be distinctly French. The opposition to Unigenitus was particularly strong among the members of the Parlement of Paris, the assembly of the nobles. Despite the protests, on 24 March 1730 Cardinal Fleury persuaded the King to issue a decree that Unigenitus was the law of France as well as that of the Church.

The government and church imposed repressive measures. On 27 April 1732, the Archbishop of Paris threatened to excommunicate any member of the Church who read the Jansenist journal, Nouvelles Ecclésiastiques. The Parlement was strictly forbidden to discuss religious questions, preventing them from opposing the Unigenitus bull. Priests who did not accept Unigenitus were denied the authority to administer last rites to the dying. A new tax, the cinquantième, was levied against religious figures who had previously been exempted from taxation. Jansenists and Protestants were threatened with prison and banishment. As a result of these repressive acts, religious dissent remained an issue throughout the King's reign.

Tension grew between the Duke of Bourbon and Cardinal de Fleury over the King's favor. The Duke's rigid and cold personality did not appeal to the young King, who turned to his old tutor for advice on how to run the affairs of state. When the King insisted that Fleury was to be included in all meetings between himself and the Duke of Bourbon, the Duke was infuriated and began to undermine Fleury's position at court. When the King became aware of the Duke's intrigue, he abruptly dismissed him and replaced him with Fleury.

== Rule with Cardinal de Fleury (1726–1743) ==
=== Finances and control of dissent ===
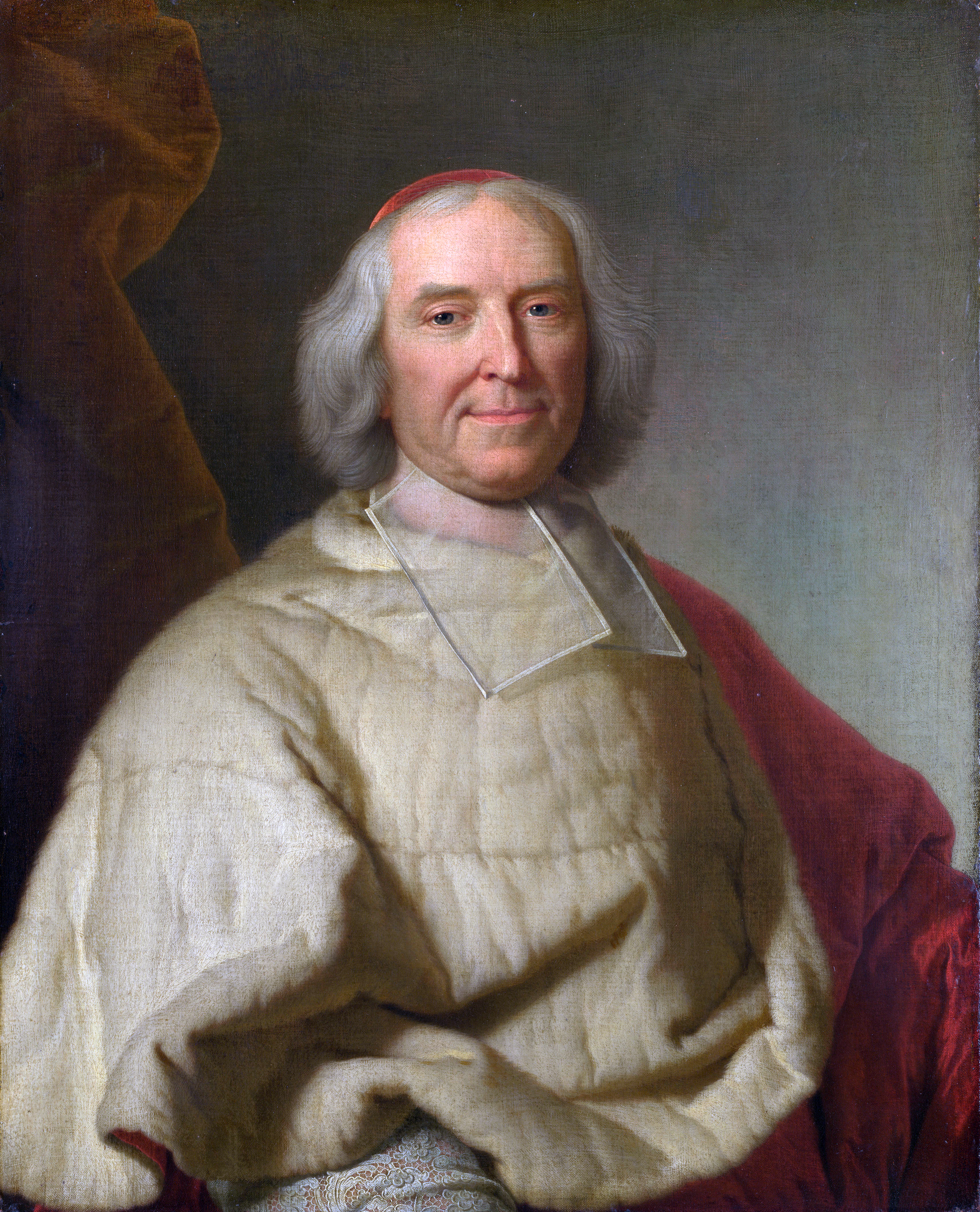
Cardinal de Fleury by Hyacinthe Rigaud

From 1726 until his death in 1743, Fleury effectively ruled France with the king's assent. Fleury dictated the choices to be made, and encouraged the king's indecision and flattered his pride. He forbade the king to discuss politics with the Queen. In order to save on court expenses, he sent the youngest four daughters of the king to be educated at the Abbey of Fontevrault. On the surface it was the most peaceful and prosperous period of the reign of Louis XV, but it was built upon a growing volcano of opposition, particularly from the noble members of the Parlements, who saw their privileges and power reduced. Fleury made the papal doctrine Unigenitus part of French law and forbade any debate in Parlement, which caused the silent opposition to grow. He also downplayed the importance of the French Navy, which would prove be a fatal mistake in future conflicts.

Fleury showed the King the virtues of a stable government; he kept the same Minister of War, Bauyn d'Angervilliers, and controller of the currency, Philibert Orry, for twelve years, and his minister of foreign affairs, Germain Louis Chauvelin, for ten years. His minister of the Navy and household of the King, the Conte de Maurepas, was in office the entire period. In all he had just thirteen ministers over the course of nineteen years, while the King, in his last thirty-one years, employed forty-three.

Louis's Controller-General of Finances Michel Robert Le Peletier des Forts (1726–1730), stabilized the French currency, though he was expelled for enriching himself in 1730. His successor, Philibert Orry, substantially reduced the debt caused by the War of the Spanish Succession, and simplified and made more fair the tax system, though he still had to depend upon the unpopular dixieme, or tax of the tenth of the revenue of every citizen. Orry managed, in the last two years of Fleury's government, to balance the royal budget, an accomplishment never again repeated during the rest of the reign.

Fleury's government expanded commerce, both within France and with the rest of the world. Transportation and shipping were improved with the completion of the Saint-Quentin canal (linking the Oise and Somme rivers) in 1738, which was later extended to the Escaut River and the Low Countries, and the systematic building of a national road network. By the middle of the 18th century, France had the most modern and extensive road network in the world. The Council of Commerce stimulated trade, and French foreign maritime trade increased from 80 to 308 million livres between 1716 and 1748.

The Government continued its policy of religious repression, aimed at the Jansenists and the so-called "Gallicans" in Parlements of nobles. After the dismissal of 139 members of provincial parlements for opposing the official government and papal doctrine of Unigenitus, the Parlement of Paris had to register the Unigenitus papal bull and was forbidden to hear religious cases in the future.

=== Foreign relations – New alliances; the War of the Polish Succession ===
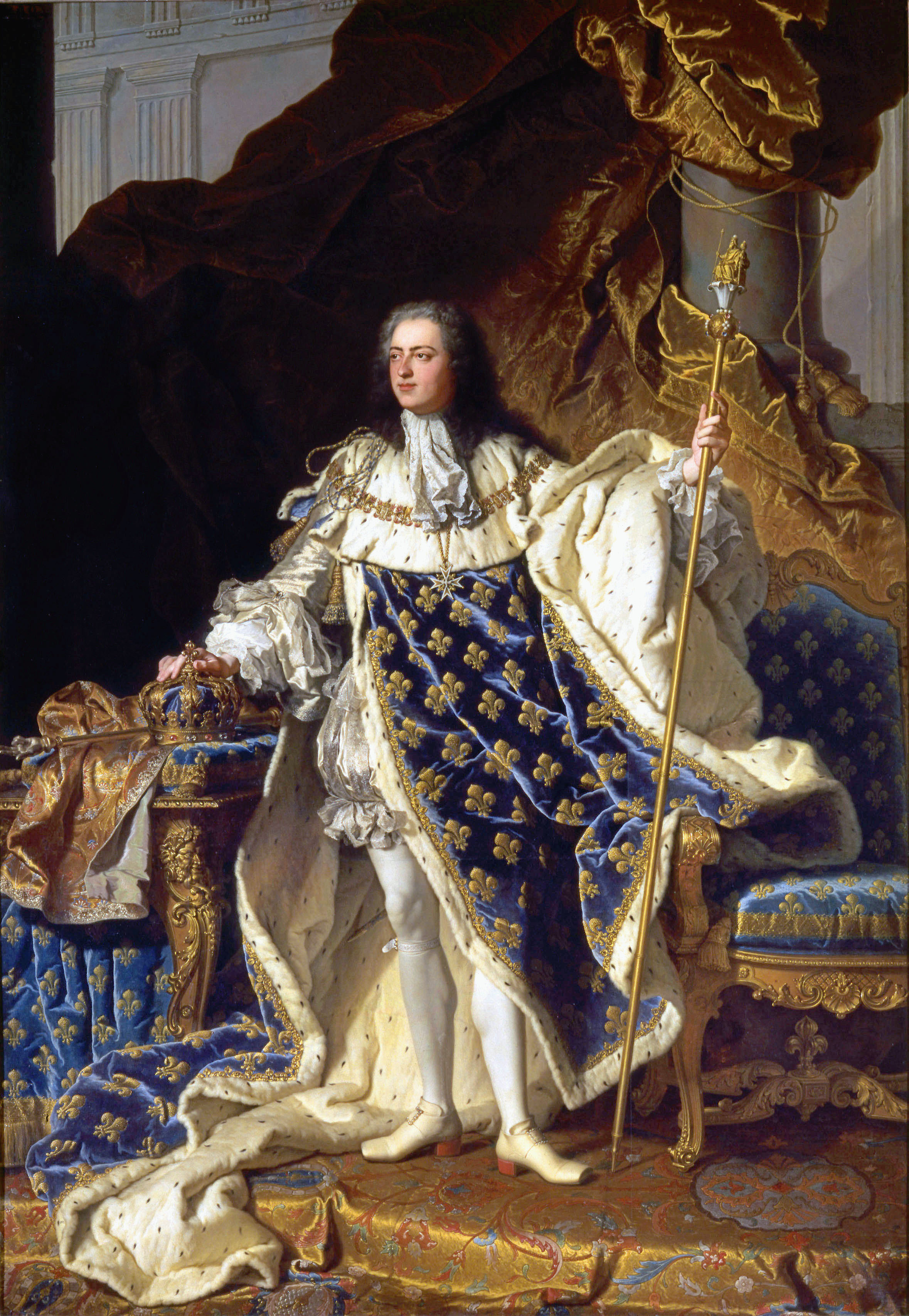
Louis XV in coronation robes (1730)

In the first years of his governance, Fleury and his foreign minister Germain Louis Chauvelin sought to maintain the peace by maintaining the French alliance with Great Britain, despite their colonial rivalry in North America and the West Indies. They also rebuilt the alliance with Spain, which had been shaken by the anger of the Spanish King when Louis refused to marry the Spanish infanta. The birth of the king's male heir in 1729 dispelled the risks of a succession crisis in France. However, new powers were emerging on the European stage, particularly Russia under Peter the Great and his successor, Catherine. The Habsburg monarchy under Charles VI was assembling a scattered but impressive empire as far as Serbia in southeastern Europe with territories taken from the Ottoman Empire, and from Spain, acquiring the Austrian Netherlands, Milan and the Kingdom of Naples.

A new coalition against France began to assemble in eastern Europe, sealed by a defensive treaty signed on 6 August 1726 between Prussia, Russia and Austria. In 1732 the coalition came into direct conflict with France over the succession to the Polish throne. The King of Poland and Elector of Saxony, Augustus II, was dying, and the favoured candidate to succeed him was Stanisław Leszczyński, the father of the Queen of France. In the same year Russia, Prussia and Austria signed a secret agreement to exclude Stanislaus from the throne, and put forward another candidate, Augustus III, son of the deceased Polish king. The death of Augustus on 1 February 1733, with two heirs claiming the throne, sparked the War of the Polish Succession. Stanislaus traveled to Warsaw, where he was elected and crowned on 12 September. Empress Anna of Russia immediately marched her regiments into Poland to support her candidate. Stanislaus was forced to flee to the fortified port of Danzig, while on 5 October Augustus III was crowned in Warsaw.

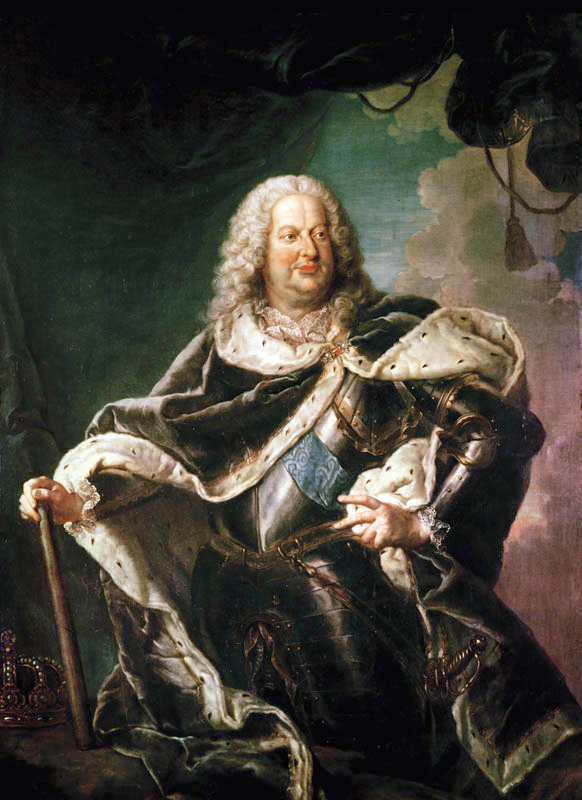
Stanisław Leszczyński, father-in-law of Louis XV and briefly King of Poland

Cardinal Fleury responded with a carefully orchestrated campaign of diplomacy. He first won assurances from Britain and Holland that they would not interfere in the war, while lining up alliances with Spain and Charles Emmanuel III of Sardinia in exchange for pieces of the Habsburg monarchy. On 10 October 1733, Louis formally declared war against Austria. A French army occupied the Duchy of Lorraine, while another crossed the Alps and captured Milan on 3 November, handing it over to the King of Sardinia. Fleury was less energetic in his actions to restore the Polish throne to Stanislaus, who was blockaded by the Russian navy and army in Danzig. Instead of sending the largest part of the French fleet from its station off Copenhagen to Danzig, he ordered it to return to Brest and sent only a small squadron with two thousand soldiers, which after a fierce action was sunk by the Russians. On 3 July Stanislaus was forced to flee again, in disguise, to Prussia, where he became the guest of King Frederick William I of Prussia in the castle of Königsberg.

To bring the war to an end, Fleury and Charles VI negotiated an ingenious diplomatic solution. Francis III, Duke of Lorraine, left Lorraine for Vienna, where he married Maria Theresa, the heir presumptive to the Habsburg thrones. The vacant throne of Lorraine was to be occupied by Stanislaus, who abandoned his claim to the Polish throne. Upon the death of Stanislaus, the Duchy of Lorraine and Bar would become part of France. Francis, as the future emperor, would be compensated for the loss of Lorraine by the granting of the Grand Duchy of Tuscany. The King of Sardinia would be compensated with certain territories in Lombardy. The marriage of Francis of Lorraine and Maria Theresa took place in 1736, and the other exchanges took place in turn. With the death of Stanislaus in 1766, Lorraine and the neighboring Duchy of Bar became part of France.

In September 1739, Fleury scored another diplomatic success. France's mediation in the war between the Holy Roman Empire and the Ottoman Empire led to the Treaty of Belgrade (September 1739), which favoured the Ottoman Empire, beneficiary of a Franco-Ottoman alliance against the Habsburgs since the early 16th century. As a result, the Ottoman Empire in 1740 renewed the French capitulations, which marked the supremacy of French trade in the Middle East. With these successes, Louis XV's prestige reached its highest point. In 1740 Frederick William I of Prussia declared "Since the Treaty of Vienna France is the arbiter of Europe."

=== War of the Austrian Succession ===
On 29 October 1740, a courier brought the news to the King, who was hunting in Fontainebleau, that the Emperor Charles VI was dead, and his daughter Maria Theresa was set to succeed him. After two days of reflection, Louis declared, "In these circumstances, I don't want to get involved at all. I will remain with my hands in my pockets, unless of course they want to elect a Protestant emperor." This attitude did not please France's allies, who saw an opportunity to take parts of the Habsburg empire, or Louis's generals, who for a century had won glory fighting Austria. The King in Prussia had died on 31 May and was succeeded by his son Frederick the Great, a military genius with ambitions to expand Prussia's borders. The Elector Charles Albert of Bavaria, supported by Frederick, challenged the succession of Maria Theresa, and on 17 December 1740 Frederick invaded the Austrian province of Silesia. The elderly Cardinal Fleury had too little energy left to oppose this war.

Fleury sent his highest ranking general, Charles Louis Auguste Fouquet, duc de Belle-Isle, the Maréchal de Belle-Isle, the grandson of Nicolas Fouquet, the famous disgraced controller of finances of Louis XIV, as his ambassador to the Diet of Frankfurt, with instructions to avoid a war by supporting the candidacy of the Elector of Bavaria to the Austrian throne. Instead, the Maréchal, who detested the Austrians, made an agreement to join with the Prussians against Austria, and the war began. French and Bavarian armies quickly captured Linz and laid siege to Prague. On 10 April 1741 Frederick won a major victory over the Austrians at the Battle of Mollwitz. On 18 May, Fleury assembled a new alliance combining France, Prussia, Spain and Bavaria, later joined by Poland and Sardinia. However, in 1742, the balance of the war shifted against France. The German-born British King, George II, who was also the Elector of Hanover, joined the war on the side of Austria and personally took charge of his soldiers fighting the French in Germany. Maria Theresa's Hungarian army recaptured Linz and marched into Bavaria as far as Munich. In June, Frederick of Prussia withdrew from the alliance with France, after gaining the Duchies of Silesia from the Austrians. Belleville had to abandon Prague, with a loss of eight thousand men. For seven years, France was engaged in a costly war with constantly shifting alliances. Orry, the superintendent of French finance, was forced to reinstate the highly unpopular dixieme tax to fund the war. Cardinal de Fleury did not live to see the end of the conflict; he died on 29 January 1743, and thereafter Louis ruled alone.

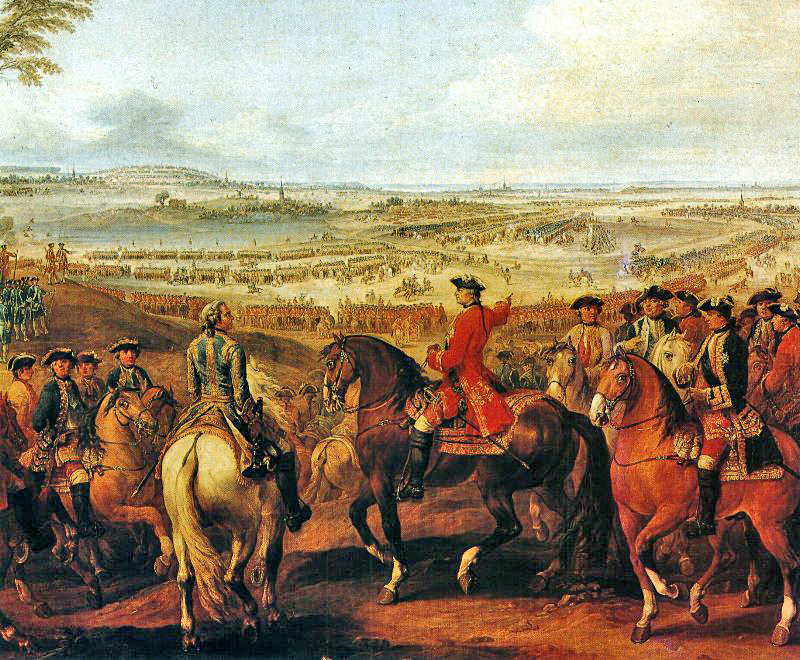
Louis XV and Maurice de Saxe at the Battle of Lauffeldt (2 July 1747)

The war in Germany was not going well; the French and Bavarian forces were faced with the combined armies of Austria, Saxony, Holland, Sardinia and Hanover. The army of the Duke of Noailles was defeated by a force of British, Hessian and Hanover soldiers led by George II at the Battle of Dettingen, and in September French forces were compelled to abandon Germany.

In 1744, the Austrian Netherlands became the primary battlefield of the war, and the French position began to improve. Frederick the Great decided to rejoin the war on the French side. Louis XV left Versailles to lead his armies in the Netherlands in person, and French field command was given to the German-born Maréchal Maurice de Saxe, a highly competent general. At the Battle of Fontenoy on 11 May 1745, Louis, accompanied by his young son the Dauphin, came under fire for the first time and witnessed a French victory over combined British, Dutch and Austrian forces. When the Dauphin became excited at the sight of so many dead enemy soldiers, the King told him, "You see what a victory costs. The blood of our enemies is still the blood of men. The true glory is to spare it." Saxe went on to win further victories at Rocoux (1746) and Lauffeld (1747). In 1746 French forces besieged and occupied Brussels, which Louis entered in triumph. The King gave de Saxe the Chateau de Chambord in the Loire Valley as a reward for his victories.

== Personal government (1743–1757) ==
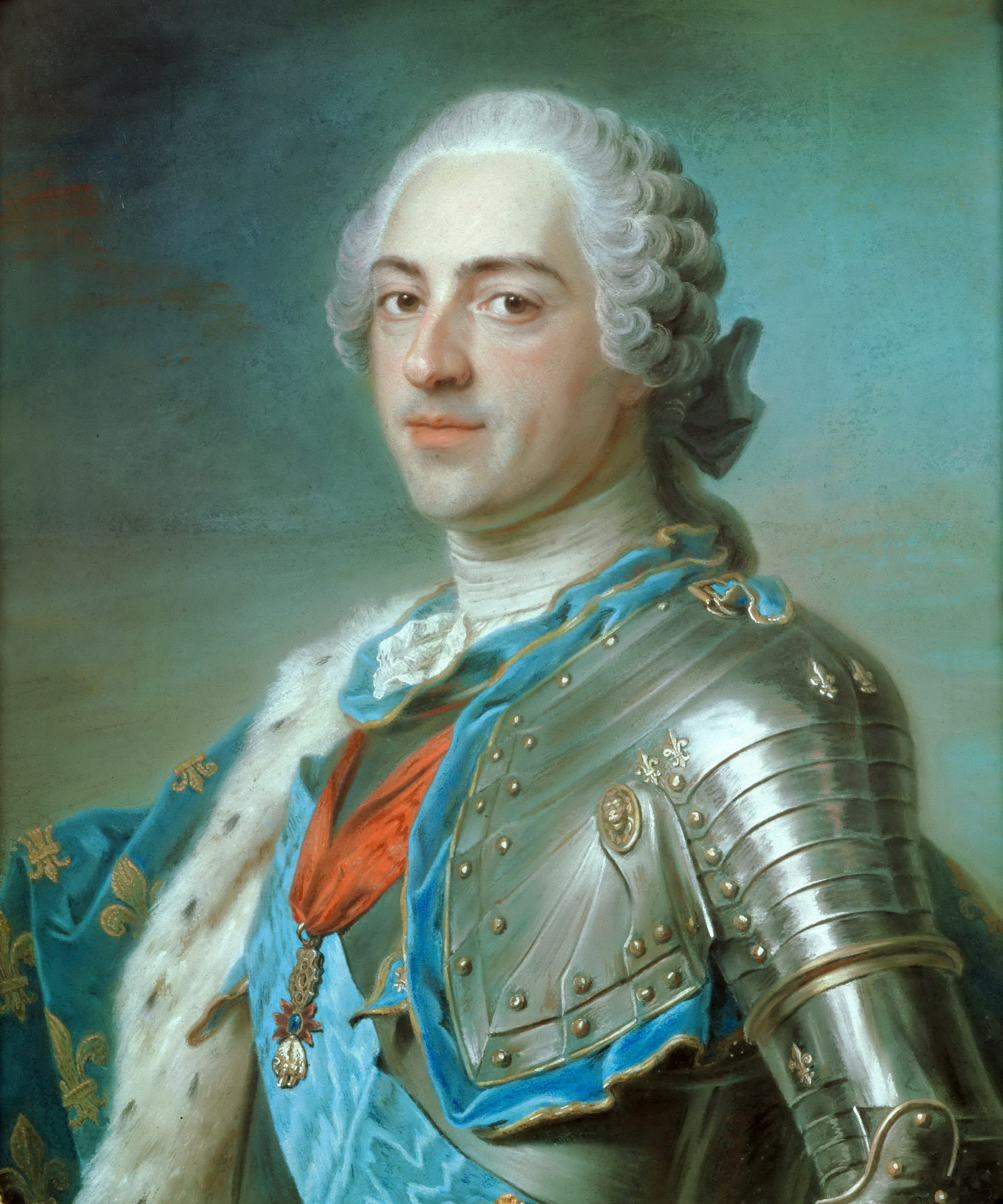
Louis XV, portrait by Maurice-Quentin de La Tour (1748)

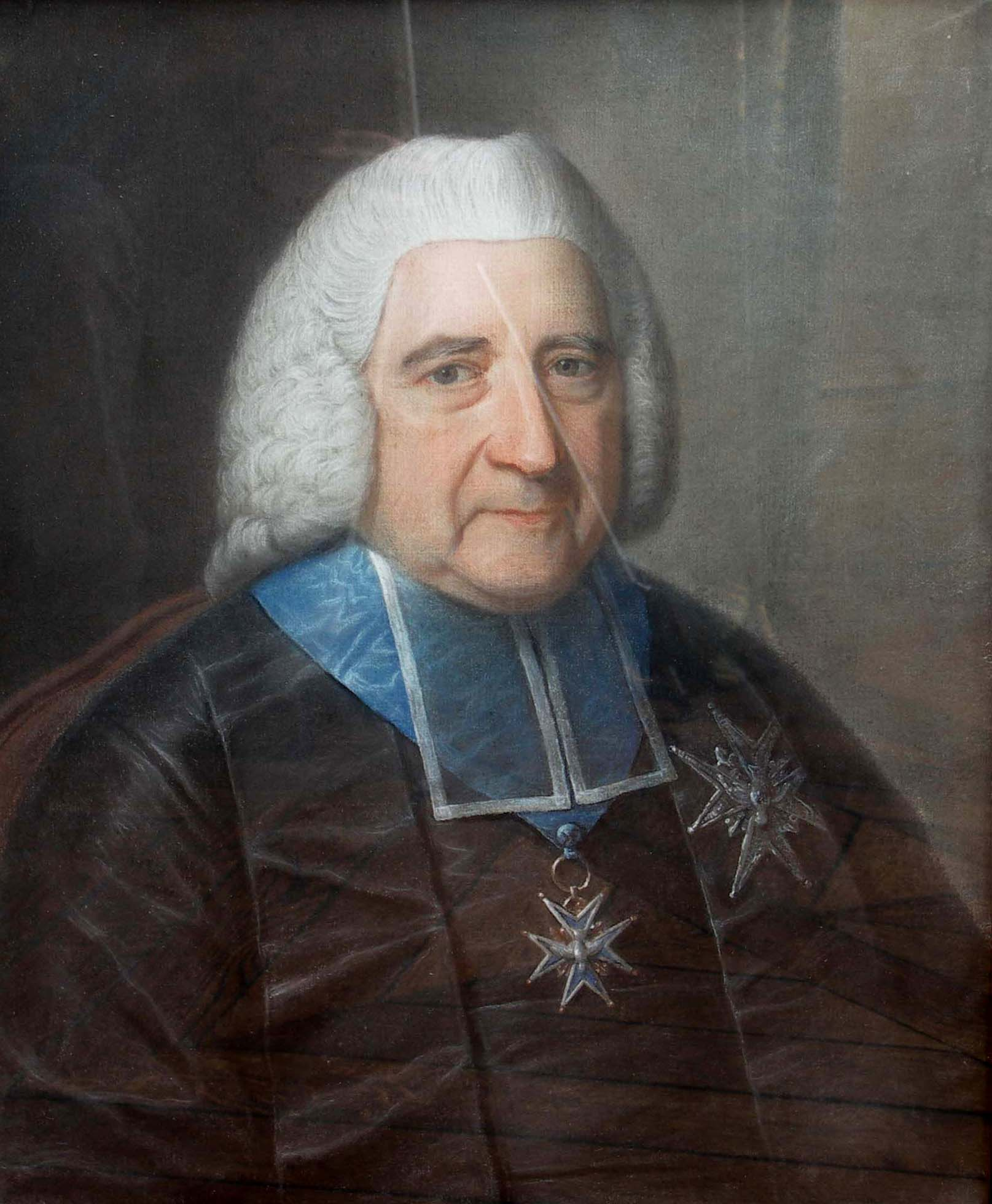
Finance minister Jean Baptiste de Machault D'Arnouville, who attempted to reform the French tax system

After Fleury's death in January 1743, his war minister, the Duke of Noailles, showed the King a letter that Louis XIV had written to his grandson, Philip V of Spain; it counseled: "Don't allow yourself to be governed; be the master. Never have a favorite or a prime minister. Listen, consult your Council, but decide yourself. God, who made you King, will give you all the guidance you need, as long as you have good intentions." Louis followed this advice and decided to govern without a prime minister. Two of his ministers took the most prominent positions in his government; the finance minister, Jean Baptiste de Machault D'Arnouville, and the minister of the armies, Comte d'Argenson.

With the end of the war, Louis decided to take the opportunity to reduce the debt and modernize the system of taxation of the Kingdom. The package of reforms was put together by his finance minister D'Arnouville and was approved by the King and presented in two decrees issued in May 1749. The first measure was an issue of bonds, paying five percent interest, to pay off the 36 million livres of debt caused by the cost of the war. This new measure was an immediate success. The second measure was the abolition of the dixième, a tax of ten percent of revenue, which had been created to finance the war, and its replacement by the vingtième, a tax of five percent on net revenue, which, unlike the dixième, taxed the income of all French citizens, including for the first time the income from the property of the clergy and the nobility.

While the new tax was supported by many, including Voltaire, it met immediate and fierce resistance from both the nobility and the church. When on 5 May 1749 it was presented for formal registration to the Parlement of Paris, the assembly composed of high nobles and wealthy Parisians who had purchased seats, it was rejected by a vote of one hundred and six to forty nine; the majority asked for more time to consider the project. The King responded by demanding immediate registration, which the Parlement reluctantly granted on 19 May. Resistance to the new measures grew with the church and in the provinces, which had their own parlements. While the Parlements of Burgundy, Provence and Artois bowed to the King's demands, Brittany and Languedoc refused. The royal government closed down the Parlement of Brittany, ordered the members of the Parlement of Languedoc to return to their estates and parishes, and took direct control of the Provence.

Within Paris, the battle between the King and Parlement was fought over the status of the Hôpital Général, a semi-religious organization which operated six different hospitals and shelters in Paris, with a staff of some five thousand persons. Many of the hospital staff and officials were Jansenists, while the board of directors of the hospital included many prominent members of the Parlement of Paris. In 1749, the King decided to purge the hospital of Jansenists and corruption, appointed a new "Supérieure" against the will of the administrators, who resigned, then appointed four temporary administrators, and asked the First President of the Parlement of Paris, René Nicolas Charles Augustin de Maupeou, to implement his decree for the reorganization of the hospital. De Maupeou refused to carry out the decree without the authorization of the Parlement, and the Parlement, without taking any action, went on vacation. On 20 November, when the Parlement returned, the King again summoned de Maupeou for an audience and again demanded action without delay. This time the Parlement members met but refused to discuss the Hospital. On 28 January 1752, the King instructed the Grand Council to change the administration of the Hospital without the approval of the Parlement. Voltaire, describing the affair, wrote, "Never before has such a small affair caused such a great emotion of the spirit." It was the first overt disobedience of the legislature against the King, and one of the first signs that the Parlement believed it, not the King, was the legitimate source of laws in the nation.

The King's original plans to tax the church also ran into difficulty. A royal decree ordered all the clergy to submit a declaration of their revenue by 17 February 1751, but that day passed without any declarations given. Instead it became known that the King had quietly issued a new decree in December 1750, canceling the tax and relying again, entirely, on the "don gratuit", the voluntary donation by the church of 1,500,000 livres. Under the new decree, instead of a tax, the church would each year collect a comparable sum and donate it freely to the government. His support for the church came both from the teachings of his tutor, Cardinal Fleury, and his gratitude to Archbishop de Beaumont, who defended him against the attacks of the Jansenists and the criticisms of the Parlement, and the Archbishop's tolerance of the King's own personal life and mistresses.

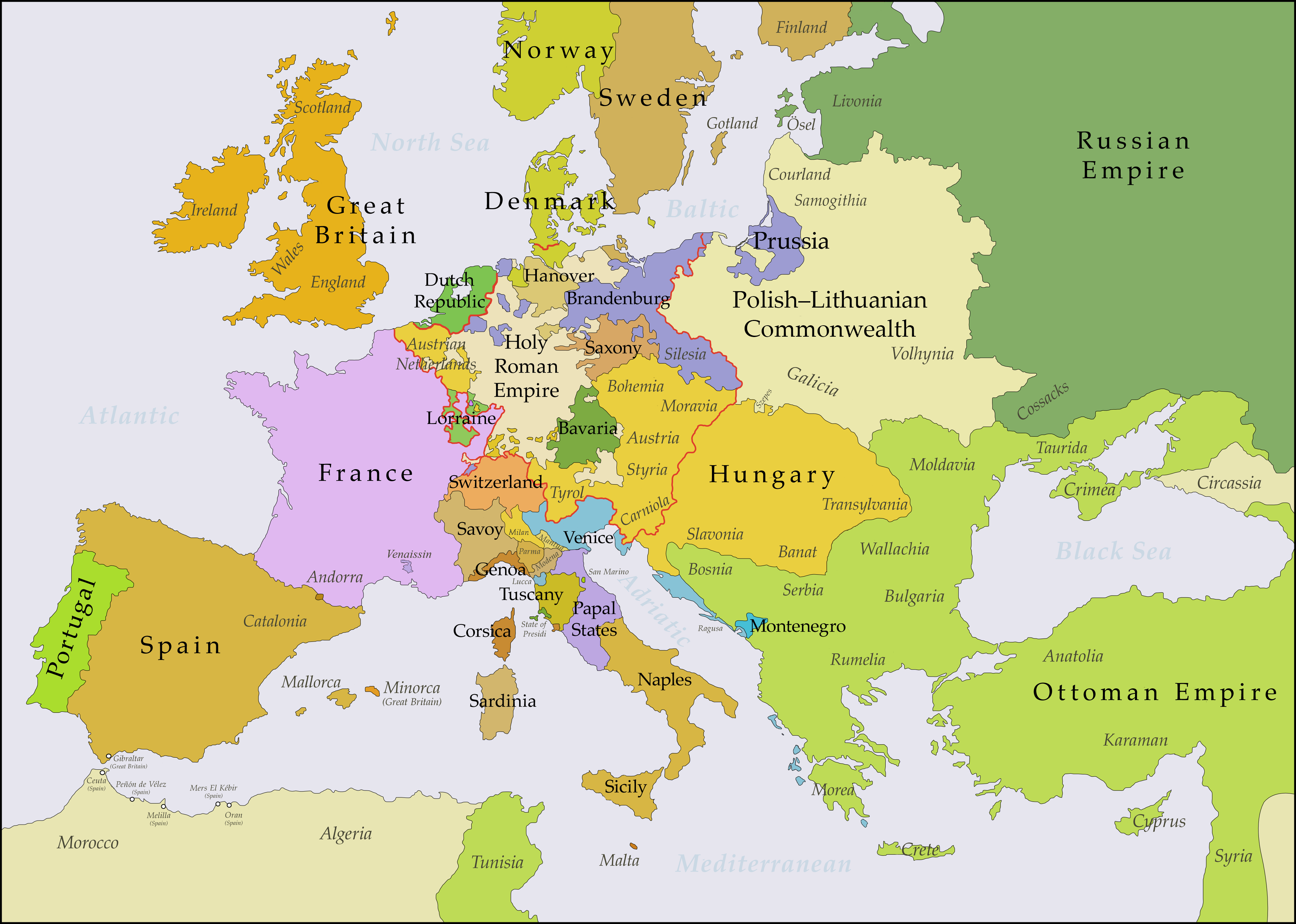
Europe in the years after the Treaty of Aix-la-Chapelle in 1748

Despite the French victories, the war dragged on both in the Netherlands and in Italy, where Maréchal Belle-Isle was besieging the Austrians in Genoa. By the summer of 1747 France occupied the entire Austrian Netherlands (modern-day Belgium). In March 1748, Louis proposed a conference in Aix-la-Chapelle to bring the war to an end. The process was advanced by the capture of Maastricht by the Maréchal de Saxe on 10 April 1748. Britain, pressed by the threat of a French invasion of the rest of the Netherlands, urged a quick settlement, despite objections from Austria and Sardinia. The Treaty was quickly negotiated and signed by all the parties in September and October 1748. Louis was also eager for a quick settlement, because the naval war with Britain was extremely costly to French maritime trade. The proposition of Louis was surprisingly generous; in the Treaty of Aix-la-Chapelle, Louis offered to return all of the territories he had conquered in the Netherlands to the Austrians, Maastricht to the Dutch, Nice and Savoy to the Sardinians, and Madras in India to the English. The Austrians would give the Duchy of Parma and some other territory to the Spanish Infante, Philip, while Britain would return to France Louisbourg and the island of Cape Breton. France also agreed to expel the Stuart pretender Charles Edward Stuart from its territory.

The end of the war had caused celebration in Paris, but the publication of the details of the treaty on 14 January 1749 caused dismay and anger. The Stuart pretender Charles Edward Stuart refused to leave Paris and was acclaimed by the Parisians. He was finally arrested on 10 December 1748, and transported by force to Switzerland. The French military commanders, including de Saxe, were furious about giving up the Austrian Netherlands. The King's defense of his action was practical: he did not want the Netherlands to be a permanent source of contention between France and other powers; he also felt that France had already reached its proper borders, and it was better to cultivate its prosperity rather than make it larger. His basis was also religious; he had been taught by Fleury that the Seventh Commandment forbade taking the property of others by fraud or violence. Louis often cited a Latin maxim declaring, "if anyone who asks by what means he can best defend a kingdom, the answer is, by never wishing to augment it." He also received support from Voltaire, who wrote, "It seems better, and even more useful for the court of France to think about the happiness of its allies, rather than to be given two or three Flemish towns which would have been the eternal object of jealousy." Louis lacked the communicative skills to explain his decision to the French public, and further, did not see any need to do so. The news that the King had returned the Southern Netherlands to Austria was met with disbelief and bitterness. The French obtained so little of what they had fought for that they adopted the expressions Bête comme la paix ("Stupid as the peace") and Travailler pour le roi de Prusse ("To work for the king of Prussia", i.e. working for nothing).

=== First mistresses ===
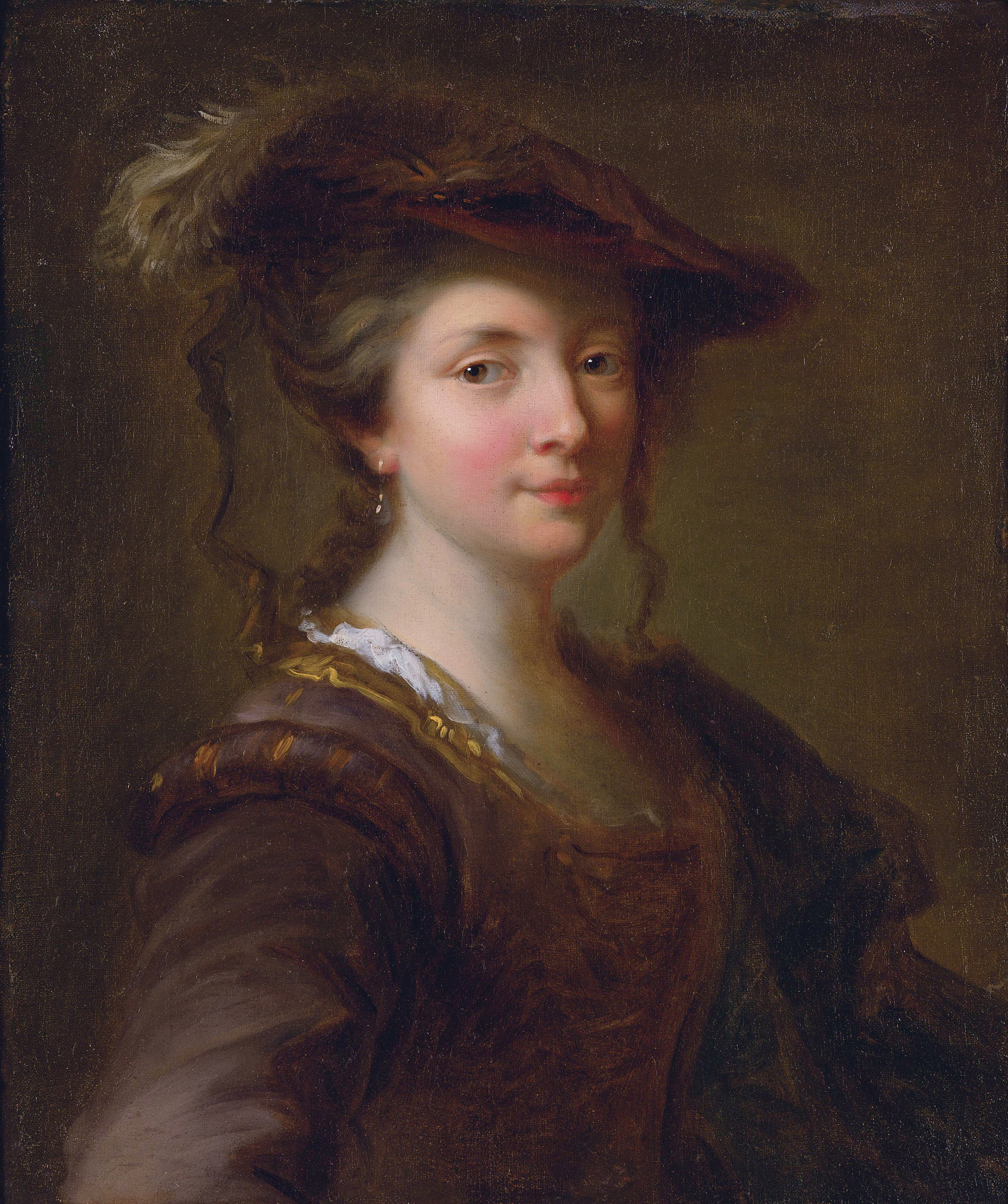
Purported portrait of Louise Julie de Mailly, by Alexis Grimou

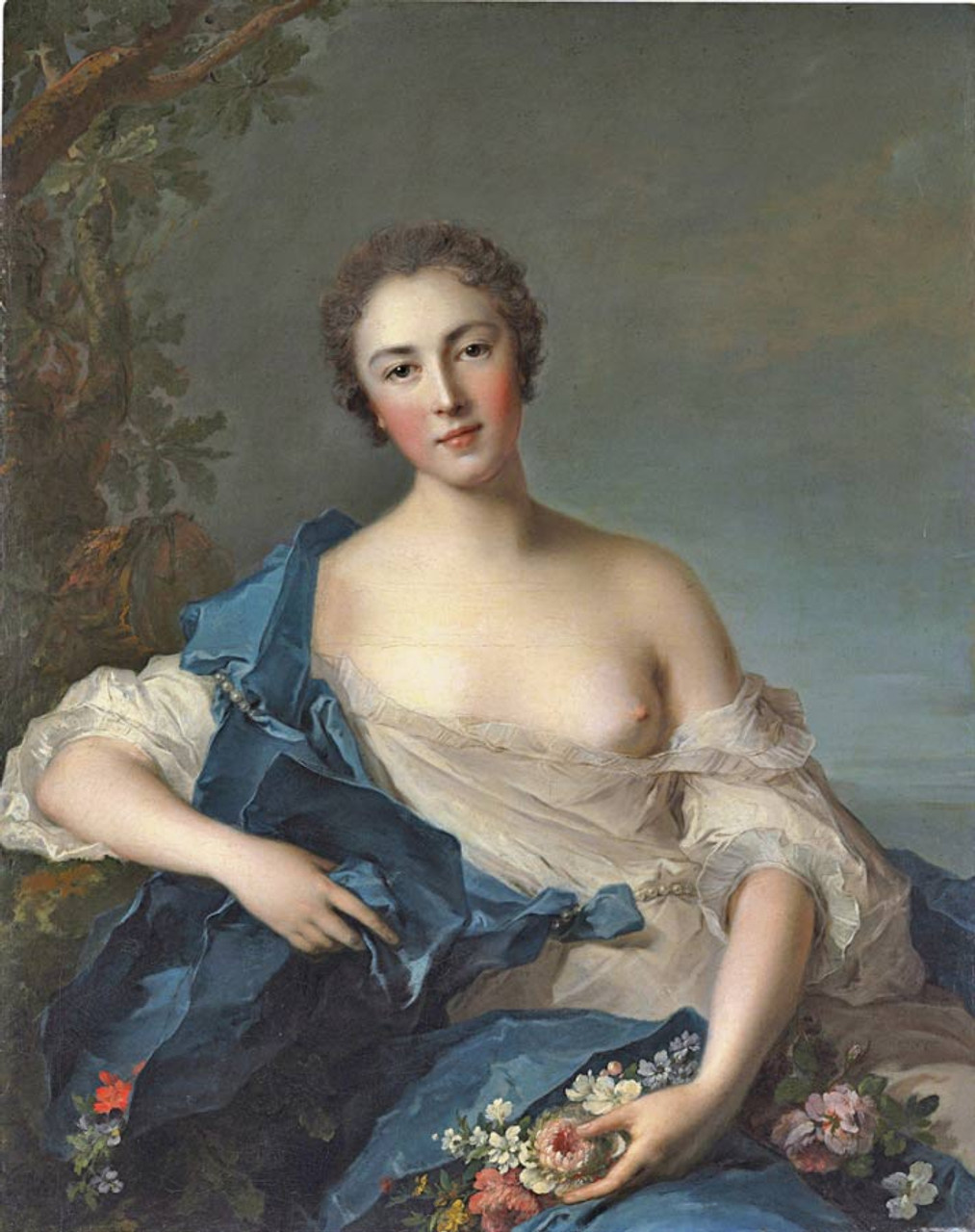
Pauline Félicité de Mailly-Nesle, marquise de Vintimille, by Jean-Marc Nattier

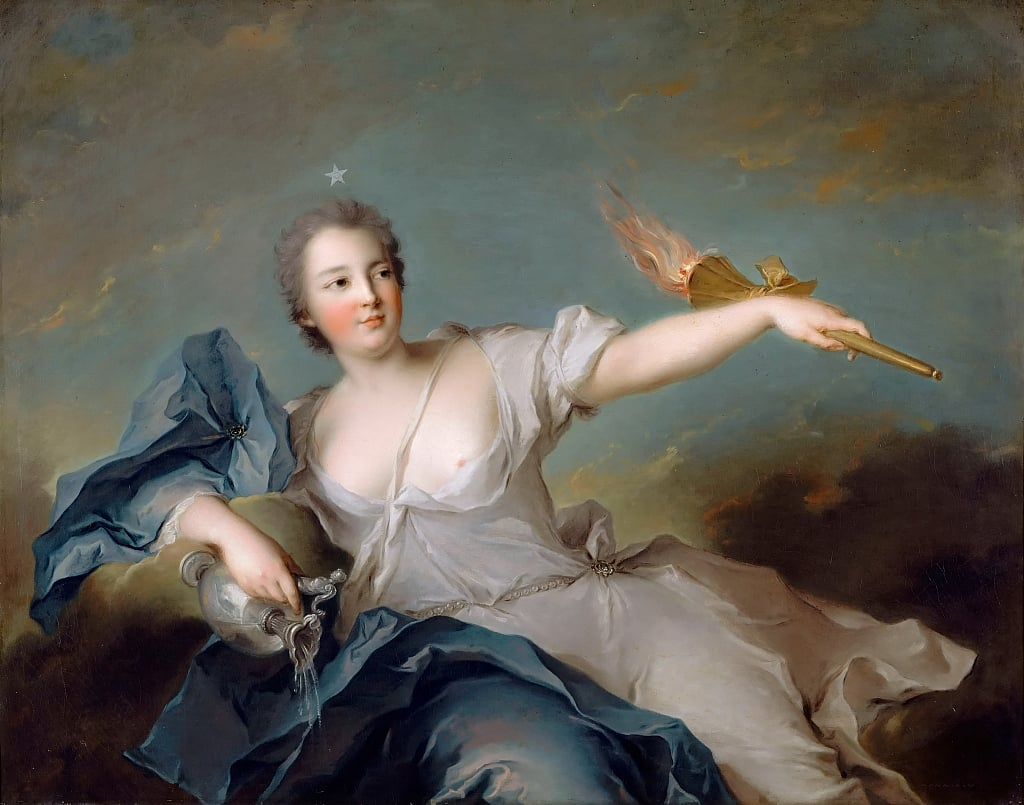
Marie Anne de Mailly-Nesle by Jean-Marc Nattier

==== The de Mailly-Nesle sisters ====
Louis had been very much in love with the Queen, and they were inseparable in the early years of his reign, but as his family grew, and the Queen was constantly pregnant or exhausted by her maternities, he began to look elsewhere. He first became attached to one of the ladies of the Queen's court, Louise Julie de Mailly, who was the same age as he and from an ancient noble family. Without courtship or ceremony, he made her his mistress, and raised her to the rank of Duchess. The Duke of Luynes commented on the King's behavior: "The King loves women, and yet there is absolutely no gallantry in his spirit." In 1738, after the Queen lost an unborn child, her doctors forbade her to have relations with the King for a time. The King was offended by her refusal and thereafter never shared her bed. Acknowledging that he was committing adultery, Louis refused thereafter to go to confession and to take the sacrament. The Cardinal de Fleury tried to persuade him to confess and to give up his mistress, but without success.

In 1738, the King turned his attentions to the sister of Louise Julie, Pauline Félicité de Mailly. Pauline Félicité became pregnant in 1740, allegedly by the King, and subsequently died during childbirth; the child came to be known as "Demi-Louis" due to his visual resemblance to his father who took care of his financial needs but gave him little attention. (Note: "But the king chose that the child should be baptized as the son of M. de Vintimille, and it was so done by his express order. The Archbishop of Paris and the Marquis du Luc, uncle and father of M. de Yintimille came, as good politicians, to see the mother and acknowledge the child") Pauline Félicité's death caused the King to go into mourning and for a time he turned to religion for consolation. When the King finally recovered his spirits, Louise Julie introduced the King to her youngest sister, Marie Anne de Mailly. The King was immediately attracted to Marie Anne, however she insisted that he expel her older sister from the Court before she would become his mistress. The King gave in, and on 4 October 1742, Marie Anne was named a Lady of the Court of the Queen, and a month later the King ordered her older sister to leave the Court and to live in Paris. The King made his new mistress the Duchess of Châteauroux. The King's relationships with the sisters became a subject of gossip in the court and in Paris, where a popular comic poem was recited, ending: "Choosing an entire family – is that being unfaithful, or constant?"

In June 1744, the King left Versailles in order to take personal command of his armies fighting in the War of the Austrian Succession. This otherwise popular move was marred by the King's indiscreet decision to bring along Marie Anne. When Marie Anne visited the King in Metz in August 1744 she was accompanied by her sister Diane Adélaïde de Mailly. While an amiable companion, Marie Anne did not consider her simple sister to be much of a rival, however it was rumored at the time that one of the methods by which Marie Anne kept the interest of the king was to periodically offer him a ménage à trois with Diane Adélaïde. These widespread rumors made the sisters' visit to the King in Metz a national scandal and during their notorious visit the King suddenly fell gravely ill. Death appeared imminent, yet the King's chaplain, François de Fitz-James, refused him absolution unless he renounced his mistress, which he did. Marie Anne left The Court and after the King recovered he made a triumphal entry into Paris. On 25 November, Minister Maurepas was obliged to recall Marie Anne to Versailles, but she soon fell sick with convulsive pains and died on 8 December 1744. Following her death the King consoled himself with Diane Adélaïde until he met Madame de Pompadour in 1745.

The King's adultery confession, which was distributed publicly, embarrassed him and tarnished the prestige of the monarchy. Although Louis XV's recovery earned him the epithet "well-beloved" from a public relieved by his survival, the events at Metz diminished his standing. The military successes of the War of the Austrian Succession inclined the French public to overlook Louis' adulteries, but after 1748, in the wake of the anger over the terms of the Treaty of Aix-la-Chapelle, pamphlets against the king's mistresses were widely distributed and read.

=== Second mistress ===
==== Madame de Pompadour ====
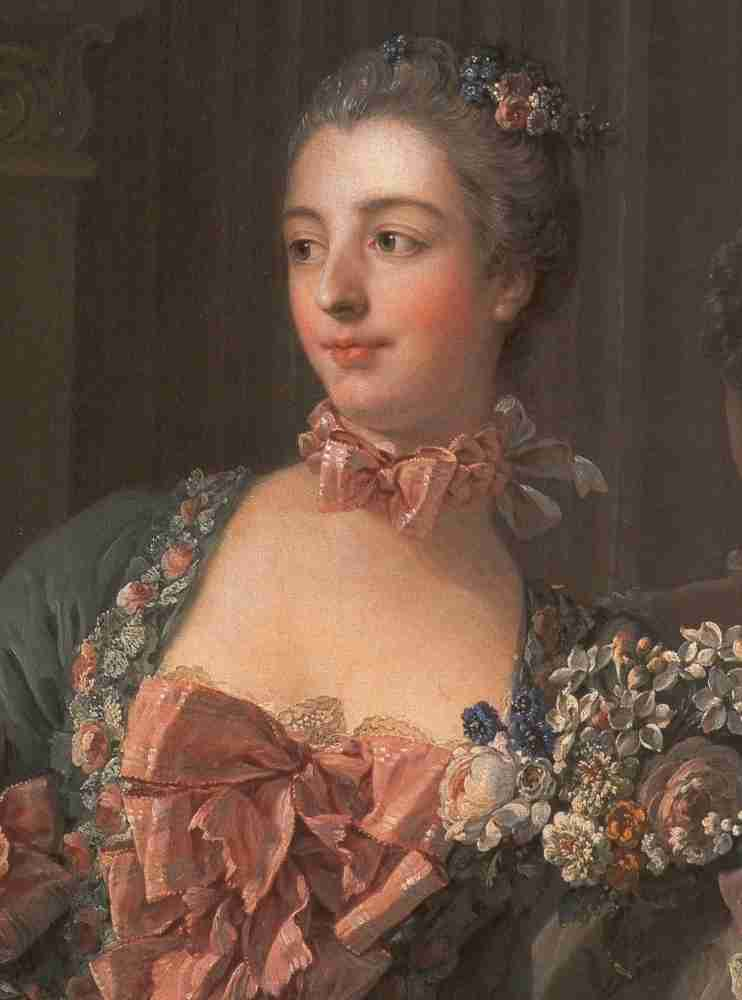
Madame de Pompadour

Jeanne-Antoinette Poisson, better known as Madame de Pompadour, was the most famous and influential of the mistresses of Louis XV. She was the illegitimate daughter of a Paris fermier-general, and was married to a banker, Charles Guillaume Lenormant d'Étoiles. She was noticed by the King following one of his hunts, and formally met him at a costume ball celebrating carnival in 1745. By July, she was the King's mistress and was formally given the title of the Marquise de Pompadour. For the next twenty years, she was the King's confidante and advisor, helping him choose or demote ministers. Her opinions led to the downfall of some very competent ministers, including Machault d'Aurnouville and the Marquis d'Argenson, and to the promotion of a number of incompetent military commanders. Her most successful choice was the promotion of the Duke de Choiseul, who became one of the King's most effective ministers. She ceased all sexual intimacy with the King by 1750, but remained his closest advisor and titular mistress. She was promoted to Duchess in 1752, and Dame of the Queen's Palace in 1756, and was an important patron of music and the arts, as well as religious establishments. She remained close to the King until her death in 1764. He was devastated, and remained in seclusion for several weeks after she died.

=== Beginning of the Seven Years' War ===
The peace achieved by Louis with the Treaty of Aix-la-Chapelle lasted only seven years. At the end of August 1755, Maria Theresa, the Empress of Austria, discreetly wrote a letter to Louis XV, which was passed by the Austrian ambassador in Paris to Madame de Pompadour for delivery to the King. She proposed a secret alliance between Austria and France, to meet the threats of the growing power of Prussia, which was still formally an ally of France, and Britain.

Map of New France (blue color) in 1750, before the French and Indian War (1754 to 1763), that was part of the Seven Years' War.

In the New World, conflict had already begun between Great Britain and France. New France was at an enormous demographic disadvantage vis-à-vis its British counterparts; there were about 70,000 French colonists spread over a territory from the St. Lawrence River to the Great Lakes and extending down the Ohio and Mississippi River valleys to Louisiana, compared with a population of one million settlers in the British 13 Colonies. To defend its territories, France had constructed Fort Duquesne to defend its frontier against the indigenous Americans; Britain sent the young George Washington with a small force to construct his own fortification, Fort Necessity, nearby. In 1754, after the killing of French envoy, Joseph Coulon de Jumonville, the French sent reinforcements and compelled Washington and his men to withdraw.

The undeclared French and Indian War followed, with British and French colonies in North America engaging in open conflict. By the end of 1755, British ships had captured over 300 French merchantmen. In January 1756, Louis sent an ultimatum to London, which was rejected by the British government. A few months later, on 16 January 1756, Frederick the Great of Prussia signed the Treaty of Westminster, allying himself with Britain. Louis responded immediately on 1 May 1756 by sealing a formal defensive treaty with Austria, the first Treaty of Versailles, offering to defend Austria in case of a Prussian attack – a reversal of France's historic conflict with Austria.

Louis declared war on Great Britain on 9 June 1756, confident of success. The French navy quickly defeated a British fleet in the Mediterranean and captured Minorca from Britain. Meanwhile, the French army greatly outnumbered its British and Prussian counterparts on the continent, and after some fighting France signed the Convention of Klosterzeven with the Duke of Cumberland, which resulted in French troops occupying parts of Hanover and the Hanoverians withdrawing from the conflict entirely. Another French army had already invaded Saxony and Hanover, the ancestral home of George II. However, the best French commander, Maurice de Saxe, had died two years after the War of the Austrian Succession, and his successors, the Prince de Soubise, the Duke D'Estrees and the Duke de Broglie detested each other, and were rarely willing to cooperate.

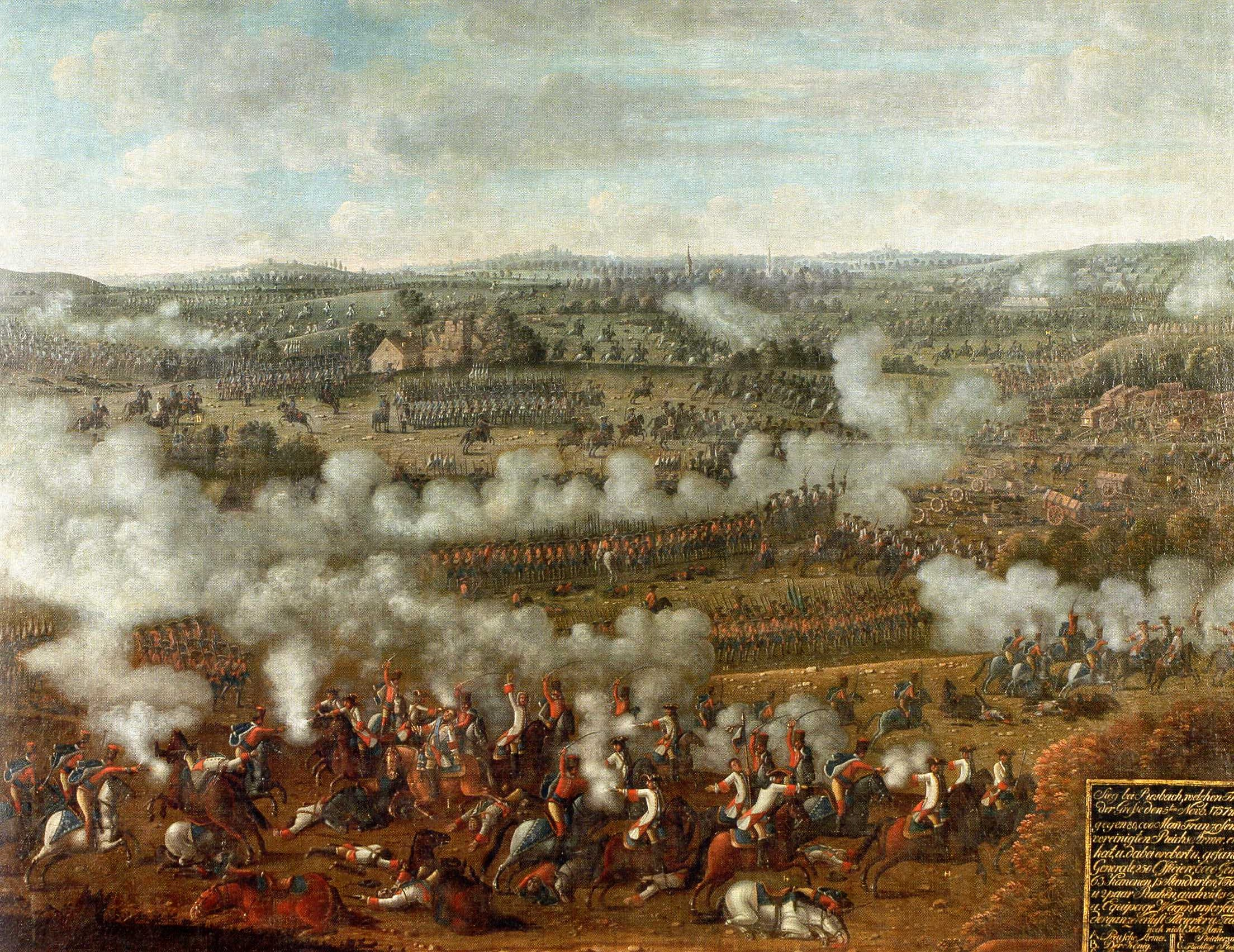
Frederick the Great defeats the French army at the Battle of Rossbach (5 November 1755)

In August Frederick of Prussia made a lightning strike into Saxony and on 5 November 1757, though outnumbered by the French nearly two to one, decisively defeated the army of the Prince de Soubise at the Battle of Rossbach. The new British Prime Minister, William Pitt, named a new commander, Duke Ferdinand of Brunswick-Wolfenbüttel, and the French armies were gradually pushed back to the Rhine, and defeated again at the Battle of Krefeld on 23 June. Thereafter, Britain and Prussia held the upper hand, tying down the French army in the German states along the Rhine.

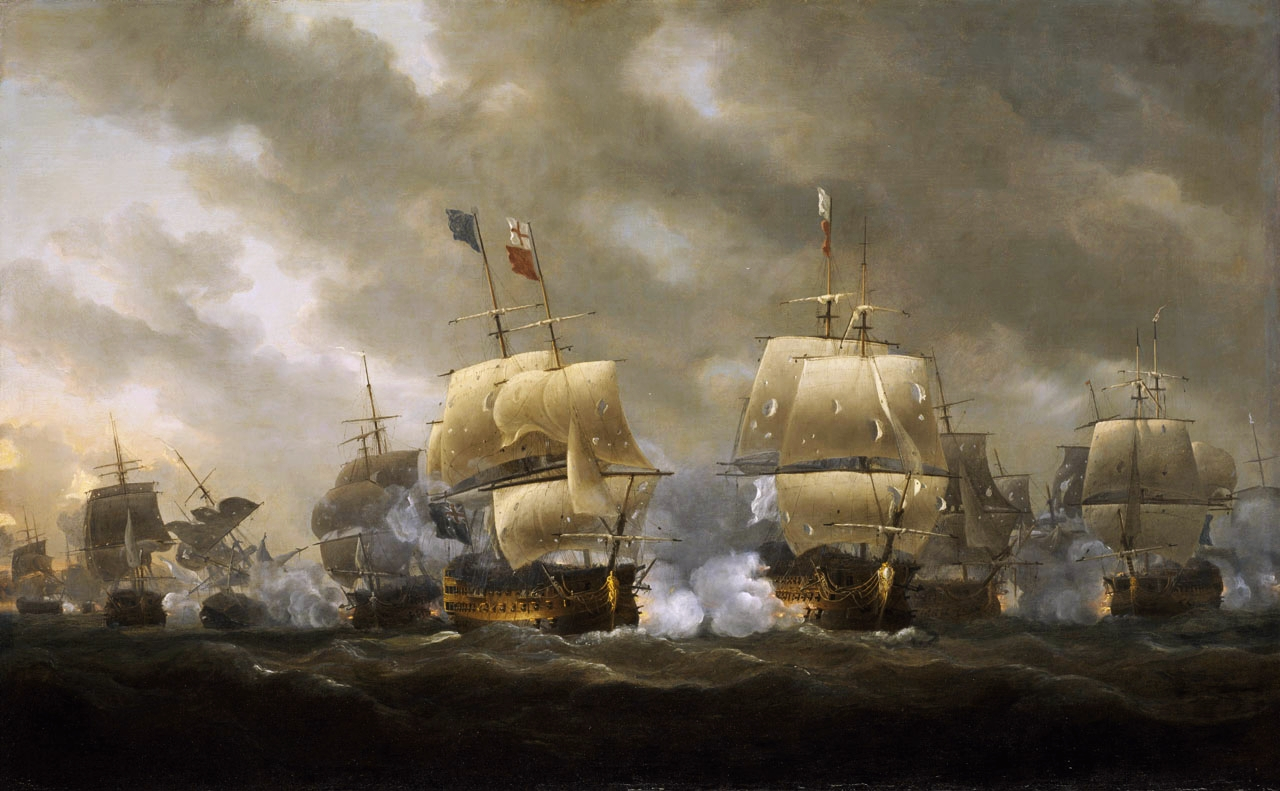
The British victory at the Battle of Quiberon Bay (20 November 1759) ended Louis's hopes of invading England

British naval supremacy prevented France from reinforcing its colonies overseas, and British naval squadrons raided the French coast at Cancale and Le Havre and landed on the Ile d'Aix and Le Havre. In 1759 the British attacked Martinique and Guadeloupe in the French West Indies, and captured Port Louis and Quebec. A series of French naval defeats forced Louis to abandon plans for invasion of Britain. In India, the French colony at Pondicherry was besieged by the British, and surrendered the following year. On 8 September 1760, Montreal surrendered, bringing to an end French rule in Canada. Martinique fell to the British in 1762.

=== Assassination attempt ===
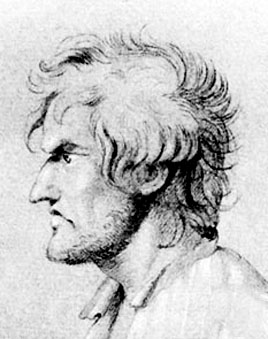
Robert-François Damiens, by Ange-Jacques Gabriel (1757)

On 5 January 1757, as the King was getting into his carriage in the courtyard of the Grand Trianon Versailles, a demented man, Robert-François Damiens, pushed through the King's guards and attacked the King, stabbing him in the side with a small knife. The King's guards seized Damiens, and the King ordered them to hold him but not harm him. The King walked up the steps to his rooms at the Trianon, where he found he was bleeding profusely. He summoned his doctor and a priest, and then fainted. Louis was saved from greater harm by the thickness of the winter clothing he was wearing. When the news reached Paris, anxious crowds gathered in the streets. The Pope, the Archduchess of Austria, and King George II, with whom France was at war, sent messages hoping for his swift recovery. Damiens was tortured to see if he had accomplices, and was tried before the Parlement of Paris, which had been the most vocal critic of the King. The Parlement demonstrated its loyalty to the King by sentencing Damiens to the most severe possible penalty. On 28–29 March 1757 Damiens was executed on the Place de Grève in Paris by dismemberment, following which his body was burned on a bonfire. The house where he was born was burned down, his father, wife and daughter were banished from France, and his brothers and sisters were required to change their name. The King recovered physically very quickly, but the attack had a depressive effect on his spirits. One of his chief courtiers, Duford de Cheverny, wrote afterwards: "it was easy to see that when members of the court congratulated him on his recovery, he replied, 'yes, the body is going well', but touched his head and said, 'but this goes badly, and this is impossible to heal.'" After the assassination attempt, the King invited his heir, the Dauphin, to attend all of the Royal Council meetings, and quietly closed down the château at Versailles where he had met with his short-term mistresses."

=== Rebellion of the Parlements ===
The Parlements were assemblies of nobles in Paris and older regions of France, whose members served as magistrates and judged civil cases. Their members included both hereditary nobles and wealthy citizens who had purchased their seats. Several of the Parlements, such as those of Rouen and Provence, had been in existence for centuries, and saw themselves as the legitimate governments in their provinces. As Louis reorganized the government and appointed his own intendants in the provinces, the authority and prestige of the Parlements decreased, and the price of the seats dropped. In Franche-Comté, Bordelaise and Rouen, the Parlements refused to follow the decrees of the royal intendants. When the intendants attempted to assert their authority and collect taxes from all classes, the Parlements went on strike, refusing to proceed with the judgment of civil cases. The civil justice system came to a halt. In 1761, the provincial Parlement of Normandy in Rouen wrote a protest to the King, explaining that the King had the exclusive power to tax, but the Parlement had the exclusive right to collect the money. The King rejected the explanation and overruled the Parlement, banished some of his most provocative Parlement members to their estates. For the rest of his reign, the Parlements swore allegiance to the King, but took every opportunity to resist his new taxes and the King's authority. This was one of the seeds of resistance to the King's authority that was to turn into a Revolution less than thirty years later.

=== Achievements and dismissal of the government ===
The Comte d'Argenson served as the Minister of War from 1743 until 1747. He was an advocate of the continuation of the absolute monarchy in the style of Louis XIV. He was responsible for creating the first school for engineers in France at Mézières (1749–50); thanks to the trained engineers, France had the finest system of roads and bridges in Europe. He also established the military academy, the École Militaire, and, following the model of the Prussians, established military training camps and exercises, and helped rebuild French military power.

Machaud D'Arnouville was brought into the government with the sponsorship of d'Argenson, but the two men gradually became rivals and enemies. D'Arnouville was the Controller of Finances from 1745 to 1754, then Minister of Navy from 1754 to 1757. He was the creator of the unpopular "Vingtieme" tax (1749), which taxed all citizens, including the nobility, at the same rate, and also freed the prices of grain (1754), which initially greatly increased agricultural production. The fluctuation of grain prices would eventually become a factor in the French Revolution.

On 1 February 1757, the King abruptly dismissed both d'Arnouville and d'Argenson, and exiled them to their estates. The King held them responsible for not preventing the assassination attempt, and their government displeased Madame de Pompadour.

== Government of the Duke de Choiseul (1758–1770) ==
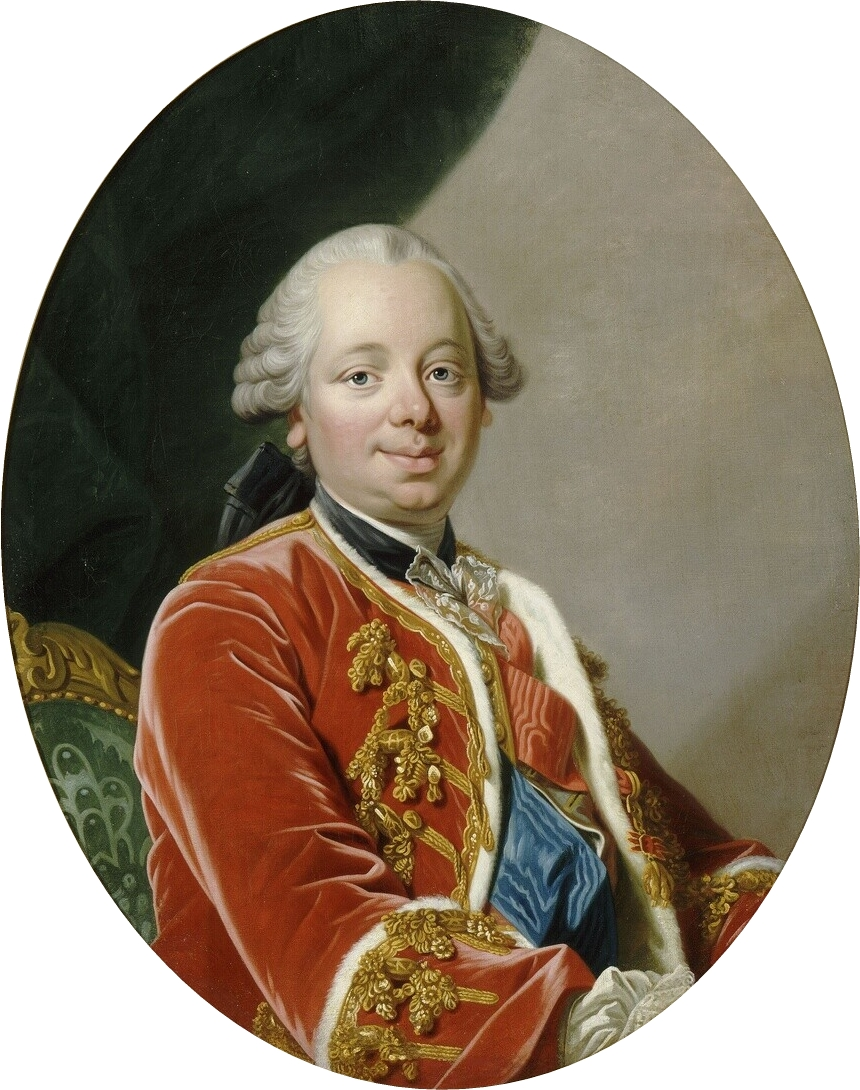
Étienne François de Choiseul, Duke of Choiseul

Louis named the Duke de Choiseul as his minister of foreign affairs on 3 December 1758, following the recommendation of Madame de Pompadour. In 1763, he became Minister of War, giving the role of minister of foreign affairs to his cousin, the Duc de Praslin. A few months later, he also became the Minister of the Navy, and became the most influential and powerful member of the government. In the council and circles of government, he was the leader of the philosophe faction, which included Madame de Pompadour, which sought to appease the Parlements and the Jansenists. On the diplomatic front, he negotiated a "Family Pact" with the Bourbon monarch of Spain (1761); negotiated the Treaty of Paris in 1761, and completed the integration of Lorraine into France (1766) upon the death of the King's father-in-law Stanisław Leszczyński, Duke of Lorraine. He incorporated Corsica into France (1768), and negotiated the marriage of his grandson, the future Louis XVI, with Marie Antoinette (1770).

His most notable accomplishment was the modernization of the French military, based on the lessons learned during the Seven Years' War. Under Choiseul, the government, rather than the officers, took the responsibility of training, giving uniforms, and training soldiers. The artillery was standardized, and new tactics, based on the Prussian model, were adopted and taught. The Navy in 1763 had been reduced to just 47 vessels and twenty frigates, three times smaller than the British Royal Navy fleet. He launched a major shipbuilding program to construct eighty vessels and forty-five new frigates, which would allow the French fleet, combined with the allied Spanish fleet, to outnumber the Royal Navy.

=== Suppression of the Jesuits (1764) ===
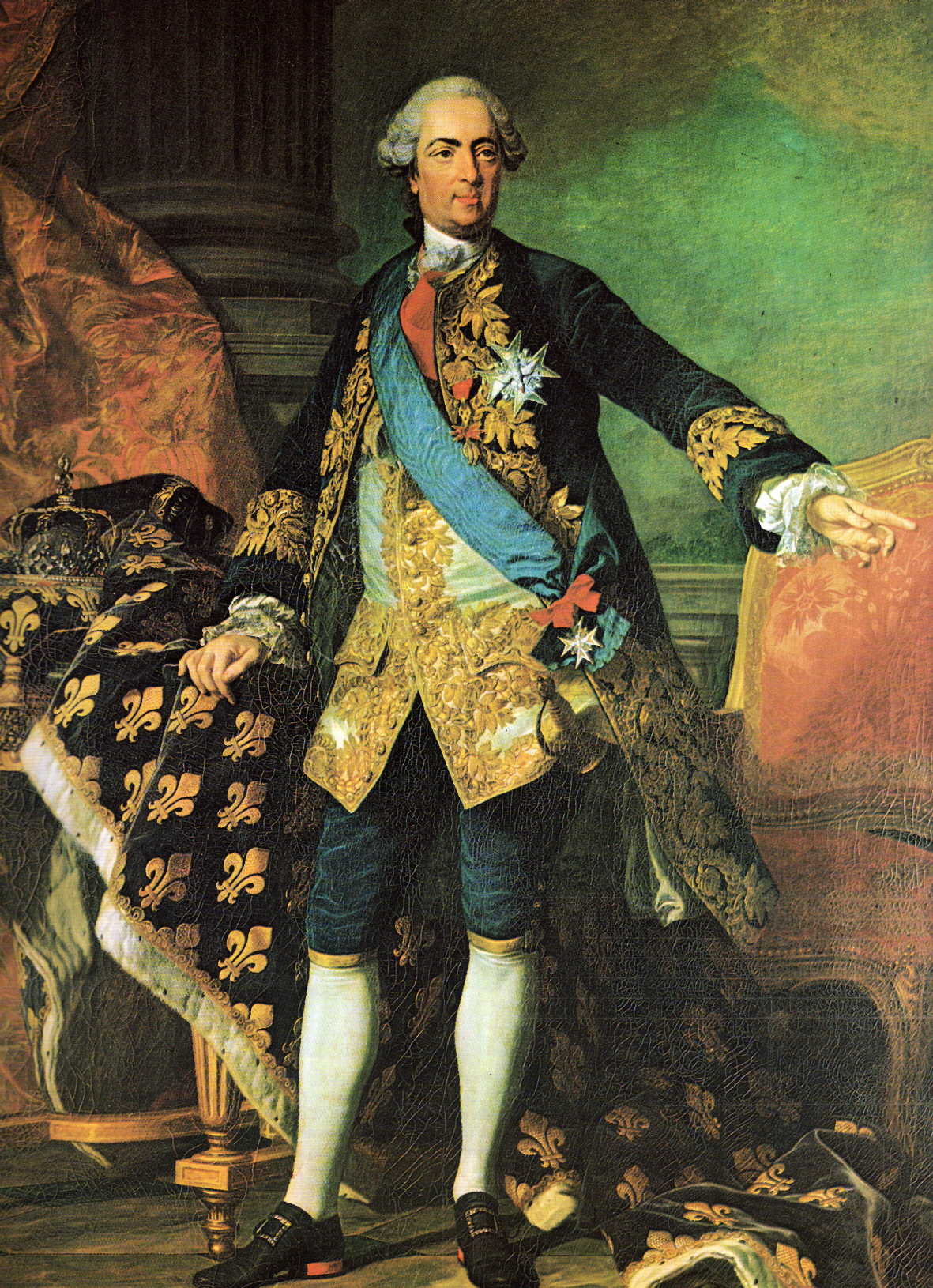
Louis XV in 1763

In 1764, at the urging of the Parlement, Madame de Pompadour and his foreign minister, the Duc de Chosieul, Louis decided upon the Suppression of Jesuit Order in France. The Jesuits in France numbered 3,500; they had 150 establishments in France, including 85 colleges, which were considered the best in France; their graduates included Voltaire and Diderot. The Confessor of the King, by a tradition dating back to Henry IV, was a Jesuit. Agitation against the Jesuits began in 1760 in the provincial Parlements, where the Gallicans, supporters of a specifically French version of Catholicism, were strong. The complaint against the Jesuits was that they were independent of the authority of the King and the hierarchy of the church in France. The Jesuits had already been expelled from Portugal and its colony of Brazil in 1759, because of conflicts with the government and church hierarchy there.

In France, the Parlements had taken the lead in attacking the Jesuits. On 12 February 1762, the Parlement of Rouen declared the Jesuits outside the law, forbid them to hold public positions or to teach, and demanded that they take an oath repudiating their beliefs. Between April and September 1762, the Parlements of Rennes, Bordeaux, Paris and Metz joined in the condemnation, followed in 1763 by Aix, Toulouse, Pau, Dijon and Grenoble. By the end of the year only the Parlements of Besançon, Douai, and the governments of Colmar, Flanders, Alsace and Franche-Comté, plus the Duchy of Lorraine, run by the Queen's father, the former King Stanislaus, permitted the Jesuits to function.

The campaign against the Jesuits divided the royal household; his son the Dauphin, his daughters and the Queen supported the Jesuits, while Madame de Pompadour, whose influence in the court was criticized by the Jesuits, wanted them gone. The indecisive King declared two years later that he had made the decision against his own feelings. The Jesuits departed, and were welcomed in Prussia and in Russia. The departure of the Jesuits weakened the church in France, and especially weakened the authority of the King, who, like a constitutional monarch, acted on behalf of the Parlements against his own beliefs.

=== Resistance from Parlements ===
Under the government of Choiseul, the Parlements of several French provinces continued to swear obedience to the King, while refusing to obey his intendents or to accept his new taxes. The Parlement of Franche-Comté in Besançon refused to collect the vingtieme tax imposed by the King to finance the war, claiming that only the Parlement could impose taxes. The King's government immediately dismissed the leaders of the Parlement and confined them to their residences. The Parlement of Normandy immediately supported that of Besançon; it wrote a remonstrance to the King on 5 July 1760, declaring that the Parlements represented all classes: "One King, one law, one Parlement; the law of the kingdom is a sacred pact of your alliance with the French nation; it is a kind of contract which destines the King to reign and the people to obey. In truth, no one except God can compel you to obey this sacred pact… but we can ask you, with respect, with submission… to keep your promises." This was too much for the King. He responded on 31 January 1761 that the Parlement's complaint "contained principles so false and so contrary to my authority and with expressions so indecent, particularly in connection with my Chancellor who only explained to you my wishes… that I send your letter back to you." The Parlement members of Besançon remained in exile.

The Parlement of Bordeaux went even further in its resistance to the royal government; in 1757 it brought accusations of corruption against the members of the government of the city of Bergerac, named by the Royal Council of the King. When the Royal Council blocked the pursuits of the Parlement, the Parlement wrote a protest to the King, declaring, "Sire, your Parlement cannot recognize any intermediate power between it and your person; no, your Council has over the Parlement no authority, superiority, or jurisdiction."

=== Finances and the brief ministry of Silhouette ===
The prolonged war drained the treasury of the Kingdom; France paid not only for its own army, but subsidized the armies of its allies; in 1759, France paid 19 million livres to its allies, an amount which Choiseul reduced by one-third in 1761. His new finance minister, Étienne de Silhouette imposed new taxes aimed at the wealthy; taxes on horses, carriages, silk, paintings, coffee and furs, and other luxury goods. The new taxes were extremely unpopular with the aristocracy and wealthy; Silhouette was dismissed after eight months, and his name became the common expression for paper cutouts made from a shadow, which, like his ministry, lasted only a moment. The King announced that he was giving his silver service to the mint, to be melted down and made into money.

The new Controller of Finances, Henri Bertin, a protégé of Madame de Pompadour named on 23 November 1759, reduced the luxury taxes of his predecessor, and instead proposed a broadening of the tax base to include those classes which had long been excluded, and a new survey of the wealth of the nobility. Once again the Parliaments rebelled. When the Lieutenant General of Normandy appeared before the Parliament to register the decree, it refused to register or collect the new taxes. The same scene was reproduced in the other Parlements. Once again the King yielded to Madame de Pompadour and her allies; the new decrees were withdrawn, Bertin was moved to a different position, the tax rolls were not enlarged, and no new taxes were collected; the debt remained.

=== Diplomacy – end of the Seven Years' War ===
The war with Great Britain continued, despite the death of King George II on 25 October 1760; the British Prime Minister William Pitt rejected French proposals for suggestions for negotiations. On 15 August 1761, France, Spain, Naples and Parma, all ruled by monarchs of the Bourbon family, signed the first "Family Compact", with a system of reciprocal guarantees of support if one or the other were attacked. At the same time, they signed a secret treaty with Charles III of Spain engaging Spain to declare war on Great Britain if the war was not over by May 1762. Learning of this pact, William Pitt wanted to declare an immediate war on Spain, but the new British King, George III, rejected the idea. The military forces of Frederick the Great in Prussia had been nearly exhausted in the long war against the combined forces of Austria and Russia; but Frederick was saved by the sudden death of the Tsarina Elizabeth in 1762, and her replacement by Peter III of Russia, a fervent admirer of the Prussian King.

Choiseul had taken over direction of the French navy as well as the army in October 1761, and he pressed for an offensive to bring the war to a successful end. He persuaded the Parlements and the chambers of commerce of the major French cities to sponsor the construction of warships, and rebuilt the French Navy. The French army launched a new offensive against the Prussians and Spain, and as promised by the Family Compact, launched an invasion in Portugal, an ally of Britain. However, once again the French initiatives were not enough. The French offensive in Hesse-Kassel was defeated by the Prussians, the Spanish army in Portugal made little progress, and the British took the opportunity to land on Martinique and to invade Spain's colony Cuba. Choiseul decided it was time to end the war. The preliminary negotiations opened at the Palace of Fontainebleau on 3 November 1762, and ended hostilities between Great Britain, France and Spain. The final treaty was signed in Paris on 10 February 1763. As a result of the War, France gave up its minor possessions in the West Indies; Marie Galante, Tobago and La Desiderade, but received back Guadeloupe, Martinique, and Santa Lucia, which, because of their sugar plantations, were considered of more value than all of its territories in Canada; France kept only the Iles of Saint Pierre and Miquelon. The valley of the Ohio, and the territories along the west bank of the Mississippi River were ceded to Spain. Louis formally ratified the treaty on 23 February, on the same day that his statue was unveiled on the Place Louis XV (today the Place de la Concorde)

=== Deaths of mistress, son and wife ===
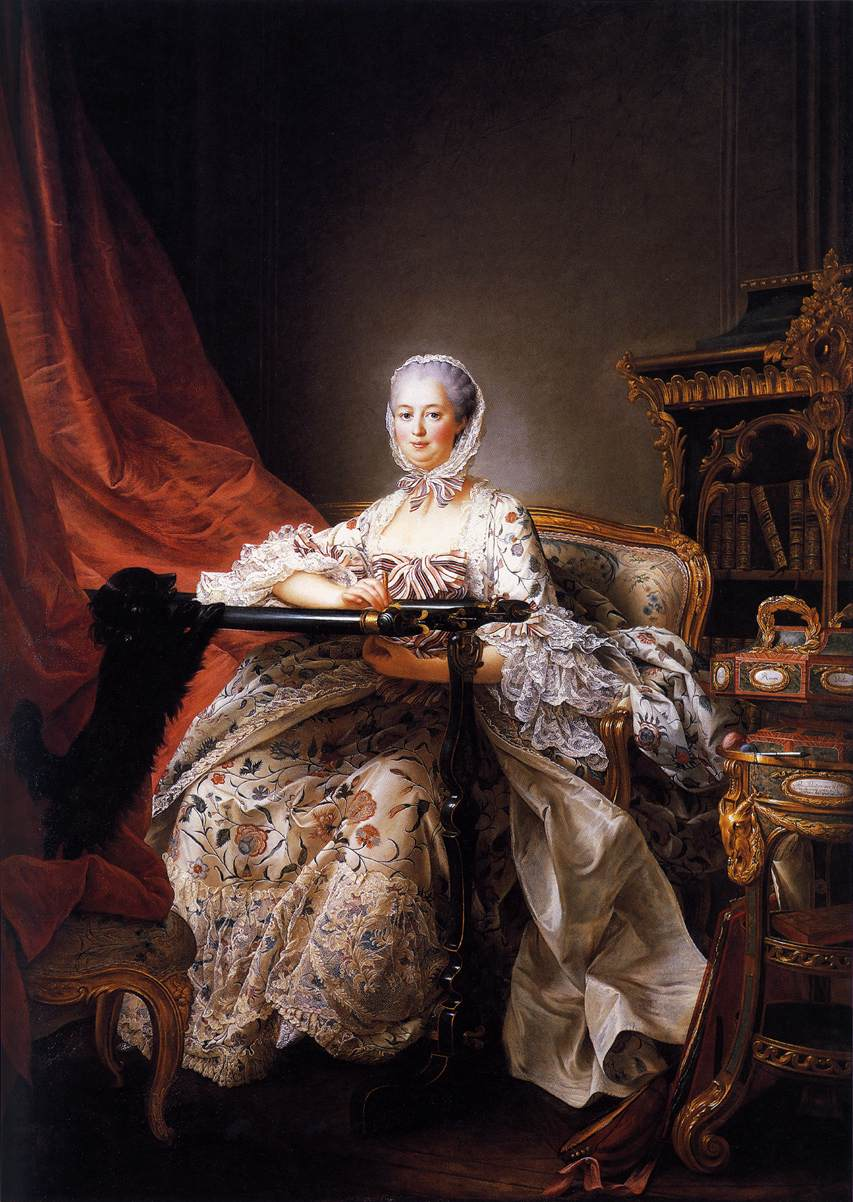
Madame de Pompadour by François-Hubert Drouais (1763–64)

The winter of 1763–64 was particularly harsh; Madame de Pompadour contracted pneumonia, and died on 15 April. The King was deeply affected, but, strictly observing court protocol, he did not attend her funeral, because she was too far below his rank, and, though mourning, carried on court business as usual. Maneuvering immediately began within the court to replace Madame de Pompadour; a leading candidate was the Duchess of Gramont, the sister of Choiseul, but the King showed no interest in a new mistress, and in February 1765 he closed down the Parc-aux-Cerfs, where he had previously met his petites maitresses.

The resistance of the Parlements to the King's authority continued. The Parlements of the provinces began to quarrel with the Parlement of Paris over which more truly represented the nation. In March 1764, the Parlement of Navarre in Pau, the smallest province, refused to accept the taxation authority of the Grand Council of the King. This time the King took action, arresting and replacing the President and leading officers of the Parlement, and replacing them with officers loyal to the King. The Parlements of Toulouse, Besançon and Rouen protested, but the King persisted. In 1765 the Parlement of Rennes in Rennes denied the authority of the King's officers to impose taxes without its permission, and went on strike. The King summoned the Parlement to Versailles, where he had his lecture read to them. This had little effect; when the King had his decree to the Parlement posted on the walls of Rennes, the Parlement ordered that the posters with the King's proclamation be taken down. The King issued letters of cachet that forbade the Parlement members to leave Rennes, but the judicial system remained on strike.

The end of 1765 brought another personal tragedy; his son and heir Louis contracted tuberculosis. He travelled with the King to the Palace of Fontainebleau. The King distracted himself by secluding himself with the astronomer César-François Cassini de Thury and making astronomic calculations, while the doctors tried, without success, to treat his son. The Dauphin died on 20 December 1765. The succession was assured, since the Dauphin had a son, the future Louis XVI, who was of age to rule, but the death put him into a deep depression. He drafted his own will, writing: "If I made errors, it was not from a lack of will, but from a lack of talents, and for not having been supported as I wished to have been, particularly in matters of religion."

The Queen, who was deeply affected by the death of the Dauphin in 1765, followed by the death of her father in 1766 and, finally, that of her daughter-in-law, died on 24 June 1768.

=== "Flagellation" of the Parlement ===
In January 1766, while the King was still mourning the death of the Dauphin, the Parlement of Rennes issued another rejection of the King's authority to collect taxes. When he ignored it, both the Parlement of Rennes and the Parlement of Rouen wrote him again, complaining that he was ignoring "the oath that you took to the nation when accepting the crown." When this part of the letter was read to the King, he interrupted the reading and declared that this accusation was false; he had taken an oath to God alone, not to the nation. On 3 March 1766, with only a few hours notice, he traveled in person from Versailles to the meeting of the Parlement of Paris at the Palais de la Cité and appeared before the members. In his message, read to them by one of his ministers, he declared, "It is in my person alone that sovereign power resides...To me alone belongs the legislative power, without dependence and without sharing...The public order emanates entirely from me...Confusion and anarchy are taking the place of legitimate order, and the scandalous spectacle of a contradictory rivaling my sovereign power reduces me to the sad necessity to use all the power that I received from God to preserve my peoples from the sad consequences of these enterprises." The speech, immediately termed "the flagellation", was published in official press, and circulated to all levels of government. It became his political testament. The conflict between the Parlements and King was muted for a time, but not resolved.

=== Third mistress ===
==== Madame du Barry ====
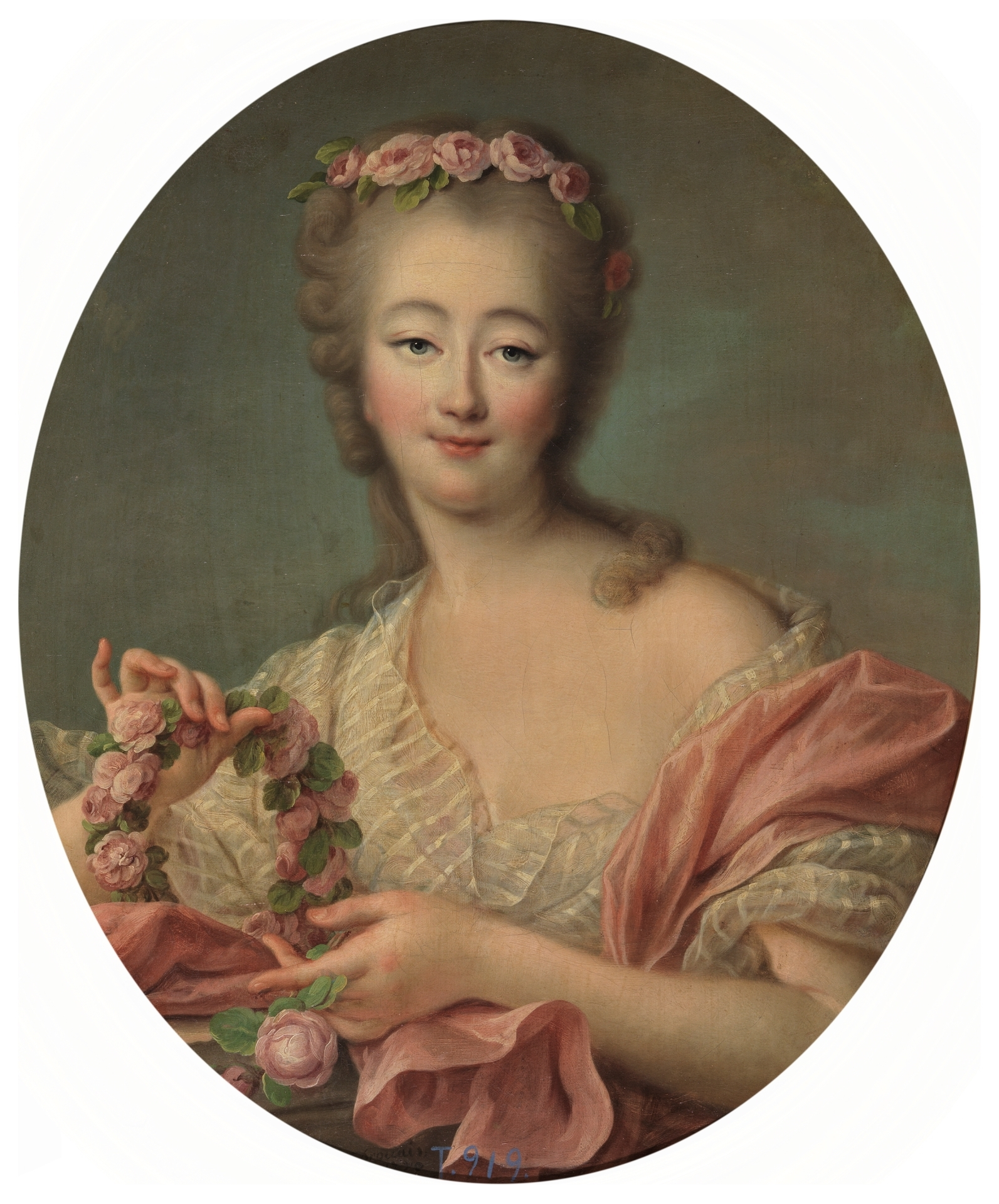
Madame du Barry, by François-Hubert Drouais (c. 1770)

After the death of the Madame de Pompadour, several women in the court sought to replace her, including the Duchess of Gramont, the sister of the Duke of Choiseul, the King's chief minister. However, the King's favor turned to Jeanne Bécu, the comtesse du Barry. She was thirty-three years younger than the King. She was the illegitimate daughter of Anne Bécu, a seamstress. She was raised by the Dames de Sacre-Coeur, and had various jobs as a shop assistant and designer of dresses before she became the mistress of Jean du Barry, the brother of a count. She began to hold a salon, which attracted writers and aristocrats. Since Jean du Barry was already married, to give her legitimacy he arranged for her to become engaged to his brother, Comte Guillaume du Barry, a retired soldier. They were married on 1 September 1768, and then, without consummating the marriage, Guillaume retired to his home in Languedoc. Through her acquaintances with the nobility, she was invited to Versailles, where the King saw her and was immediately attracted to her. He invited her to Fontainebleau, and then asked her to live in the Palace of Versailles. Her appearance at the Court scandalized the Duke de Choiseul, but pleased the enemies of the Duke within the Court.

For du Barry to be presented at Court, she had to be formally presented by a member of the nobility. The elderly Contesse de Béarn was persuaded to make the presentation for a large fee, and she was presented on 22 April 1769. None of the ladies of the Court attended, and Choiseul himself, to show his displeasure, hosted a large reception the following day, which all the Court, except du Barry, attended.

The King soon installed her in the Palace of Versailles, and in 1771 gave her the new Pavillon de Louveciennes. Choiseul sowed a strong dislike for du Barry, as did Marie Antoinette, who arrived in Versailles and married the Dauphin on 16 May 1770. She described the Comtesse as "the most stupid and impertinent creature imaginable". However, the King kept du Barry close to him until the final days before his death, when he sent her away before he made confession. The presence of du Barry at the court scandalized the high members of the aristocracy. Outside the Court, the opponents of the King in the Parlements used her presence to ridicule and attack the King. She was the target of dozens of scandalous pamphlets accusing her of every possible immoral act. Decades later, during the Reign of Terror of the French Revolution, the Comtesse was targeted by the Jacobins as a symbol of the hated old regime; she was guillotined on 8 December 1793.

=== France enlarged: Lorraine and Corsica ===
The borders of France were enlarged for the last time before the Revolution by two additions; the Duchy of Lorraine, ruled by the King's father-in-law, Stanislaus, reverted to France after his death, and was officially joined to the kingdom 27–28 March 1766. The acquisition of Corsica was more complicated. The island formally belonged to the Republic of Genoa, but an independent Republic of Corsica had been proclaimed in 1755 by Pasquale Paoli, and the rebels controlled most of the island. The Republic of Genoa did not have the military forces to conquer the island, and permitted Louis to send French troops to occupy the ports and major cities, to keep the island from falling into British hands. When the war ended, the island was formally granted to France by Treaty of Versailles on 19 May 1768. Louis sent the army to subdue the Corsican rebels; the army on the island eventually numbered twenty-seven thousand soldiers. In May 1769 the Corsican rebels were defeated at the Battle of Ponte Novu, and Paoli took refuge in England. In 1770 the island formally became a Province of France.

=== Commerce, agriculture and the "Starvation Pact" rumor ===
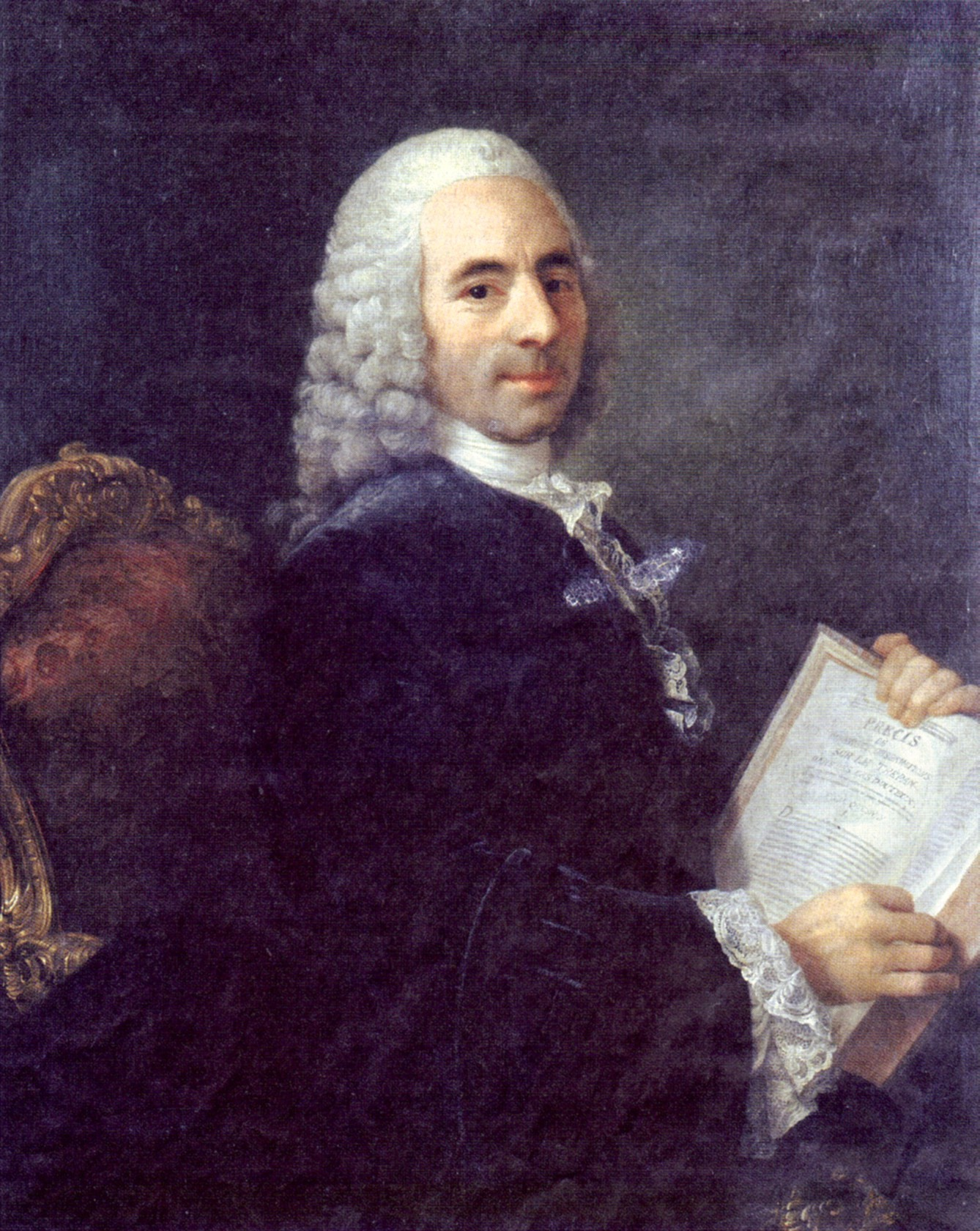
François Quesnay, physician and free-market economist

Two men had an enormous influence on the economic policies of the King. François Quesnay was the best-known economist in France. He was the King's doctor, and treated Madame de Pompadour, but was also a celebrated economic theorist, whose collected writings, "Tableau Économique" (1758), were avidly read by the King and his Court: Louis referred to him as "my thinker." His students included the Marquis de Mirabeau and Adam Smith. He was a critic of government regulation, and coined the term "bureaucracy" (literally, "A government of desks"). The other was his disciple, the Minister of the Commerce of the King, Jacques Claude Marie Vincent de Gournay. The two men advocated removing as many restrictions as possible from the economy, to encourage greater production and trade. De Gournay's famous expression, laissez faire, laissez passer ("let it be done, let it pass") was later adopted as the slogan of a whole school of free market economics.

De Gournay and Quesnay proposed in particular the liberalization of agricultural markets, which were strictly controlled, to encourage greater production, competition and lower prices. Following the doctrines of Quesnay and de Gournay, Louis's controller of finances, Henri Bertin, created a new Society of Agriculture and an Agricultural Committee within the government, comparable to those existing to support commerce. In May 1763, Bertin issued a decree permitting the tax-free circulation of grain. In August 1764, Bertin permitted the export of grain from twenty-seven French ports, later expanded to thirty-six. At the same time he established a large zone around Paris, where grain was reserved exclusively for feeding the Parisians, and established a cap on the grain price, which, if it was passed, would cause the exports to cease.

The policy of freeing grain prices was effective in good years, and resulted in increased trade and lower prices, but during years with poor harvests, 1766, 1767 and 1768, prices went up. Most of the Parlements, in regions which produced grain, supported the policy, but others, including Paris and Rouen, were highly critical. In those cities, rumors began to circulate of a mythical "Starvation Pact", a supposed plot by the government to deliberately starve and eliminate the poor. These rumors eventually became one of the factors that provoked the French Revolution.

=== Preparations for a new war with Great Britain ===
The Duc de Choiseul devoted all of his considerable energy and talents to preparing a new war against Britain. In 1764, in a former Jesuit school he had closed, he created a new military preparatory school, to prepare students for the recently founded Military Academy. In 1769 he raised the Naval school to the level of a royal academy, to train officers for his new fleet. In the same year he established a military engineering school. He provided the army with hundreds of new cannon, which would be used with great success decades later during the French Revolution and by Napoleon. Using the Prussian army as a model, he reformed French military doctrine, making the state and not the officers responsible for training and equipping soldiers. A large part of the French Navy had been sunk or captured by the British in the Seven Years' War. In addition to the existing naval arsenals in Toulon, Brest and Rochefort, he opened two more in Marseille (1762) and Lorient (1764). The arsenals began building new ships; by 1772 the Navy had sixty-six ships of the line, thirty-five frigates, and twenty-one new corvettes. He and his allies in the government began planning for an invasion of England, and his government looked for new ways to challenge Great Britain. When the Duc de Broglie learned that the British were planning to tax the citizens of the British colonies in America, he wrote to the King: "It will be very curious to know what the result will be, and if their execution doesn't result in a Revolution in those states."

Choiseul combined his military preparations for war with a diplomatic alliance, the Pacte de Famille or Pact of the Family, which united with other countries ruled by Kings of the Bourbon dynasty: Spain, ruled by Louis's cousin Charles III of Spain, the Naples and Tuscany. Choiseul was so entirely focused on Great Britain as his future enemy that he almost entirely neglected the rest of Europe. He had no accredited Ambassadors in Poland, Prussia or Russia during most of the period, and stood by while Russia imposed its own candidate for King of Poland, and when Turkey and Russia went to war in 1768–70.

=== Dismissal of Choiseul ===
A new conflict between Great Britain and Spain over the remote Falkland Islands in 1770 brought about Choiseul's downfall. The British had established a settlement in the islands, which were also claimed by Spain. In early 1770 the Spanish governor of Buenos Aires sent five warships full of troops to the islands, ordering the British to leave. The British prepared to depart. When the news reached London, the British government demanded that the Spanish leave. Both sides began to prepare for war.

The possibility of a new war came just as France was undergoing a new confrontation between the King's government and the Parlement of Rennes, which once again refused to recognize the power of the King's government to impose taxes. The King wrote immediately to his cousin, the King of Spain, who wrote back that Spain did not want a war. Louis replied, "Gentleness and patience have guided me to the present, but my parlements, pushing to limit, have forgotten themselves to the point of disputing the sovereign authority that we possess only from the will of God. I am resolved to make myself obeyed by all available means..." On 24 December, the King sent a short note to Choiseul dismissing him from his post and ordering him to return to his home in Chanteloup and to remain there. A similar note went to his cousin. Choiseul asked for two days to manage his affairs, but the King refused. Explaining the decision later to the Duke de Broglie, the King wrote, "The principles of the Choiseuls are too contrary to religion, and therefore to royal authority."

== Government of Maupeou and the Triumvirate (1770–1774) ==
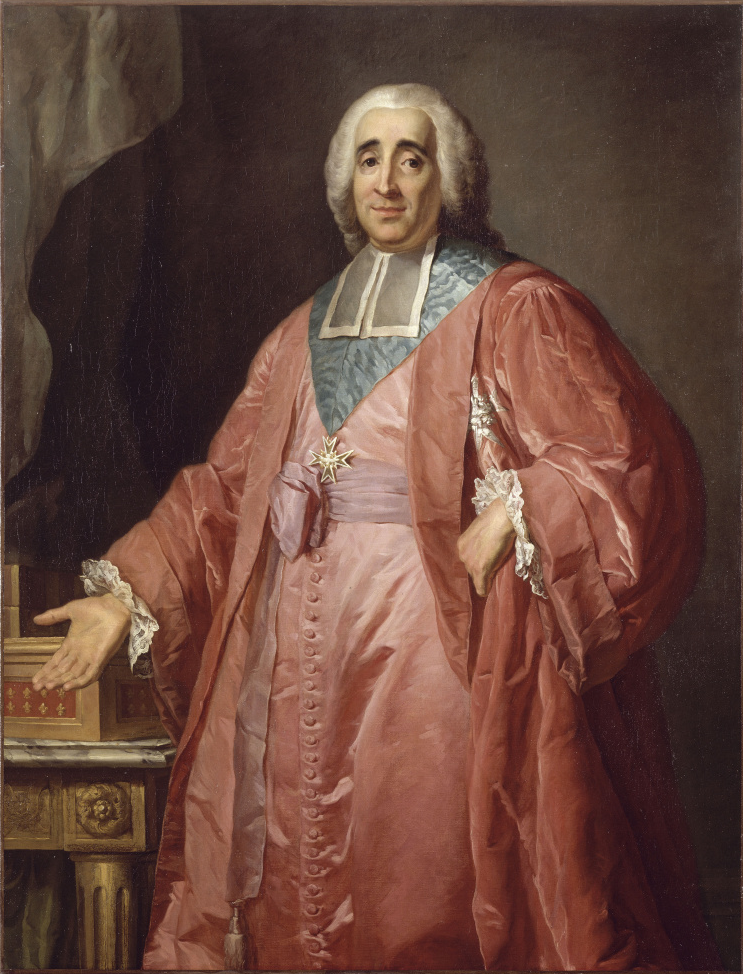
René de Maupeou, the Chancellor and last head of government under Louis XV

The King passed the leadership of the government to a triumvirate of three conservative ministers, led by his Chancellor, René de Maupeou, who had been President of the Parlement from 1763 to 1768. Maupeou and two other conservative ministers, Abbot Terray for finance and the Duc d'Aiguillon for foreign affairs and war, took charge of the government. They became known as "The Triumvirate".

=== Suppression of the Parlements ===
The first priority of Maupeou was to bring the unruly Parlements under control, and to continue with his program for the modernization of the state. Most of the members of the Parlement of Paris were on a virtual strike, refusing to render justice or approve the King's decrees. On 21 January 1771, royal agents and musketeers arrived at the homes of each of the Parlement members, informing them that their positions were confiscated and ordering them to leave Paris and return to their home provinces, and not to leave them. This was followed in February by an even more radical measure: the regional Parlements were replaced as the high courts of civil justice by six new regional high councils, to judge serious criminal and civil cases. Another decree announced the abolition of the high fees demanded by the Parlements for resolving civil cases, which were the source of their members' income; civil justice was to be rendered without charge. The powers of the Parlement of Paris alone were largely unchanged. Without the provincial parliaments, the government was able enact new laws and taxes without opposition. However, after the King's death, the nobility demanded and received the restoration of the regional parlements.

=== Finances ===
Abbot Terray was nominally a priest, though his government career was entirely secular, and his personal life was considered scandalous. He was an efficient and relentless tax collector; he opened a school to train tax inspectors, and worked to see that taxes were imposed and collected with the same precision and vigor in all regions, without interference from the local nobility. When he first took his position, the state had a budget deficit of 60 million livres, and a long-term debt of 100 million livres. By 1774, revenues had been increased by 60 million livres and the debt reduced to 20 million livres. He also reimposed the regulation of the price of grain, which had been freed in 1763 and 1764; these controls were an issue which would disturb the government and provoke agitation until the French Revolution.

=== Foreign affairs ===
The foreign affairs post had been left vacant by Choiseul, who acted as his own foreign minister. Following the dismissal of Choiseul, the King encouraged his cousin and ally Charles III of Spain to settle the crisis over the Falkland Islands with the aim of avoiding a war. Due to Choiseul's sole focus on a war with Britain, he had completely ignored the rest of Europe. France did not even have an ambassador in Vienna. In 1772 Austria, Russia and Prussia took territory from an old French ally, Poland, without protest from France. Another ally of France, Sweden, also risked being divided between Russia and Prussia upon the death of its King in 1771. The Prince Royal, Gustav III, was staying in Paris at the time. He had a long meeting with Louis XV, who promised to support him. With French funding, and assistance from Louis's personal secret intelligence service, the Secret du Roi, Gustave III returned to Stockholm. On 19 August 1772, at his command, the Swedish royal guard imprisoned the Swedish Senate, and two days later he was proclaimed King by the Diet. Russia and Prussia, occupied with the division of Poland, protested but did not intervene.

=== Last years in Versailles ===
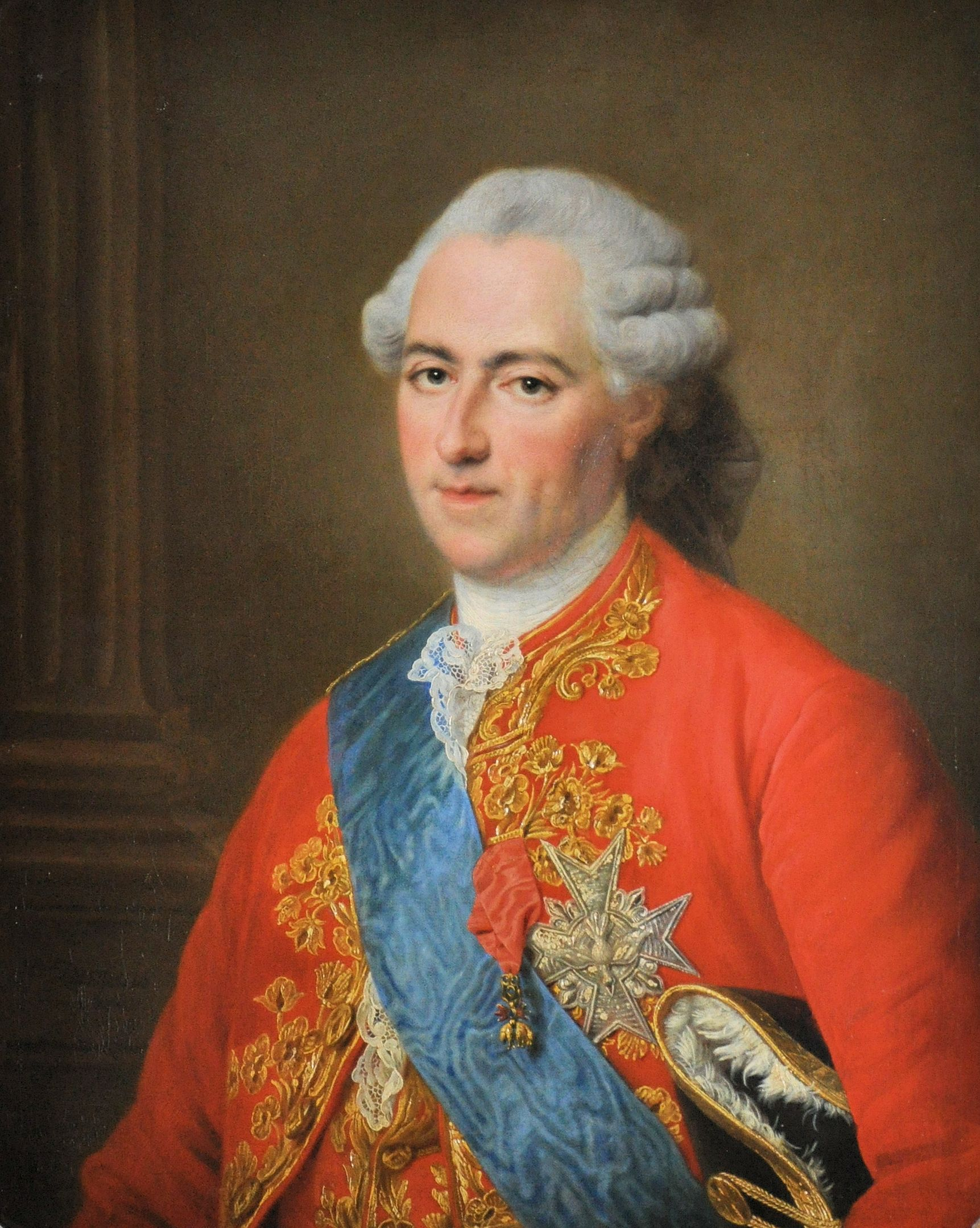
Louis XV a year before his death (1773) by François-Hubert Drouais

In the last years of his reign, the court of Versailles was a theater of manners. Marie Antoinette, a resident since her marriage, had difficulty disguising her dislike for the King's mistress, Madame du Barry. The King constructed a set of luxurious rooms for Madame du Barry on the floor above his offices; Madame du Barry also reigned in the Petit Trianon, which the King had built for Madame de Pompadour, and in the Pavillon de Louveciennes, also built for Madame de Pompadour. The Court was divided between those who welcomed Madame du Barry, and those of the older aristocracy, such as the Duc de Choiseul plus Marie Antoinette, who scorned her. The King continued his grand construction projects, including the opera theater of the Palace of Versailles, completed for the celebration of the wedding of the Dauphin and Marie Antoinette, and the new Place Louis XV (now Place de la Concorde) in Paris, whose centerpiece was an equestrian statue of the King, modeled after that of Louis XIV on the Place Vendôme.

=== Death ===
On 26 April 1774, the King left for the Petit Trianon with Madame du Barry and several nobles from his entourage, and reported that he felt ill. He participated in the hunt the next day, but rode in his carriage instead of on horseback. That evening he was still feeling ill, and sent for the Court physician, Le Mariniére. At the surgeon's insistence, the King was brought back to the Palace of Versailles for treatment, along with Madame du Barry and the others. The King was attended by six physicians, six surgeons, each of whom took his pulse and gave his diagnosis. He was bled three times by the surgeons, without effect. When some red eruptions appeared on his skin, the doctors first diagnosed petite variole, or smallpox, which caused optimism, since the patient and doctors both believed he had already had the illness. The members of the family, particularly the Dauphin and Marie Antoinette, were asked to leave, since they had not already had the illness, and had no immunity. Madame du Barry remained with him. As the hours passed, the red eruptions of the disease grew worse, and the doctors began to fear for his life. On the morning of 1 May, the Archbishop of Paris arrived, but was kept out of the King's room to avoid alarming him. The King remained conscious and cheerful. However, on 3 May, he studied the eruptions on his hands, summoned the Archbishop, and announced, "I have the petite variole." The Archbishop instructed him to prepare for the final rites. That night, the King summoned Madame du Barry, informed her of the diagnosis, and said, "We cannot recommence the scandal of Metz. If I had known what I know now, you would not have been admitted. I owe it to God and to my people. Therefore, you have to leave tomorrow." On 7 May, he summoned his confessor and was given the final rites. The illness continued its course; one visitor on 9 May, the Duc de Croy, said the King's face resembled, with the darkening of the eruptions of the smallpox, "a mask of bronze". Louis died at 3:15 in the morning on 10 May 1774, with his daughters Adélaïde, Victoire, Sophie, and Louise at his bedside.

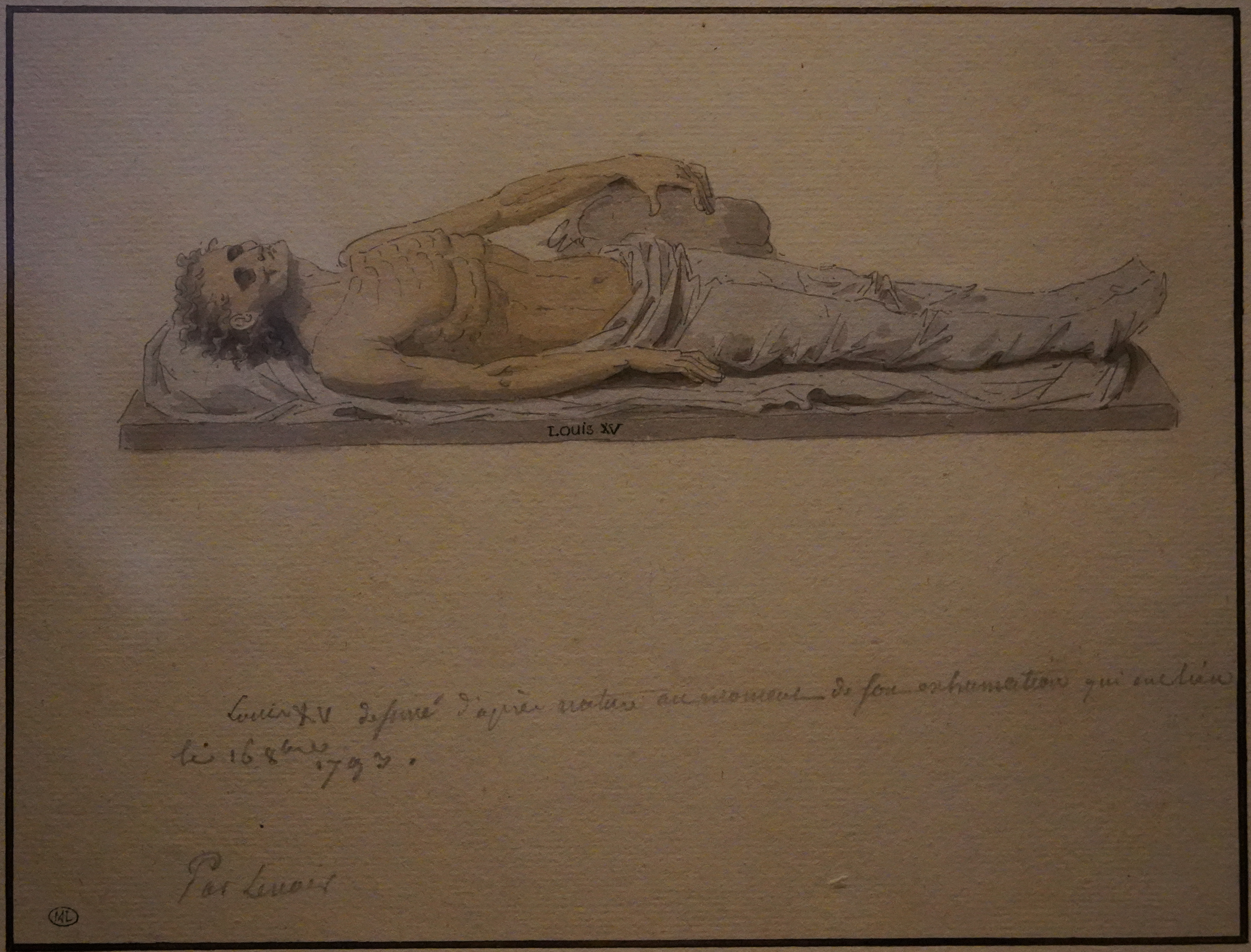
Drawing of the body of Louis XV as it appeared during the exhumation that took place amid the desecration of the royal tombs during the Revolution, 19 years after his death

During the French Revolution, the royal tombs were desecrated, partly to recover the lead from the coffins, and mostly to celebrate one year since the abolition of the monarchy. On October 16, 1793 (the same day as the execution of Marie Antoinette), the tomb and the king's coffin were destroyed and opened, and there were two reports on the event.

According to Dom Poirée, a Benedictine monk of the Abbey, the coffin was not opened inside the abbey, but rather at the edge of the burial pit. The body of the King, tightly wrapped in cloth and bandages, appeared to be intact and well-preserved. However, once the wrappings were removed, it "no longer resembled a human corpse". The entire body had decayed, and a stench so unbearable filled the air that it was impossible to stay nearby. To purify the air, the revolutionaries had to burn gunpowder and fire several shots. The body was found in an "advanced state of putrefaction and almost reduced to dust", to the point that the revolutionaries had to purify the air, even though a drawing of the exhumed body suggests otherwise.

Contrary to the previous accounts, Alexandre Lenoir, who witnessed the desecration of the royal tombs at Saint-Denis, described the exhumation of Louis XV as follows:

"Surprisingly, this corpse, said to have died in 1771 [sic], and exhumed before me on October 10, 1793 — after twenty years of burial — appeared remarkably well-preserved, with skin as fresh as if he had just been laid to rest. In fact, no odor at all emerged when the tomb was opened, whereas the tomb of Henri IV released a strong scent of aromatic substances."

The remains of the Monarch were then thrown into a mass grave along with those of the other monarchs. The bodies were only partially recovered by Louis XVIII during the Restoration (on January 21, 1816, those of the guillotined monarchs, exactly one year after the others), and were buried in the Ossuary near the Bourbon crypt, since individual identification was impossible—and there they remain to this day.

== Personality ==
Several of his contemporaries who worked closely with him tried to describe the personality of Louis XV. The Duke de Croy wrote: "He had a memory, presence, and justness of spirit that was unique. He was gentle, an excellent father, and the most honest individual in the world. He was well informed in the sciences...but with a modesty which, with him, was almost a vice. He always saw more correctly than others, but he always believed he was wrong.... He had the greatest bravery, but a bravery that was too modest. He never dared to decide for himself, but always, out of modesty, turned for advice to others, even when he saw more accurately than they did...Louis XIV had been too proud, but Louis XV was not proud enough. Other than his excessive modesty, his great and sole vice was women; He believed that only his mistresses loved him enough to tell him the truth. For that reason he allowed them to lead him, which contributed to his failure with finance, which was the worse aspect of his reign."

Others, like d'Argenson, his Minister of War commented on his extreme shyness and timidity; his inability to make conversation with others. The Duke of Luynes remarked that he often seemed to want to speak, but "his timidity stopped him and the expressions did not come; one felt that he wanted to say something obliging, but he often ended by simply asking a frivolous question."

Another characteristic remarked by contemporaries was his penchant for secrecy. "No one was a greater expert at dissimulation than the King", wrote d'Argenson. "He worked from morning to night to dissimulate; he did not say a word, make a gesture or demarche except to hide what he really wanted."

"He was the most excellent of men", wrote another contemporary, Duffort de Cheverny, "but, in defiance of himself, he spoke about the affairs of state as if someone else was governing."

== Legends: "After us, the flood" and the Parc-aux-Cerfs ==
The most famous remark attributed to Louis XV (or sometimes to Madame de Pompadour) is Après nous, le déluge ("After us, the flood"). It is commonly explained as his indifference to financial excesses, and a prediction of the French Revolution to come.

Another popular legend concerned the Maison-aux-Cerfs, the house at Versailles where, when the King was no longer having sexual relations with Madame de Pompadour, he sometimes slept with his petites maîtresses, young women recruited for that purpose. The conventional wisdom at the time was to view it as a kind of harem, organized by Madame de Pompadour, where a group of women were kidnapped and kept for the King's pleasure. The legend circulated widely in pamphlets with lurid illustrations, and made its way into some later biographies of the King. In reality the house had only one occupant at a time, and for brief periods. Madame de Pompadour herself accepted the Maison-aux-Cerfs as a preferable alternative to the risks of a rival at court, as she stated: "It is his heart I want! All these little girls with no education will not take it from me. I would not be so calm if I saw some pretty woman of the court or the capital trying to conquer it." In February 1765, after the death of Madame de Pompadour, the house was closed.

== Patron of architecture and arts ==
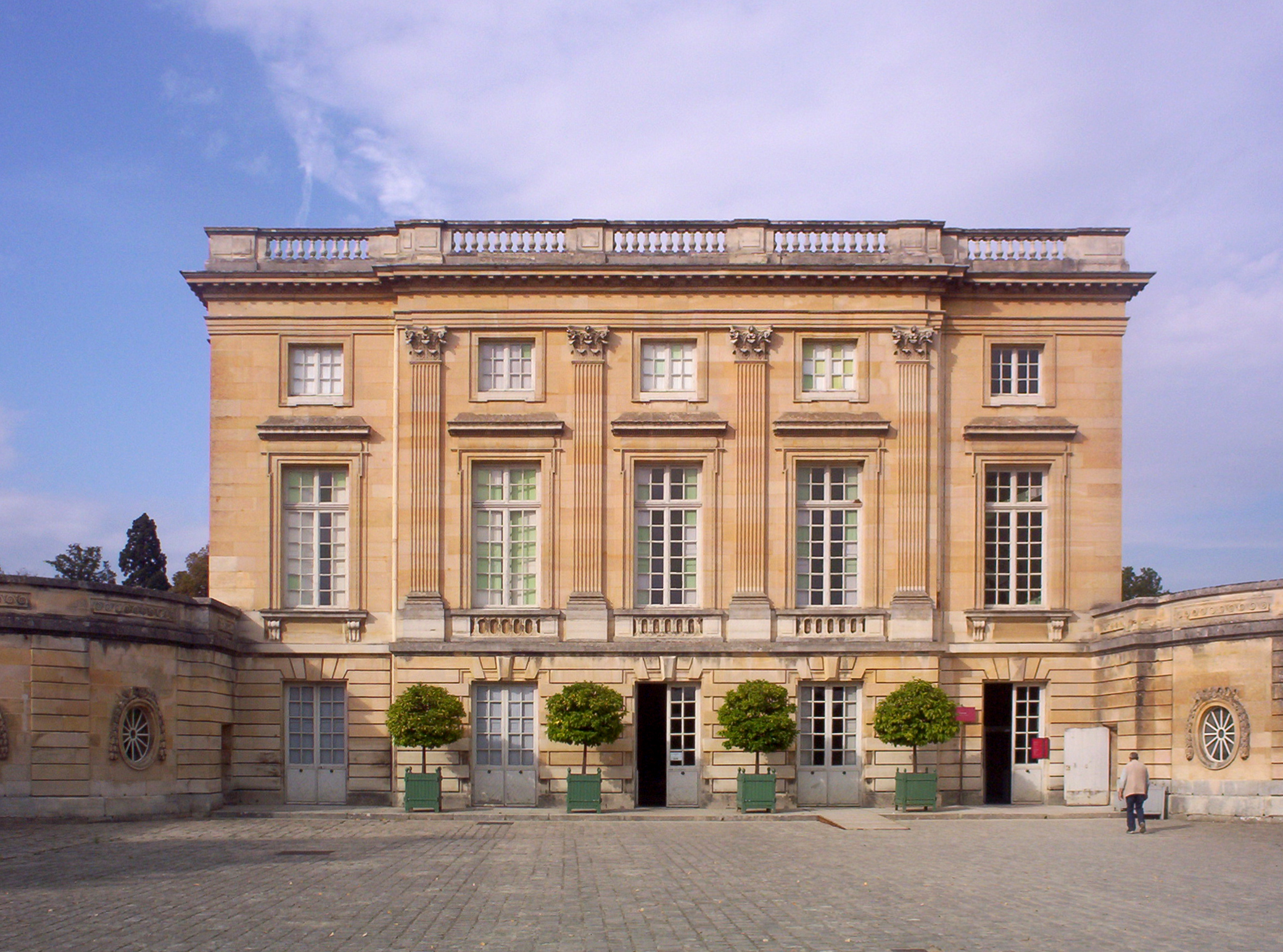
The Petit Trianon by Ange-Jacques Gabriel (1764)

Louis was a major patron of architecture; he spent more money on buildings over the course of his reign than Louis XIV. His major architectural projects were the work of his favorite court architect, Ange-Jacques Gabriel. They included the Ecole Militaire (1751–1770); the Place Louis XV, now Place de la Concorde (1763–83); the Petit Trianon at Versailles (1762–64), and the opera theater of the Palace of Versailles. Louis began construction of the Church of Saint-Geneviève, now the Pantheon (1758–90). He also constructed monumental squares and surrounding buildings in the centers of Nancy, Bordeaux, and Rennes. His workshops produced fine furniture, porcelain, tapestries and other goods in the Louis XV Style which were exported to all the capital cities of Europe.

The King, the Queen and her daughters were major patrons of music. The queen and her children played the clavecin, under the instruction of François Couperin. The young Mozart came to Paris and wrote two sonatas for clavecin and violin which he dedicated to Madame Victoire, the King's daughter. Jean-Marie Leclair was appointed Director of the Music of the Chapel and the Apartments in 1733, Leclair resigned in 1736 following a dispute with another royal appointee Jean-Pierre Guignon. The most important musical figure of the reign was Jean Philippe Rameau, who was the court composer through the 1740s and 1750s, and wrote more than thirty operas for Louis and his court. The King himself, like his grandfather Louis XIV, was taught to dance ballet but danced only once in public, in 1725.

Louis XV, guided largely by Madame de Pompadour, was the most important art patron of the period. He commissioned François Boucher to paint pastoral scenes for his apartments in Versailles, and gave him the title of First Painter of the King in 1765. Other artists patronized by the King included Jean-Baptiste Oudry, Maurice Quentin de la Tour, Jean Marc Nattier, and the sculptor Edme Bouchardon. Bouchardon created the monumental statue of Louis XV on horseback which was the centerpiece of Place Louis XV until it was pulled down during the Revolution.

== King and the Enlightenment ==
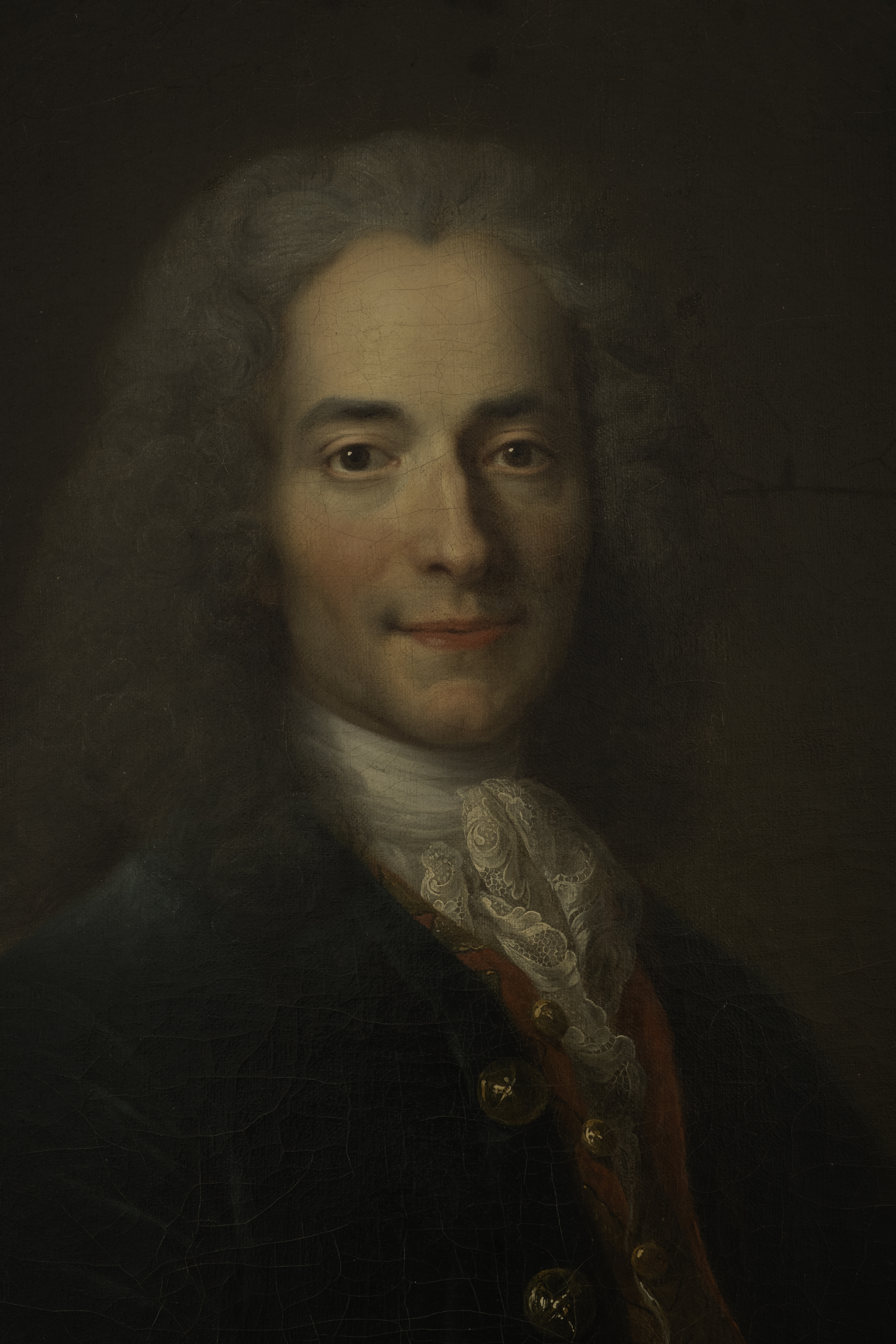
Voltaire (1724–25)

The French philosophical movement later called the Enlightenment began and gathered force during the reign of Louis XV; in 1746 Diderot published his Pensées philosophiques, followed in 1749 by his Lettres sur les Aveugles and the first volume of the Encyclopédie, in 1751. Montesquieu published De l'esprit des Lois, in 1748. Voltaire published le Siecle de Louis XIV and l'Essai sur les moeurs et l'esprit des nations, in 1756. Rousseau became known in 1750 by the publication of Discours sur les sciences et les arts, followed in 1755 by Discours sur l'origine et les fondements de l'inégalité parmi les hommes. These were accompanied by new works on economics, finance, and commerce by the elder Mirabeau, François Quesnay and other scientific thinkers which undermined all of the standard assumptions of royal government, economics and fiscal policy.

The censors of Louis XV at first permitted these publications; the first volume of the Encyclopédie received official permission because the government censors believed it was purely a collection of scientific articles. The project soon included a multitude of authors, including Rousseau, and had four thousand subscribers. Only later did the government and King himself take notice, after the church attacked the Encylopédie for questioning official church doctrines. The King personally removed Diderot from the list of those nominated for the Académie française, and in 1759 the Encyclopédie was formally banned.

Rousseau had a resounding success in 1756 with his opera Devin du Village, and was invited to Versailles to meet the King, but he refused. Instead, he wrote the Contrat Social calling for a new system based upon political and economic equality, published in 1762. Increasingly solitary and unstable, he wandered from province to province, before returning to Paris, where he died in solitude in 1778. His ideas, composed during the reign of Louis XV, were adopted by the revolutionaries who overthrew Louis XVI in 1789.

In the 1740s Voltaire was welcomed to the court as a playwright and poet, but his low rank as the son of a notary and the fact his father was also a Jansenist soon displeased the King and the Queen, and he was finally forced to depart Versailles. He went to Berlin, where he became a counselor to Frederick the Great, before living in Geneva and Savoy, far from Paris. On one issue in particular Voltaire took the side of Louis XV; when the King suppressed the parlements of nobles, demanded that all classes be taxed equally, and removed the charges which plaintiffs had to pay in order to have their cases heard. He wrote: "Parlements of the King! You are charged with rendering justice to the people! Render justice upon yourselves!... There is in the entire world no judicial court which has ever tried to share the power of the sovereign." However, the King's lack of further reforms in his last years disappointed Voltaire. When the King died, Voltaire wrote of his reign, "Fifty-six years, consumed with fatigues and wanderings."

== Legacy and historical judgments ==
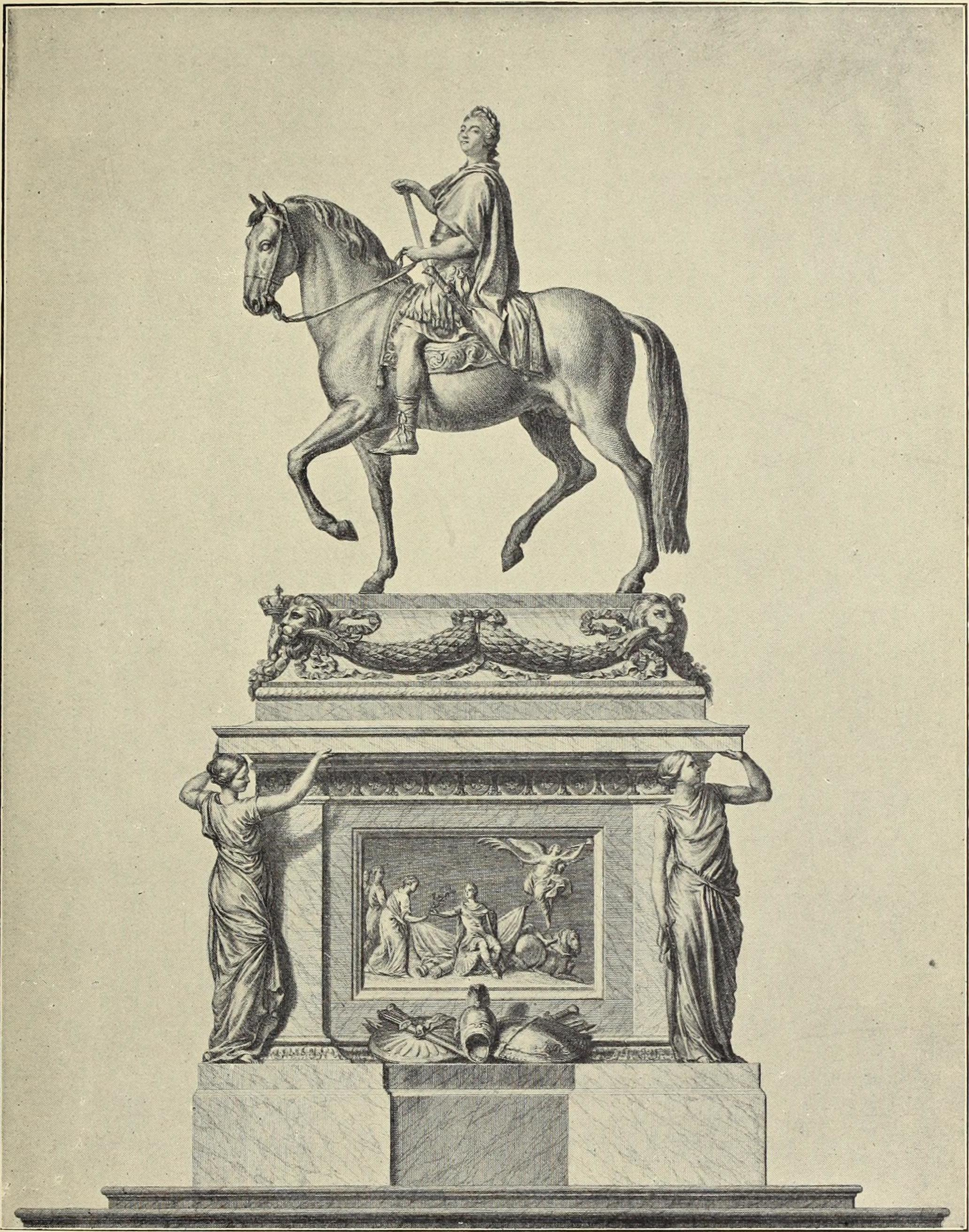
Design by Edmé Bouchardon for statue of the King on Place Louis XV

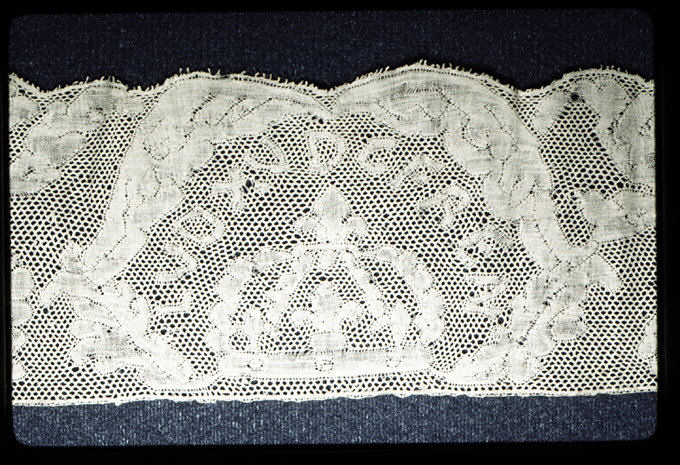
Sleeve ruffle (Engageante) MET GT14a

E. H. Gombrich writes, "Louis XV and Louis XVI, the Sun King's successors, were incompetent, and content merely to imitate their great predecessor's outward show of power. The pomp and magnificence remained.... Finance ministers soon became expert swindlers, cheating and extorting on a grand scale. The peasants worked until they dropped and citizens were forced to pay huge taxes." Louis was blamed for significant diplomatic, military and economic reverses. His reign was marked by ministerial instability, while his "prestige was ruined by military failure and colonial losses". Despite Louis' failings in administration and war, many historians agree that France reached a high point of culture and art under his reign.

Louis inherited a French monarchy at the zenith of its cultural influence and political power, a position it kept during the first half of the eighteenth century. However most scholars agree that Louis XV's decisions weakened France, depleted the treasury, discredited the absolute monarchy, and unsettled the trust and respect of the French and foreigners alike. Scholars point to the French Revolution, which broke out 15 years after his death. Norman Davies characterizes Louis XV's reign as "one of debilitating stagnation", characterized by a costly defeat in the Seven Years' War, endless clashes between the Court and the Parlements, and religious feuds. Jerome Blum described the king as "a perpetual adolescent called to do a man's job."

The view of many historians is that Louis was unequal to the high expectations of his subjects. Robert Harris writes that, "Historians have depicted this ruler as one of the weakest of the Bourbons, a do-nothing king who left affairs of state to ministers while indulging in his hobbies of hunting and womanizing." Ministers rose and fell according to his mistresses' opinions, seriously undermining the confidence in the monarchy.

For much of his lifetime Louis XV was celebrated as a national hero. Edmé Bouchardon's equestrian statue of Louis was originally conceived to commemorate the monarch's victorious role in the War of the Austrian Succession, portrayed the king as peacemaker. Fifteen years later in 1763, following France's defeat in the Seven Years' War, it was unveiled in a patriotic spectacle staged to restore public confidence in a monarchy in decline. Located on the Place Louis XV, the statue was torn down during the Revolution.

Some scholars have turned away from the king's own actions to his image in the mind of the public. Emmanuel Le Roy Ladurie, the leader of the Annales School, noted that the king was handsome, athletic, intelligent and an excellent hunter, but that he disappointed the people. However, he did not keep up the practice of attending Mass, and the people felt he had shirked his religious obligations and diminished the sacred nature of the monarchy.

According to Kenneth N. Jassie and Jeffrey Merrick, contemporary songs, poems, and public declarations typically portrayed a king as a "master", an unblemished "Christian", and a benevolent provider ("baker"). Young Louis' failings were attributed to inexperience and manipulation by his advisors. Jassie and Merrick argue that the king's troubles mounted steadily, and the people blamed and ridiculed his debauchery. The king was a notorious womaniser; the monarch's virility was supposed to reflect his power. Nevertheless, popular faith in the monarchy was shaken by the scandals of Louis' private life and by the end of his life he had become despised. The king ignored the famines and crises of the nation, until the people reviled him in protest, and finally celebrated his death. The monarchy survived—for a while—but Louis XV left his successor with a smoldering legacy of popular resentment.

Some sermons on his death in 1774 praised the monarch and went out of their way to excuse his faults. Jeffrey Merrick writes: "But those ecclesiastics who not only raised their eyebrows over the sins of the Beloved but also expressed doubts about his policies reflected the corporate attitude of the First Estate more accurately." They prayed the new king would restore morality at court and better serve the will of God.

The financial strain imposed by the wars and excesses of the royal court, and the consequent dissatisfaction with the monarchy, contributed to the national unrest that culminated in the French Revolution of 1789. The historian Colin Jones argues that Louis XV left France with serious financial difficulties: "The military disasters of the Seven Years' War led to acute state financial crisis.". Ultimately, Louis XV failed to overcome these fiscal problems, mainly because he was incapable of resolving conflicts among the parties and interests in his entourage. Although aware of the forces of anti-monarchism threatening his family's rule, he did not act effectively to stop them.

Trends in 20th-century French historiography, especially the Annales School, have deprecated biography and minimized the role of the King. English historian William Doyle wrote:

The political story....of the reigns of Louis XV and Louis XVI, by contrast, had too often been scorned, and therefore neglected, as a meaningless succession of petty intrigues in boudoirs and bedrooms, unworthy of serious attention when there were economic cycles, demographic fluctuations, rising and falling classes, and deep-seated shifts in cultural values to analyse.

A few scholars have defended Louis, arguing that his highly negative reputation was based on propaganda meant to justify the French Revolution. Olivier Bernier argued that Louis le Bien-aimé (the well-beloved) was a popular leader who reformed France. During his 59-year reign, France was never threatened by foreign conquest, though some of its overseas colonies were lost. Many of his subjects prayed for his recovery during his serious illness in Metz in 1744. His dismissal of the Parlement of Paris and his chief minister, Choiseul, in 1771, were attempts to wrest control of government from those Louis considered corrupt. He changed the tax code to try to balance the national budget. Bernier argued that these acts would have avoided the French Revolution if his successor Louis XVI had not reversed them. Guy Chaussinand-Nogaret claims that Louis XV's tarnished reputation was created fifteen years after his death, to justify the Revolution, and that the nobility during his reign were competent.

== Arms ==
Coat of arms of Louis XV
Notes Upon his accession to the throne Louis assumed the royal coat of arms of France & Navarre. Adopted 1715–1774 Crest The Royal crown of France Helm An opened gold helmet, with blue and gold mantling. Escutcheon Azure, three fleurs-de-lis Or (for France) impaling Gules on a chain in cross saltire and orle Or an emerald Proper (for Navarre). Supporters The two supporters are two angels, acting as heralds for the two realms. The dexter angel carries a standard with the arms of France, and wearing a tabard with the same arms. The sinister angel also carries a standard and wears a tabard, but that of Navarre. Both are standing on puffs of cloud. Motto The motto is written in gold on a blue ribbon: MONTJOIE SAINT DENIS the war cry of France, Saint Denis was also the abbey where the oriflamme was kept. Orders The escutcheons are surrounded first by the chain of the Order of Saint Michael and by the chain of the Order of the Holy Spirit, both were known as the ordres du roi. Other elements Above all is a pavilion armoyé with the Royal crown. From it, is a royal blue mantle with a semis of fleurs-de-lis Or, lined on the inside with ermine. Banner Royal standard of the king

== Issue ==
- Louise Élisabeth (14 August 1727 – 6 December 1759), Duchess of Parma, had issue
- Anne Henriette (14 August 1727 – 10 February 1752)
- Marie-Louise (28 July 1728 – 19 February 1733)
- Louis-Ferdinand, Dauphin of France (4 September 1729 – 20 December 1765), married to Marie Thérèse Raphaëlle and had issue, then married to Duchess Marie-Josèphe of Saxony and had issue including Louis XVI
- Philippe, Duke of Anjou (30 August 1730 – 17 April 1733)
- Marie Adélaïde (23 March 1732 – 27 February 1800)
- Victoire Louise Marie Thérèse (11 May 1733 – 7 June 1799)
- Sophie Philippine Élisabeth Justine (27 July 1734 – 3 March 1782)
- Marie Thérèse Félicité (16 May 1736 – 28 September 1744)
- Louise Marie (15 July 1737 – 23 December 1787)

=== Illegitimate issue ===
Louis XV had several illegitimate children, although the exact number is unknown. Historiography suggest the following as possible issue of the King:

- With Pauline Félicité de Mailly (1712 – 9 September 1741), by marriage marquise de Vintimille. She died after giving birth to a son:
  - Charles Emmanuel Marie Magdelon de Vintimille (Versailles, 2 September 1741 – Saint-Germain-en-Laye, 24 February 1814), marquis du Luc. Recognized by his mother's husband, although was highly probable that his biological father was Louis XV, especially in adulthood, when he was called Demi-Louis ("Small Louis") for his exceptional resemblance with the King. He was appointed Maréchal de camp and Governor of Porquerolles. Married to Adélaïde de Castellane on 26 November 1764, he fathered three children.
- With Jeanne Perray:
  - Amélie Florimond de Norville (Saint-Eustache, Paris, 11 January 1753 – 27 September 1790). Registered one day after her birth (12 January 1753) as a daughter of a certain bourgeois from Paris, called Louis Florimond de Norville, a non-existent person; the paternity of the King is suggested by later evidence. (Note: In front of the notary Mr. Arnoult, on 12 January 1772 was granted to Amélie de Norville a pension of 2,000 livres. In her marriage contract dated 30 June 1780 was accorded a pension of 3,000 livres from the Royal Treasure to Amélie and her future children. After the Bourbon Restoration, this decision was confirmed on 4 December 1815.) Married to Ange de Faure (1739–1824) on 1 June 1780, with whom she had two children.
- With Marie-Louise O'Murphy (21 October 1737 – 11 December 1814), an Irish adventuress:
  - Agathe Louise de Saint-Antoine de Saint-André (Paris, 20 May 1754 – Paris, 6 September 1774). The first illegitimate child of the King whose parentage was certain, but she was never officially recognized; in fact, she was registered as a daughter of a Louis de Saint-André, Old official of infantry and Louise-Marie de Berhini, resident of Saint-Antoine street, non-existent persons. In November 1773 she received from the King her letters of Official Recognition of Nobility (which enabled her to marry a nobleman), and funds of 223,000 livres. One month later, on 27 December 1773, she married René Jean de La Tour-du-Pin, marquis de la Charce, and died after only nine months of marriage as a consequence of a miscarriage.
  - Marguerite Victoire Le Normant de Flaghac (Riom, Puy-de-Dôme, 5 January 1768 – 25 January 1830). Officially recognized by her mother's second husband, she was probably also an illegitimate child of the King. (Note: Authors like Camille Pascal identify Marguerite Victoire as a daughter of Louis XV; the connection between the King and Marie-Louise O'Murphy having very probably known new episodes, in particular during March 1767. This paternity of Louis XV is supported by three facts: The King gave Marie-Louise O'Murphy the sum of 350,000 livres between 1771 and 1772 (Marguerite, then a three-years-old child, surpassed the dangerous first year of infancy, and Louis XV probably wanted to protect the mother of his child).; When Marguerite married firstly in 1786, the contract was entered into in the presence and with the approval of the King and Queen, and the entire royal family. This contract bears the signatures of Louis XVI, Marie Antoinette, the Count and Countess of Provence, the Count and Countess of Artois, and Madame Elizabeth.; After the Bourbon Restoration, King Charles X gave Marguerite an "annual indemnity" of 2,000 francs from his own treasure and had her entered on the Civil List for a life pension of 3,000 francs.) Married firstly on 24 February 1786 to Jean-Didier Mesnard, comte de Chousy, with whom she had two children; after her divorce following the incarceration of her husband in 1793, she then married Constant Lenormant d'Étiolles (a son of the husband of Madame de Pompadour) in November 1794, with whom she had another child.
- With Françoise de Châlus (24 February 1734 – 7 July 1821), by marriage Duchesse de Narbonne-Lara: (Note: Both children are officially recognized by their mother's husband, although it is alleged that the King himself was the real father. The coevals attribute the paternity of both children to Louis XV for, according to documents from the Military Archive, Françoise de Châlus' husband had been wounded in the War of the Austrian Succession (1747) becoming from that moment unable to have any offspring. The baptism record of Louis, Comte de Narbonne-Lara is another indication of that paternity: "On 25 of August 1755, received the baptism at the Chapel of the King, from the Very High and Very Powerful Lord, Monseigneur Charles-Antoine de La Roche-Aymon, Archbishop-Primate of Narbonne, President of the States-Generals of the Province of Languedoc, Commander of the Order of the Holy Spirit. The Godfather was the Most High and Most powerful Prince Louis Auguste of France, Duke of Berry, and the Godmother the Most High and Most Powerful Princess Madame Marie Adélaïde of France." His wife had become the King's mistress. Not only was it noted that he was named Louis but also his contemporaries remarked on the similarities between the young Louis and the King.)
  - Philippe Louis Marie Innocent Christophe Juste de Narbonne-Lara (Parma, 28 December 1750 – Paris, 10 May 1834), Duc de Narbonne-Lara. Captain of the Dragons Regiment of the Queen, Colonel of the Regiment of Forez and Field Marshal in 1790. Married on 3 February 1771 to Antoinette-Françoise-Claudine de La Roche-Aymon. No issue.
  - Louis Marie Jacques Amalric de Narbonne-Lara (Colorno, 23 August 1755 – Torgau, 17 November 1813), called Comte de Narbonne-Lara. Colonel of the Army and Honorary Chamberlain of Princess Madame Marie Adélaïde of France. In 1786 he was appointed a commander of an infantry regiment and remained in that post until the eve of the French Revolution and later served under Napoleon. Married on 16 April 1782 to Marie Adélaïde de Montholon, with whom he had two daughters. He also fathered two other children out of wedlock.
- With Marguerite Catherine Haynault (11 September 1736 – 17 March 1823):
  - Agnès Louise de Montreuil (Saint-Sulpice, Paris, 20 May 1760 – Montmelas, 2 September 1837). Registered as a daughter of a certain Louis de Montreuil, old Official of cavalry, a non-existent person, the paternity of the King is supported by other evidence. (Note: In August 1774 King Louis XVI granted her letters of Official Recognition of Nobility, and previously Louis XV secured for her capital of 223,000 livres and reported an annual revenue of 24,300 livres. In addition, Louis XVI personally signed her marriage contract.) Married on 9 December 1778 to Gaspard d'Arod de Montmelas (brother-in-law of her own mother), with whom she had four children.
  - Anne Louise de La Réale (Saint-Paul, Paris, 17 November 1762 – Saint-Germain-en-Laye, 30 April 1831). Registered as a daughter of Antoine Louis de la Réale, old Captain of cavalry, a non-existent person, the paternity of the King is supported by further evidence. (Note: In August 1774 King Louis XVI granted her letters of Official Recognition of Nobility, identical to her sister. She also received from Louis XV capital of 223,000 livres and reported annual revenue of 24,300 livres. In addition, at the age of fifteen (1777), she received the further amount of 12,000 livres as a renewed pension.) Married on 28 August 1780 to René Guillaume Paul Gabriel Etienne de Geslin, Comte de Geslin, with whom she had six children.
- With Lucie Madeleine d'Estaing (10 May 1743 – 7 April 1826), a half-sister of the Admiral d'Estaing: (Note: Both children were registered as daughters of Louis Auguste, Old Official, and citizen Lucie, both non-existent persons. In August 1774 Agnès and Aphrodite received from Louis XVI their letters of recognition of nobility (demoiselles issue de la plus ancienne noblesse de France) and following the stipulations leave by Louis XV, each of them obtained a capital of 223,000 livres and a reported annual revenue of 24,300 livres.)
  - Agnès Lucie Auguste (Paris, 14 April 1761 – Boysseulh, 4 July 1822). Married on 5 December 1777 to Charles de Boysseulh, vicomte de Boysseuilh, with whom she had three children.
  - Aphrodite Lucie Auguste (Versailles, 8 March 1763 – Artonne (Puy-de-Dôme), 22 February 1819). Married on 21 December 1784 to Jules de Boysseulh (her step-brother; son of the first marriage of her mother's husband), with whom she had one daughter.
- With Anne Coppier de Romans (19 June 1737 – 27 December 1808), Baroness de Meilly-Coulonge:
  - Louis Aimé of Bourbon (Passy, Paris, 13 January 1762 – Rome, 28 February 1787), called the Abbot of Bourbon; he was the only one of the illegitimate children of Louis XV who was officially recognized. Abbot of Saint Vincent de Metz, French Ambassador in Rome from 1785. He died of smallpox.
- With Jeanne Louise Tiercelin de La Colleterie (26 November 1746 – 5 July 1779), called Madame de Bonneval:
  - Benoît Louis Le Duc (7 February 1764 – 1837). Registered as a son of Louis Le Duc, old cavalry official and lady Julie de la Colleterie, both non-existent persons; his royal parentage was supported by later evidence. (Note: Louis XV secured for him capital of 223,000 livres who reported an annual revenue of 24,300 livres. In August 1774 Louis XVI signed a letter of Official Recognition of Nobility for him (identical to the other illegitimate children of Louis XV). In 1785 (when he took the Holy Orders) he received a dispensation from the Pope because of his illegitimate origin. After the Bourbon Restoration, Louis XVIII accorded him a pension of 6,000 francs from the Civil List, which was augmented to 20,000 francs in May 1821. Charles X (with whom he had an extraordinary physical resemblance) not only maintained his pensions but also paid his exorbitant gambling debts. In 1830 he solicited King Louis-Philippe I to secure his pensions, which the King granted.)
- With Marie Thérèse Françoise Boisselet (1731 – 1800):
  - Charles Louis Cadet de Gassicourt (23 January 1769 – 21 November 1821). Officially recognized by her mother's husband, Louis Claude Cadet de Gassicourt as his own; this story, recorded by Charles Louis' personal friend, Baron Paul Thiébault in his Memoirs, was challenged by later historiography, but later reasserted by modern works.

== Ancestry ==
Ancestors of Louis XV

8. Louis XIV of France
4. Louis, Dauphin of France
9. Maria Theresa of Austria
2. Louis, Duke of Burgundy
10. Ferdinand Maria, Elector of Bavaria
5. Maria Anna Victoria of Bavaria
11. Henriette Adelaide of Savoy
1. Louis XV of France
12. Charles Emmanuel II, Duke of Savoy
6. Victor Amadeus II of Sardinia
13. Marie Jeanne Baptiste of Savoy
3. Marie Adélaïde of Savoy
14. Philippe I, Duke of Orléans
7. Anne Marie of Orléans
15. Henrietta of England

== Portrayal in film and television ==
Film	Year	Actor	as Madame du Barry	as Marie Antoinette	as Madame de Pompadour
Madame Du Barry	1917	Charles Clary	Theda Bara	none	none
Madame Dubarry	1919	Emil Jannings	Pola Negri	none	none
Du Barry, Woman of Passion	1930	William Farnum	Norma Talmadge	none	none
Madame Pompadour	1931	Kurt Gerron	none	none	Anny Ahlers
Madame Du Barry	1934	Reginald Owen	Dolores del Río	Anita Louise	none
Marie Antoinette	1938	John Barrymore	Gladys George	Norma Shearer	none
DuBarry Was a Lady	1943	Red Skelton	Lucille Ball	none	none
Black Magic	1949	Robert Atkins	Margot Grahame	Nancy Guild	none
Royal Affairs in Versailles	1954	Jean Marais	none	Lana Marconi	Micheline Presle
Madame Du Barry	1954	André Luguet	Martine Carol	Isabelle Pia	none
The Rose of Versailles (anime TV series)	1979–80	Hisashi Katsuta	Ryōko Kinomiya	Miyuki Ueda	none
Le Chevalier D'Eon	2006	Tetsu Inada (Japanese) / Jay Hickman (English)	none	none	Mayumi Yanagisawa (Japanese) / Shelley Calene-Black (English)
Marie Antoinette	2006	Rip Torn	Asia Argento	Kirsten Dunst	none
Doctor Who "The Girl in the Fireplace"	2006	Ben Turner	none	none	Sophia Myles
Outlander Season 2 (episodes 2,5,7)	2016	Lionel Lingelser	none	none	none
The Royal Exchange	2017	Igor van Dessel	none	none	none
Marie Antoinette	2022	James Purefoy	Gaia Weiss	Emilia Schüle	not applicable - set after her death
Jeanne Du Barry	2023	Johnny Depp	Maïwenn	Pauline Pollmann	none

== See also ==
- Louis XV Style
- Louis XV furniture
- Rocaille
- List of French monarchs
- Persecution of Huguenots under Louis XV
- Kingdom of Navarre
- Cabriole leg
- Étienne François, Duc de Choiseul
- Suppression of the Jesuits
- Louis heel, a shoe heel shape named after Louis XV.
- Mesdames de France
- Madame du Barry
- Outline of France
- List of famous big game hunters

== Sources ==
- Duke of Saint-Simon, Mémoires, Book 12, Chapter 15.
- Marquis Philippe de Dangeau, Journal; 1856–60, Paris; XVI, 136; in Olivier Bernier, Louis the Beloved, The Life of Louis XV: 1984, Garden City, New York: Doubleday and Company. p. 3.
- The scene is described in Olivier Bernier, Louis the Beloved, The Life of Louis XV: 1984, Garden City, New York: Doubleday and Company. p. 17.

== Bibliography ==
- Adams, Tracy (2014). Christine de Pizan and the Fight for France. University Park, Pennsylvania: Pennsylvania State University Press. ISBN 978-0-2710-6457-4.
- Algrant, Christine Pevitt (2002). Madame de Pompadour: Mistress of France. New York: Grove Press. ISBN 978-0-8021-4035-7.
- Antoine, Michel (1989). Louis XV (in French). Paris: Hachette Pluriel. ISBN 2-0101-7818-1.
- Backhouse, Roger E. (1994). Economists and the Economy: The Evolution of Economic Ideas (2nd ed.). New Brunswick: Transaction Publishers. ISBN 1-5600-0715-X.
- Bernier, Olivier (1984). Louis the Beloved: the Life of Louis XV. New York: Doubleday. ISBN 978-0-3851-8402-1.
- Black, Jeremy (2013). From Louis XIV to Napoleon: The Fate of a Great Power. London: Routledge. ISBN 978-1-1353-5764-1.
- Bluche, François (2003). Louis XV (in French). Paris: Éditions Perrin. ISBN 978-2-2620-2021-7.
- Blum, Jerome (1970). The European World: A History (2nd ed.). Boston: Little, Brown. ISBN 978-0-3161-0027-4.
- Chaussinard-Nogaret, Guy (1985). The French Nobility in the Eighteenth Century: From Feudalism to Enlightenment. Cambridge: Cambridge University Press. ISBN 978-0-5212-7590-3.
- Cornette, Joël (1993). Histoire de la France: Absolutisme et Lumières 1652-1783 (in French). Paris: Hachette. ISBN 978-2-0102-1185-0.
- de Castries, René de La Croix duc (1979). The Lives of the Kings & Queens of France. New York: Alfred A. Knopf. ISBN 978-0-3945-0734-7.
- Davies, Norman (1996). Europe: A History. London: The Bodley Head. ISBN 978-0-1982-0171-7.
- Flahaut, Jean (2002). Charles-Louis Cadet de Gassicourt, Bâtard Royal, Pharmacien de l'Empereur (in French). Paris: Teissèdre. ISBN 978-2-9122-5960-8.
- Flahaut, Simone (1980). Le pharmacien Charles-Louis Cadet de Gassicourt, bâtard de Louis XV, et sa famille (in French). Paris: Société d'histoire de la pharmacie. ISBN 978-2-9122-5960-8.
- de Goncourt, Edmond et Jules (1906). La Duchesse de Châteauroux et Ses Soeurs (in French). Paris: Bibliotheque Nationale.
- Ducher, Robert (1988). Caractéristique des Styles (in French). Paris: Flammarion. ISBN 2-0801-1539-1.
- Gombrich, E.H. (2005). A Little History of the World. New Haven: Yale University Press. ISBN 978-0-3001-3207-6.
- Guéganic, Anne-Laure (2008). Louis XV: Le Règne fastueux (in French). Paris: Éditions Atlas. ISBN 978-2-7312-3798-6.
- Haslip, Joan (1992). Madame du Barry: The Wages of Beauty. New York: Grove Weidenfeld. ISBN 978-1-8504-3753-6.
- Herbermann, Charles George (1913). Catholic Encyclopedia. New York: The Encyclopedia Press.
- HRH Princess Michael of Kent (2005). Cupid and the King. New York: Touchstone. ISBN 978-0-7432-7086-1.
- Jones, Colin (2003). The Great Nation: France from Louis XV to Napoleon. New York: Penguin Books. ISBN 978-0-1401-3093-5.
- Latour, Louis Therese (1927). Princesses Ladies And Salonnieres of The Reign of Louis XV.
- Le Roy Ladurie, Emmanuel (1998). The Ancien Régime: A History of France, 1610–1774. Oxford: Wiley Blackwell. ISBN 978-0-6312-1196-9.
- Lepage, Jean-Denis G. G. (2009). French Fortifications, 1715–1815: An Illustrated History. McFarland. ISBN 978-0-7864-5807-3.
- Lever, Evelyne (2013). Le Crépuscule des Rois – Chronique 1757–1789 (in French). Paris: Fayard. ISBN 978-2-2136-6837-6.
- Rogister, John (1998). Louis XV and the Parlement of Paris, 1737–55. Cambridge: Cambridge University Press. ISBN 978-0-5214-0395-5.
- Pascal, Camille (2006). Le goût du roi, Louis XV et Marie-Louise O'Murphy (in French). Paris: Perrin. ISBN 2-2620-1704-2.
- Shennan, J.H. (1995). France Before the Revolution. Routledge. ISBN 978-0-4151-1945-0.
- Viguerie, Jean de (1995). Histoire et Dictionnaire du Temps des Lumières (in French). Paris: Robert Lafont. ISBN 978-2-2210-4810-8.
- Vrignault, Henri (1950). Les Enfants de Louis XV: Descendance Illégitime (in French). Paris: éditions Perrin.

=== Further reading ===
- Engels, Jens Ivo. "Denigrer, Esperer, Assumer La Realite. Le Roi de France perçu par ses Sujets, 1680–1750" ["Disparaging, Hoping, Taking on Reality: the French King as Perceived by His Subjects, 1680–1750"]. Revue D'histoire Moderne et Contemporaine 2003 50(3): 96–126, in French
- Gooch, G.P. Louis XV (1976), scholarly biography
- Justus, Kevin Lane. "A Fractured Mirror: The Royal Portraiture of Louis XV and the Search for a Successful Image through Architecture, or, Versailles Is the Thing in Which We Will Catch the Character of the King." PhD dissertation U. of North Carolina, Chapel Hill 2002. DAI 2003 63(11): 3766-A. DA3070864 Fulltext: ProQuest Dissertations & Theses
- Perkins, James Breck. France under Louis XV (2 vol 1897) online vol 1; online vol 2
- Treasure, Geoffrey. The Making of Modern Europe, 1648–1780 (3rd ed. 2003). pp 297–331. online
- Woodbridge, John D. Revolt in Prerevolutionary France: The Prince de Conti's Conspiracy against Louis XV (1995).
- Scholarly bibliography by Colin Jones (2002)

=== Mistresses ===
- Jones, Colin. Madame de Pompadour: Images of a Mistress. London: National Gallery Publ., 2002.
- Lever, Evelyne. Madame de Pompadour. (2002)
- Mitford, Nancy. Madame de Pompadour (1954)

=== Primary sources ===
- Du Barry, Jeanne Vaubernier, Jeanne Baecu. Memoirs of the Comtesse Du Barry: With Minute Details of Her Entire Career as Favorite of Louis XV (1903) ISBN 1-4069-2313-3

Louis XV House of Bourbon Cadet branch of the Capetian dynasty Born: 15 February 1710 Died: 10 May 1774
Regnal titles
Preceded by Louis XIV	King of France and Co-Prince of Andorra; 1 September 1715 – 10 May 1774	Succeeded by Louis XVI
French royalty
Preceded by Louis, Duke of Brittany	Dauphin of France; 8 March 1712 – 1 September 1715	Succeeded by Louis Ferdinand
