= Louis, Duke of Burgundy (disambiguation) =

Louis, Duke of Burgundy (1682–1712) was the eldest son of Louis, Grand Dauphin and grandson of Louis XIV.

Louis, Duke of Burgundy may also refer to:

- Louis, Duke of Burgundy (born 1751), died 1761, eldest son of Louis, Dauphin of France and Princess Maria Josepha of Saxony, Dauphine of France
- Prince Louis, Duke of Burgundy (b. 2010), elder twin son of Louis Alphonse, Duke of Anjou
