= Anne Baptiste Nivelon =

Anne Baptiste Nivelon, née Féret (c. 1711–1786), was a French painter active in Versailles in the mid-18th century, known for her portraits of members of the royal court.

== Life ==
Anne Féret, later known as Anne Baptiste Nivelon, was born circa 1711 to Jean-Baptiste Féret, a landscape and history painter agréé at the Académie royale de peinture et de sculpture, and Marie-Anne Thibert.

In January 1741, she married François Nivelon at a ceremony attended by prominent members of the French nobility, including the Comte de Gramont, the Maréchale d’Estrées, the Comtesse de Mailly, and the Comtesse de Vintimille. The couple lived in Versailles on rue de Satory.

Around the mid-18th century, Nivelon became active as an artist, with her most notable works dating from 1750 to 1764. She worked largely for members of the court. Nivelon likely adopted the name Baptiste, which does not appear in civil records, in reference to her father, a court painter to the king. Her adoption of two names typically used for men during the Ancien régime later caused confusion about her gender.

Following her husband’s death in 1770, Nivelon appears to have continued her artistic work until her later years. She died on 16 February 1786, at the age of approximately 74, and was buried the following day.

== Works ==
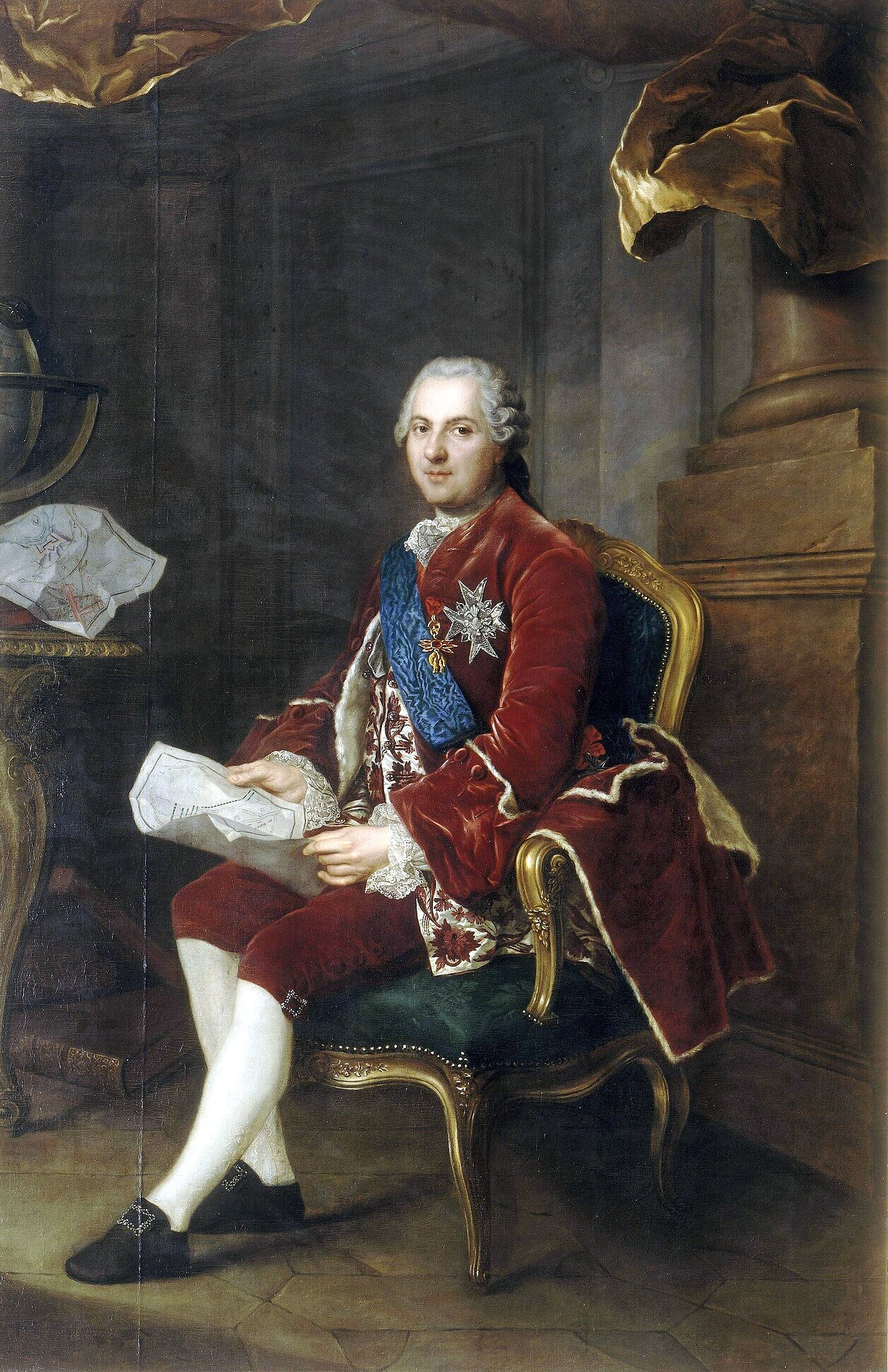
Louis de France, Dauphin (1764), Chambre de Madame Victoire, Château de Versailles

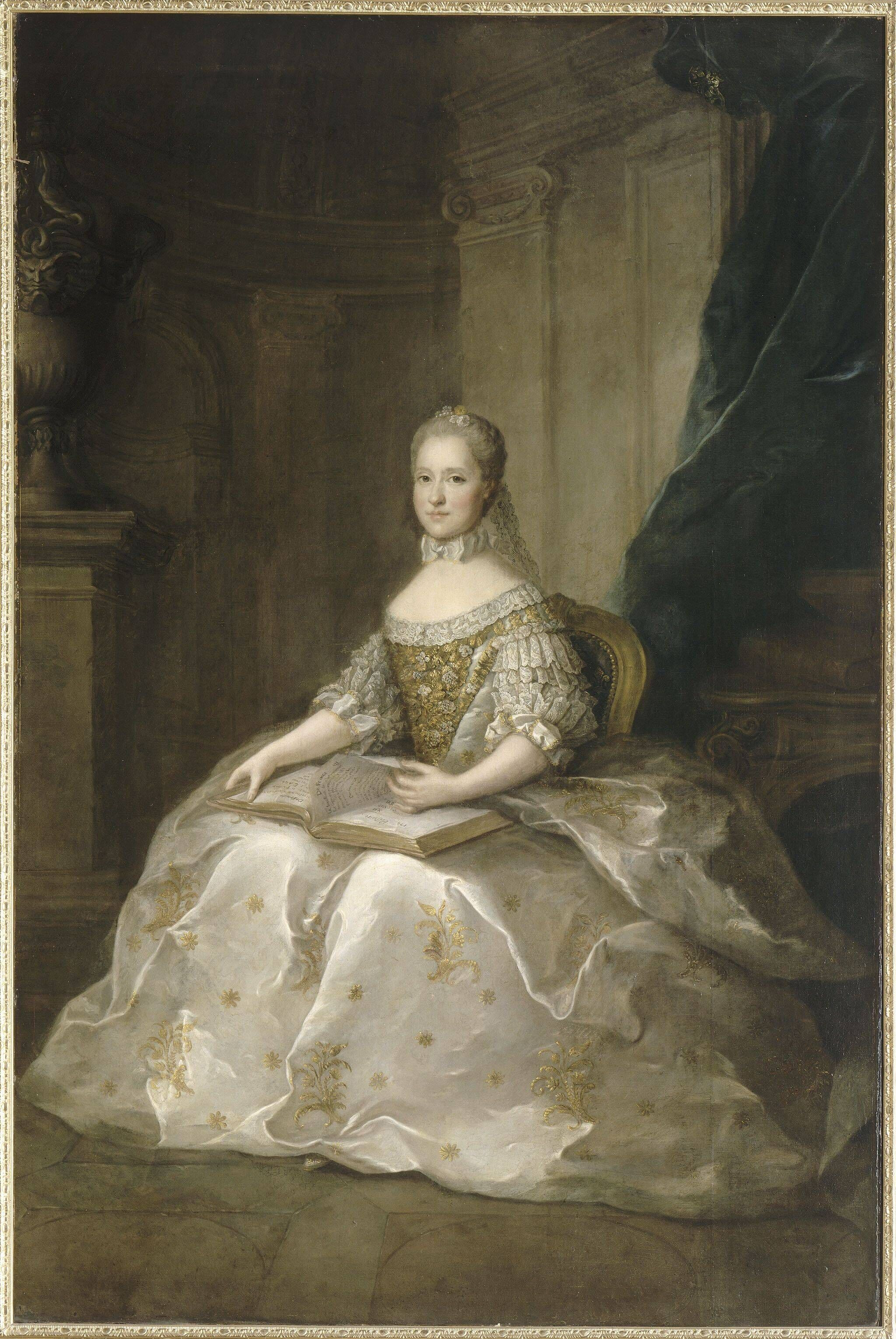
Marie-Josèphe of Saxony (1764), Chambre de Madame Victoire, Château de Versailles

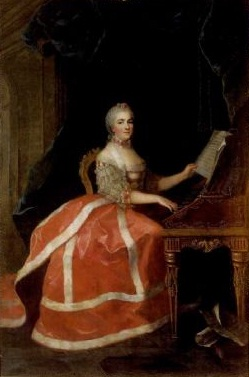
Victoire de France playing the harpsichord

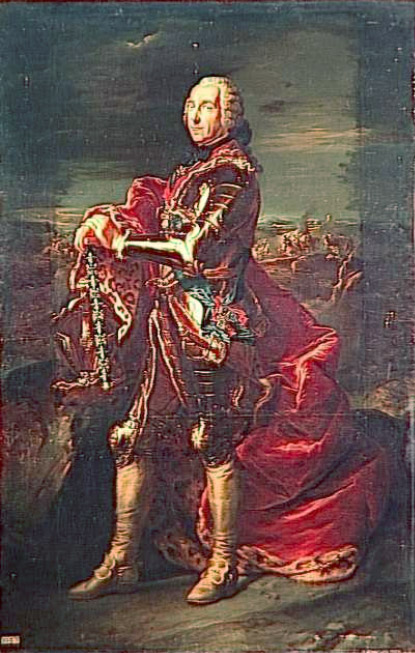
Charles Louis Auguste Fouquet, Duke of Belle-Isle (portrait)
