= Marie Zéphyrine of France =

French princess (died in childhood; 1750–1755)

- la petite madame
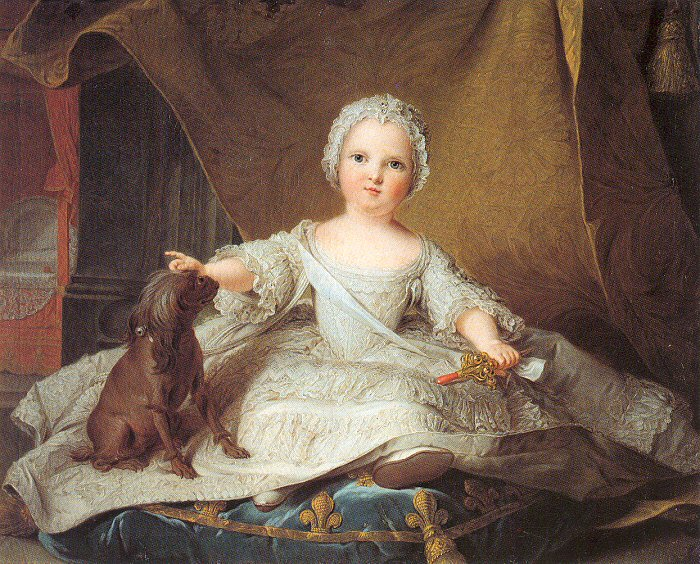
- Portrait by Jean-Marc Nattier, 1751
- Born: 26 August 1750; Palace of Versailles, Kingdom of France
- Died: 2 September 1755 (aged 5); Palace of Versailles, Kingdom of France
- Burial: Basilica of St Denis
- House: Bourbon
- Father: Louis, Dauphin of France
- Mother: Maria Josepha of Saxony

Marie Zéphyrine of France (26 August 1750 – 2 September 1755) was a daughter (princess) of France as the daughter of Louis, Dauphin of France and Maria Josepha of Saxony and granddaughter of King Louis XV. She was known as la petite Madame.

== Life ==
Marie Zéphyrine was born at the Palace of Versailles on the feast day of Pope Saint Zephyrinus after whom she would be named. Before her, the dauphine had given birth to two dead sons, which raised concerns about her ability to deliver healthy children. Maria Josepha was sent to the spa of Forges-les-Eaux to promote her fertility; the court hoped for a son to ensure the continuity of the House of Bourbon, as the dauphin was the only son of King Louis XV. A painting was even ordered to commemorate the birth of a healthy son in advance, which had to be re-touched when a girl was born instead. In the morning of 26 August, when the dauphine went into labour, the king was awakened and rushed to her room, as did 'all who were in Versailles'; some courtiers were present in their dressing gowns. When she was born at six in the evening, Marie Zéphyrine's sex caused general disappointment. Official festivities were ordered, but reportedly no 'joy' or 'pleasure' was displayed by Parisians.

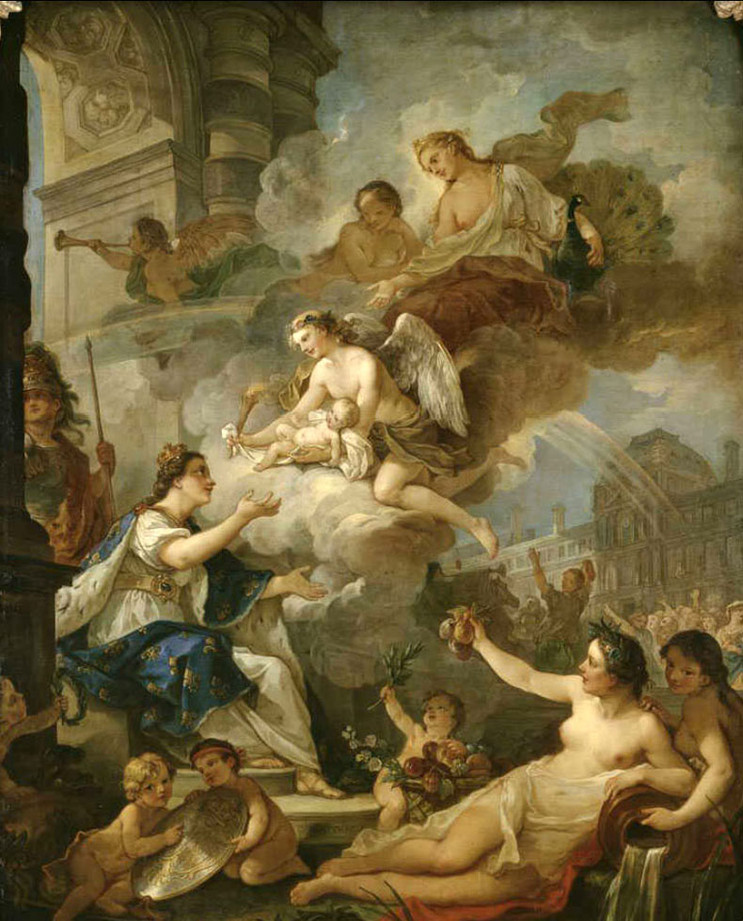
The painting ordered to commemorate the son expected instead of Marie Zéphyrine; in the end, it was turned into an allegory of her birth.

According to the customs of her family, she was not fully baptised or named at birth. The short ceremony of ondoiement was performed by the grand almoner of France, Cardinal de Soubise. It consisted only of the sprinkling of holy water accompanied by the formula 'I thee baptise in the name of the Father, the Son, and the Holy Spirit'. Throughout her life, she was known as la petite Madame or Madame; she was baptised the day before her death, and received the name Marie Zéphyrine only then.

She was placed into the care of the duchess of Tallard, born Marie Isabelle de Rohan, who had been appointed governess of the Children of France in 1735 and had raised three of the dauphin's sisters. In the next years, she was joined by three brothers, Louis Joseph Xavier, Duke of Burgundy, Xavier Marie Joseph, Duke of Aquitaine, who died after five months, and Louis Auguste, Duke of Berry, the future King Louis XVI. She would become very close with the one closest to her in age, Burgundy.

Marie Zéphyrine greatly resembled her mother, but she was of a weak condition. In June 1751, when she was ten months old, a friend of her mother described her as 'lively and pretty', having eight teeth. She was rarely mentioned by her contemporaries, but what was written down shows the dauphine to have been an attentive and loving mother. In September 1753 when she had given birth to the duke of Aquitaine, she was overjoyed when her three children were brought to her bed, and caressed them many times.

Description of Marie Zéphyrine by her mother

She is very small and even more delicate, she is very ugly, they say she resembles me like two drops of water [resemble each other], and she is very wilful and mean, like a little dragon.

In February 1754, Marie Zéphyrine reportedly 'enjoyed the most perfect health' and had already attended the public dinner of the royal family a few times. She was described as charming quick-witted, and especially liked to dance. A scene was relayed in which she 'looked longingly' at a medal that her grandfather the king was presenting to a foreign dignitiary; her brother Burgundy immediately offered his own ribbon to Marie Zéphyrine.

=== Death ===
Although she had been a healthy child before, Marie Zéphyrine displayed worrying symptoms in May 1754: she stopped walking and seemed unable to stand up. She could still sleep and had a good appetite, but the doctors were worried, as they could offer no explanation for the deterioration in her movement. She might have suffered of faltering growth or childhood arthritis, which the medications offered by the doctors did not alleviate.

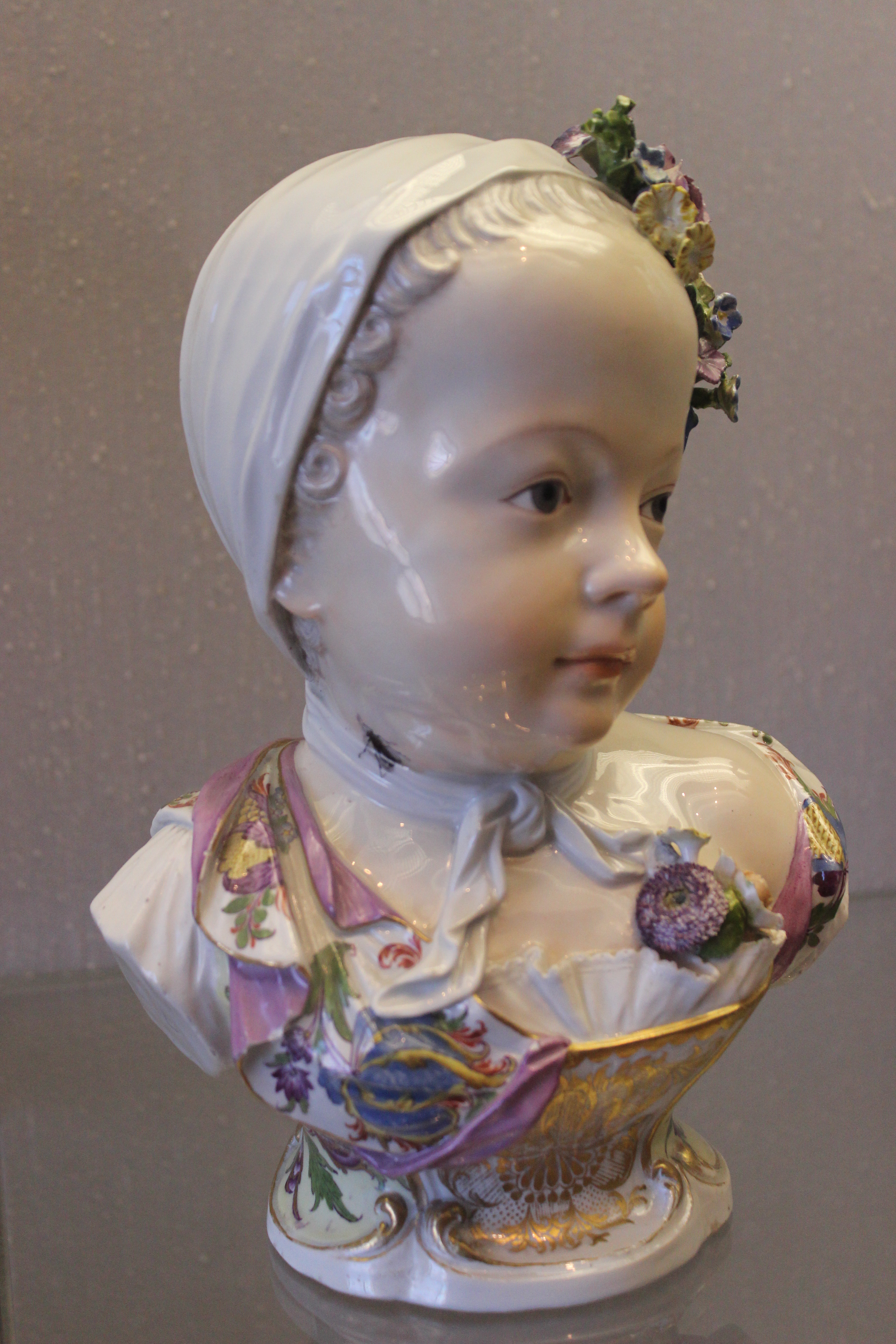
Her portrait in Meissen porcelain.

On 30 August 1755, Marie Zéphyrine suffered convulsions, probably as a result of peritonitis. She was quickly baptised on 1 September and died a few hours later, at half past midnight on 2 September at Versailles. Her parents were 'overwhelmed by grief'. The evening of her death, her body was taken to the Tuileries Palace accompanied by twelve guards who were stationed there as long as she lay in the building. Her heart was buried in Church of the Val-de-Grâce and her body in the necropolis of the kings of France in the Basilica of Saint-Denis Her funeral was modelled on that of her elder half-sister who had died in 1748, and her cortège was led by Louise Diane, Princess of Conti and the princess of Chimay. She was grieved deeply by her family, but no court mourning was ordered, as a daughter of France could only be mourned after she had turned seven. At the time of her death, her mother was pregnant, and she gave birth to Louis Stanislaus Xavier, Count of Provence, the future Louis XVIII in November 1755. Afterwards, her parents had two stillborn sons and three living children born to them, including the future Charles X.

The graves in Saint-Denis were robbed and desecrated during the French Revolution to celebrate its first anniversary. The tomb of Marie Zéphyrine was among the eleven exhumated on 15 October 1793, and her remains were thrown into a pit containing the bones of Bourbons and covered with quick lime. In 1817, during the Bourbon Restoration, her brother Louis XVIII placed the fragmented, unidentifiable remains of his family into two ossuaries inside the basilica.

== Ancestry ==
Ancestors of Marie Zéphyrine of France

8. Louis, Duke of Burgundy
4. Louis XV of France
9. Marie Adélaïde of Savoy
2. Louis, Dauphin of France
10. Stanisław I Leszczyński
5. Marie Leszczyńska
11. Katarzyna Opalińska
1. Marie Zéphyrine of France
12. Augustus II of Poland
6. Augustus III of Poland
13. Christiane Eberhardine of Bayreuth
3. Maria Josepha of Saxony
14. Joseph I, Holy Roman Emperor
7. Maria Josepha of Austria
15. Wilhelmine Amalia of Brunswick

== Sources ==
=== Books ===
- Brunel, Yvonne (2016) [1960, by Beauchesne et ses fils]. La mère de Louis XVI, Marie-Josèphe de Saxe, Dauphine de France (in French). Paris: Frédérique Patat. ISBN 9782373240535. OCLC 3143595 – via Google Books.
- Dussieux, Louis; Soulié, Eudore, eds. (1862). Mémoires du duc de Luynes sur la cour de Louis XV (1735–1758) (in French). Vol. 10. Paris: Firmin Diot Frères, Fils et Compagnie, Libraires. OCLC 1070565049 – via Google Books.
- Dussieux, Louis; Soulié, Eudore, eds. (1864). Mémoires du duc de Luynes sur la cour de Louis XV (1735–1758) (in French). Vol. 14. Paris: Firmin Diot Frères, Fils et Compagnie, Libraires. OCLC 1072048421 – via Google Books.
- Eckstaedt, Comte C.-F. Vitzthum d', ed. (1867). "La lune rousse, puis la lune de miel. 1747–1767" [The Red Moon, Then The Honeymoon. 1747–1767]. Maurice Comte de Saxe et Marie-Josèphe de Saxe, Dauphine de France. Lettres et documents inédits des Archives de Dresde [Maurice, Count of Saxony and Maria Josepha of Saxony, Dauphine of France. Unedited Letters and Documents from the Archives of Drezden] (in French). Leipzig: Ludwig Denicke. pp. 175–223. OCLC 563568022 – via Internet Archive.
- Heylli, Georges d' (1872). Les tombes royales de Saint-Denis : histoire et nomenclature des tombeaux, extraction des cercueils royaux en 1793, ce qu'ils contenaient, les Prussiens dans la basilique en 1871. Paris: Librairie générale – via BNF Gallica.
- Spawforth, Tony (2008). Versailles: A Biography of a Palace. St. Martin's Publishing Group. ISBN 9780312357856. OCLC 213451442 – via Google Books.

=== Web pages ===
- Geeraert, Anaïs (3 April 2019). "Marie-Zéphyrine, sœur de Louis XVI". Histoire et Secrets (in French).
