= Clotilde of France =

Queen of Sardinia from 1796 to 1802

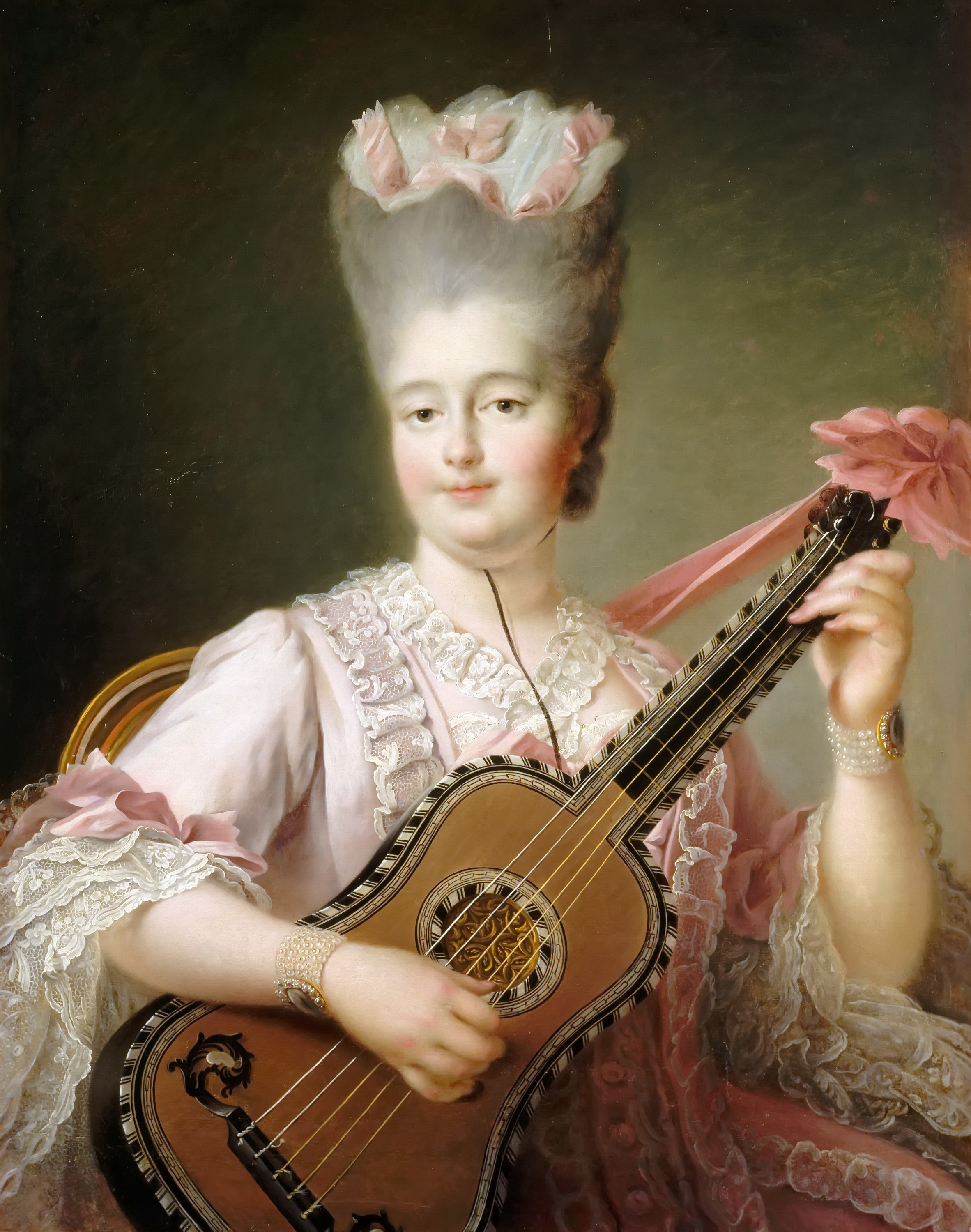
- Clotilde playing the guitar, c. 1775

Queen consort of Sardinia
- Tenure: 16 October 1796 – 7 March 1802
- Born: 23 September 1759; Palace of Versailles, Versailles, Kingdom of France
- Died: 7 March 1802 (aged 42); Naples, Kingdom of Naples
- Burial: 11 March 1802; Church of Santa Caterina a Chiaia
- Spouse: Charles Emmanuel IV (m. 1775)
Names
- Marie Adélaïde Clotilde Xavière de France
- House: Bourbon (by birth); Savoy (by marriage)
- Father: Louis, Dauphin of France
- Mother: Maria Josepha of Saxony

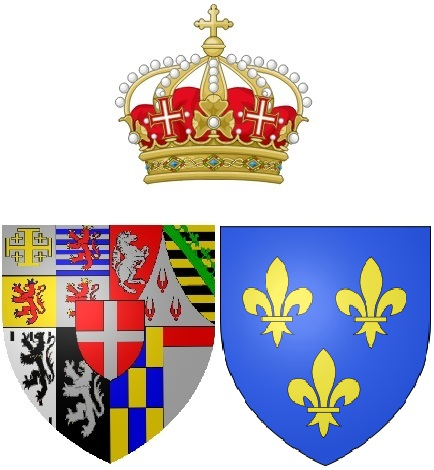
- Coat of arms of Queen Clotilde of France

Marie Clotilde of France (Marie Adélaïde Clotilde Xavière; 23 September 1759 – 7 March 1802), known as Clotilde in Italy, was Queen of Sardinia by marriage to Charles Emmanuel IV of Sardinia. She was a younger sister of Louis XVI of France. She was politically active and acted as the de facto first minister of her spouse during his reign. She has been declared venerable by Pope Pius VII.

== Princess of France ==
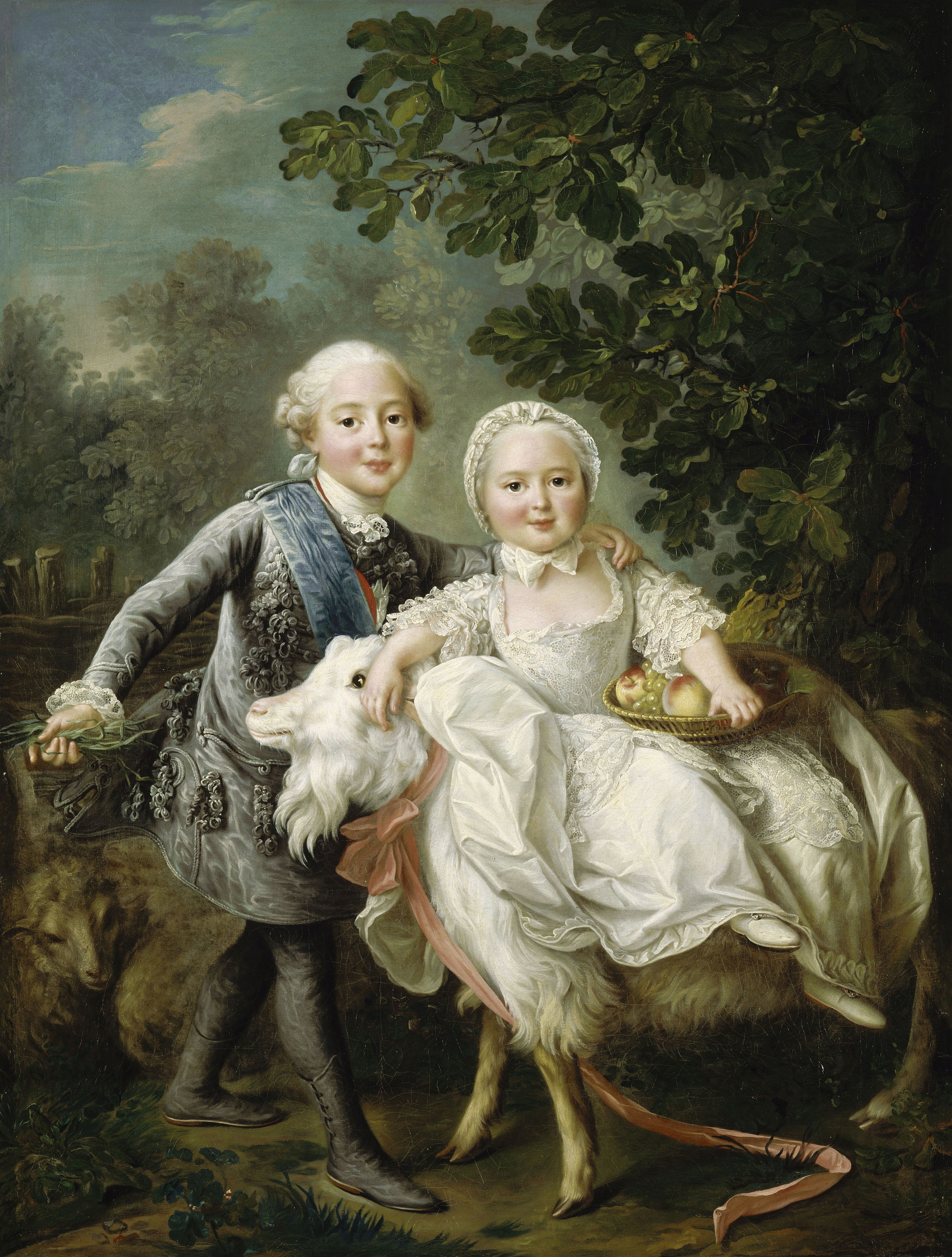
Clotilde and her elder brother Charles with a goat

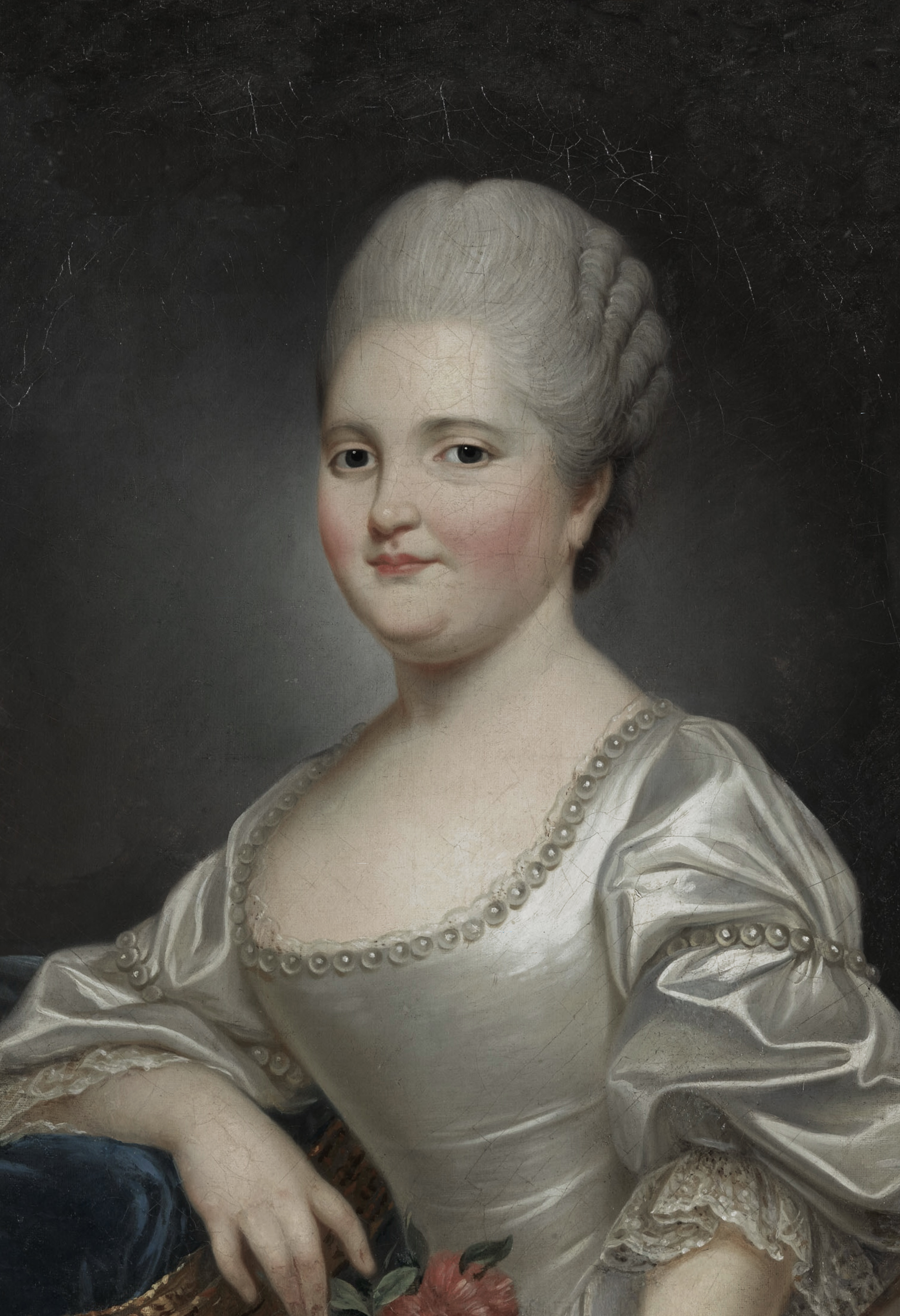
Clotilde by Joseph Ducreux, c. 1773

Born in Versailles, Clotilde was the elder daughter of Louis, Dauphin of France, the only son of King Louis XV and his wife, Queen Marie Leszczyńska, and Princess Maria Josepha of Saxony. As the daughter of the Dauphin, she was a Fille de France (Daughter of France), and as the granddaughter of Louis XV, she was also a Petite-fille de France (Granddaughter of France). Upon the death of their grandfather in May 1774, Clotilde's oldest brother, Louis-Auguste, became King Louis XVI.

Clotilde and her younger sister Élisabeth were raised by Madame de Marsan, Governess to the Children of France. The sisters were considered much dissimilar in personality. Because she was overweight, Clotilde was nicknamed Gros-Madame in her youth. They were given the usual education of royal princesses in that time, focusing upon accomplishments, religion and virtue, an education to which Clotilde reportedly willingly subjected herself. They were tutored botany by M. Lemonnier, history and geography lessons by M. Leblond, and religion by Abbe de Montigat, Canon of Chartres, and they followed the court between the royal palaces with their days divided between studies, walks in the park, or drives in the forest.

While Clotilde was described as a docile pupil, "who made herself loved by all who approached her", Élisabeth long refused to study, stating that "there were always people at hand whose duty it was to think for Princes", and treated her staff with impatience. Because of their difference, Madame de Marsan, who was not able to handle Élisabeth, preferred Clotilde, which made Élisabeth jealous and created a rift between the sisters. Their relationship improved when Élisabeth fell ill and Clotilde insisted upon nursing her; during that time, Clotilde taught Élisabeth the alphabet and gave her an interest in religion. Clotilde came to be Élisabeth's good friend, tutor and counselor.

Clotilde did not have a good relationship with her sister-in-law Marie Antoinette, who reportedly demonstrated too openly that she preferred her sister Élisabeth, which caused some offense at court.

== Marriage ==
Clotilde adapted herself to strict Catholic devotion early on and had the wish to follow the example of her aunt, Madame Louise, and join the Order of the Carmelites. Instead, however, Clotilde was in February 1775 officially engaged by her brother King Louis XVI to Charles Emmanuel, Prince of Piedmont, eldest son of Victor Amadeus III of Sardinia and Maria Antonia Ferdinanda of Spain. The match between Clotilde and Charles Emmanuel was part of a wider series of Franco-Savoyard dynastic marriages taking place in a time span of eight years: after the wedding between Charles Emmanuel's cousin Princess Marie Louise of Savoy and her relative Louis Alexandre, Prince of Lamballe in 1767, Charles Emmanuel's sister Marie Joséphine, had married Clotilde's older brother, the Count of Provence in 1771, and another of Charles Emmanuel's sisters, Marie Thérèse, had married Clotilde's youngest brother, the Count of Artois in 1773. Clotilde did not wish to marry, but adjusted herself to the will of her brother. She asked the Princess de Lamballe about the personality of her intended spouse, and was taught Italian in order to fulfill her role as eventual Queen of Sardinia.

On 12 June 1775, Clotilde attended the coronation of her brother Louis XVI in Reims. On 8 August, the ambassador of Sardinia, count de Viry, presented the official proposal to Clotilde from Charles Emmanuel, and on the 16th, the official engagement was announced to the royal court. On 21 August 1775, Louis XVI had his sister Clotilde married in Versailles by procuration to Charles Emmanuel, Prince of Piedmont, with her second eldest brother the Count of Provence as proxy for the groom, and with Cardinal de la Roche-Aymon officiating at the ceremony.

Clotilde departed from Versailles on 27 August and separated from the King, Queen and her sister at Choisy, before continuing with her brother the Count of Provence. The farewell between the sisters was described as intense, with Élisabeth hardly able to tear herself from the arms of Clotilde; Queen Marie Antoinette commented: "My sister Élisabeth is a charming child, who has intelligence, character, and much grace; she showed the greatest feeling, and much above her age, at the departure of her sister. The poor little girl was in despair, and as her health is very delicate, she was taken ill and had a very severe nervous attack. I own to my dear mamma that I fear I am getting too attached to her, feeling, from the example of my aunts, how essential it is for her happiness not to remain an old maid in this country."

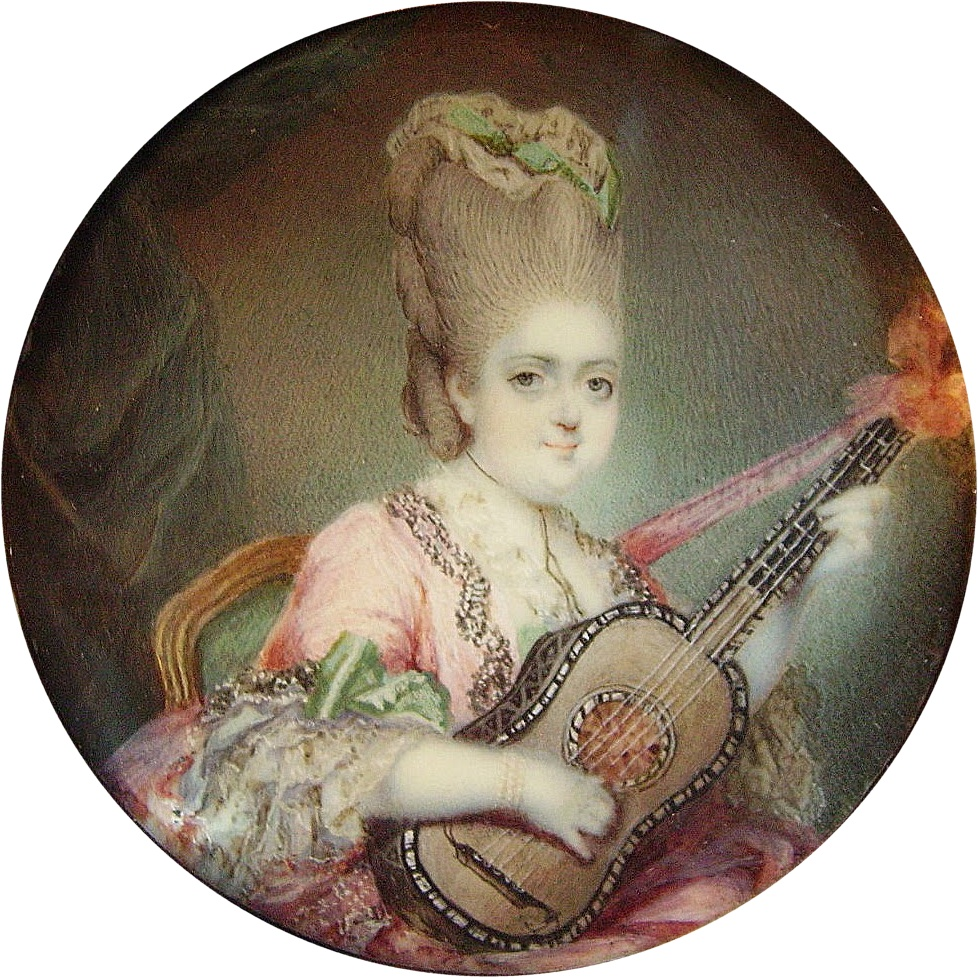
Marie Clotilde of France (Madame Clotilde) with a guitar after François Hubert Drouais

In Lyon, Clotilde made herself popular by her successful request to grant an amnesty to the imprisoned deserters in the town prison, before finally arriving at the border at Pont-de-Beauvoisin on 5 September. There, she was separated from her French entourage and ceremoniously transferred by count de Clermont-Tonnerre to count de Viry and her new Italian household, notably her new lady-in-waiting Madama Theresa Balbi, who was to become her favourite until her death. Having crossed the border with her new court, she was introduced to Charles Emmanuel.

Accompanied by her brother the Count of Provence and her husband, she was introduced to her father-in-law at Les Échelles and to her mother-in-law and the rest of the Sardinian court at Chambéry, before making her formal entrance to Turin on the 30 September. The official wedding took place in Turin. At the occasion of her marriage, there were comments in the French court that her groom had been given two brides instead of one, in reference to her weight. Her father-in-law was concerned that her weight might affect her ability to bear children. The groom reportedly commented that he had been given "more to worship".

== Princess of Piedmont ==
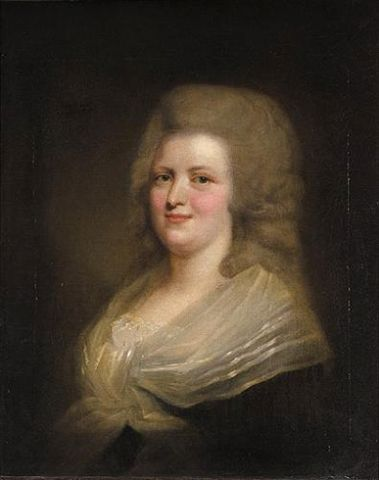
Portrait of Clotilde by Johann Julius Heinsius, c. 1780

Clotilde established a good relationship to her new family and became popular with the public. Her father-in-law came to refer to her as an angel of peace because of her frequent mediating between quarreling family members, particularly between him and her spouse. She quickly and successfully adapted to the strict court rules of her fervently Catholic mother-in-law Queen Maria Antonia, dutifully participated in all representational activities expected of her in her role as crown princess, and demonstrated that the strict morals at court would be as stringently upheld in her future tenure as queen as they were by the current queen. She was close to her sisters-in-law, the Duchess of Aosta and the Duchess of Chablais. She was well liked by the members of her household for her consideration for them, and her piety and frequent private worship established her reputation of piety among the public. During her first years in Savoy, she enjoyed fashion and entertainment and, despite her saintly reputation, her spouse himself said that it was in fact not her nature to be humble and submissive, and that she had to struggle to achieve this.

Although the union was arranged for political reasons, Clotilde and Charles Emmanuel became devoted to each other, united in their piety and a strong belief in the Catholic faith. She played the guitar to his singing, they studied religious texts together, and enjoyed spending time at Moncalieri Castle and the Palace of Venaria to relax from the court etiquette. The marriage was to be childless. Concerns was raised that her difficulty to conceive was due to her weight, and during the course of her first years of marriage, she was subjected to a number of fertility treatments, among those being a diet that caused her to lose a great deal of weight. In 1779, there was a sign of pregnancy that proved to be false, and in 1783, after eight years of attempts to have issue, Clotilde asked Charles Emmanuel to end sexual relations and live in chastity as uti frater et soror, a request he willingly agreed to. Charles Emmanuel, being of passive character, leaned on Clotilde as a stronger personality, and she came to have a great influence upon him as a stabilizing factor and adviser, and she acted as a mediator during his conflicts with his father the King, often caused by Charles Emmanuel's nervous difficulties, a condition Clotilde took it upon herself to hide from others and stabilize.

The French Revolution proved to be a disaster for her family. Her youngest brother, the Count of Artois, left France in 1789 and was given permission by Turin to stay there under the protection of her father-in-law, the King of Sardinia. Clotilde also harboured Louis Joseph, Prince of Condé, Louise de Condé, Louis Antoine, Duke of Enghien, as well as, in March 1791, her aunts Mesdames de France, Madame Adélaïde and Madame Victoire. After the departure of her brother the Count of Artois, her sister-in-law, the Countess of Artois, sank into a depression and contemplated to become a nun, but was persuaded not to by Clotilde, who pointed out her duty to her children. During this period, Turin was filled with aristocratic French émigrés, who were greatly disliked by the public in Piedmont and also caused Piedmont to be regarded as an enemy by the government in Paris, and Clotilde was placed in a difficult situation, as her charitable activity among the French emigré community was noted.

In the 1790s, Clotilde was described by the exiled Élisabeth Vigée Le Brun as remarkably changed in her appearance as well as personality. As Vigée Le Brun's stay in Italy occurred between 1789 and 1792, and was granted audience to Clotilde by letters of introduction by the Mesdames de France, the meeting likely took place in 1791 or 1792, despite the fact that Vigée Le Brun - perhaps in retrospect - referred to Clotilde and her spouse as king and queen, while they were in fact still Prince and Princess of Piedmont at this point:

"The two aunts of Louis XVI had been kind enough to give me letters to Clotilde, Queen of Sardinia, their niece. They sent word that they very much wished to have a portrait done by me, and consequently, as soon as I was settled, I presented myself before Her Majesty. She received me very well after reading the letters of Princess Adelaide and Princess Victoria. She told me that she regretted having to refuse her aunts, but that, having renounced the world altogether, she must decline being painted. What I saw indeed seemed quite in accord with her statement and her resolve. The Queen of Sardinia had her hair cut short and wore on her head a little cap, which, like the rest of her garb, was the simplest conceivable. Her leanness struck me particularly, as I had seen her when she was very young, before her marriage, when her stoutness was so pronounced that she was called "Fat Milady" in France. Be it that this change was caused by too austere religious practices, or by the sufferings which the misfortunes of her family had made her undergo, the fact was that she had altered beyond recognition. The King joined her in the room where she received me. He was likewise so pale and thin that it was painful to look at them together."

Her oldest brother, King Louis XVI, her sister-in-law, Queen Marie Antoinette; and her younger sister, Madame Élisabeth, were all executed in 1793–94. Clotilde regarded her brother to have been a Catholic martyr, but she was reportedly more emotionally affected by the execution of her sister, which became a turning point in her life. She initially harbored good hope that Élisabeth would not be executed, because of her comparatively small political importance, and the news of her execution was therefore a shock. Her spouse told her by saying that they must make a sacrifice, upon which she understood immediately, replied, "The sacrifice is made!" and fainted. She participated in a public procession of penance to the Church of the Pere Philippins in Turin, where she announced the death of her sister and ordered prayers to be said for her, and after this spoke of her as a saint. After the execution of her sister, Clotilde declared her intention to live for the rest of her life in a state of penitence: from this year until her death, she only wore simple blue woolen dresses, cut her hair and covered it with a simple cap, discarded all her jewelry except for a ring and a cross, and stopped attending the theater and opera. It was noted that she did receive the ambassador of the French Republic, Ginguen, with kindness, which aroused surprise, but she commented that she considered it to be a Christian act.

== Queen of Sardinia ==
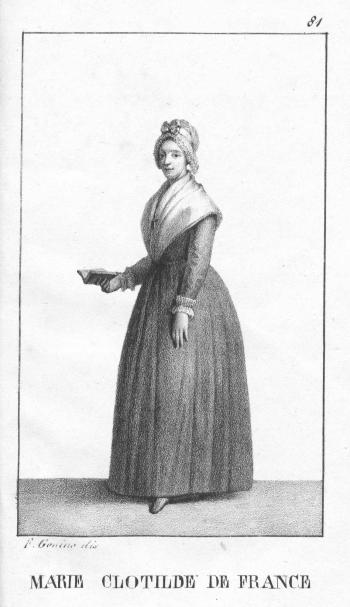
Queen Clotilde

In 1796, upon the accession of her husband to the throne, Clotilde became the Queen of Sardinia. Charles Emmanuel was described as apathetic, insecure and incapable of acting, and the stress of the grave situation of the kingdom made his nervous condition worse and made it difficult for him to rule. He preferred to have Clotilde receive the reports from ministers and diplomats, read them, summarize them for him, and advise him how to act. Clotilde followed these instructions, consulted the ministers before she made recommendations to her husband, and also made sure to await the right moment to involve him in state affairs so as not to cause him more stress or make the public aware of his nervous condition. This method of conducting the affairs of state caused disruption and delays and made the governing inefficient and slow in a very critical situation for Piedmont, and although Clotilde was careful not to appear to involve herself in politics, her great influence was too apparent not to cause criticism. The King and Queen were also accused of devoting too much time to their religious devotions, causing all the more delays for the government work. During their reign in Turin, one of the most important affairs was the confiscation of church property, which was necessary for state economy, but Clotilde insisted on a lengthy (and successful) procedure of obtaining permission and blessings from the Pope for religious reasons before proceeding.

On 6 December 1798, the French First Republic declared war on Sardinia. Charles Emmanuel was forced to abdicate all his territories on the Italian mainland and to withdraw to the island of Sardinia. The royal family was ordered to leave Turin immediately after the abdication, and as the King had a nervous attack, the departure was organized by Clotilde. Upon the wish of the Duchess of Aosta, Clotilde successfully asked General Bertrand Clausel to allow the Duke of Aosta to accompany the rest of the family rather than to stay as a French hostage. She left the crown jewels behind, but took all jewels defined as private property and accepted a sum of money from the Finance Minister after having been assured by a priest that it would be in accordance with religious principles to do so. The family departed from the royal palace during the night, escorted by 30 Italian and 30 French soldiers and a French commissionaire to the border: when the wagon was temporarily delayed on their way from Turin by protesting crowds, Charles Emmanuel commented to Clotilde that this incident of loyalty would comfort him in exile.

During their reign in exile from mainland Sardinia, the couple traveled between the Italian states as well as their own provinces and upheld diplomatic relations with the hope of being restored to Turin. They traveled from Parma, Bologna and Florence to Sardinia, where they arrived in Cagliari on 3 March 1799, welcomed with a Te Deum and settled in the Royal Palace of Cagliari, where they held a reception for the local nobility. Clotilde was not well during their stay on Sardinia, as the woolen penitential clothing she insisted on wearing was not healthy in the hot climate of Sardinia.

During their exile, Clotilde served as the spokesperson, de facto chief Councillor and first minister of Charles Emmanuel and in fact handled the Sardinian government in exile, demonstrating both diplomatic skill and a steady support for Charles Emmanuel, who refused to abdicate his office as long as she was alive, despite the demands of his brothers to do so. Despite her political activity, however, Clotilde always played down her personality, both publicly and privately, as this was considered more befitting of her pietas. On one occasion in 1801, she persuaded her husband's governor in Sardinia, the count of Genevois, not to resign.

In September 1800, Charles Emmanuel and Clotilde left Sardinia for Florence because the Russo-Austrian alliance in the war against France raised their hopes of being restored to Turin, but the Battle of Marengo made them flee for Rome and then to Naples, where they stayed November 1800-March 1801 before returning to Rome. In Rome they lived as guests of the wealthy Colonna family. Clotilde nursed her husband's aunt Princess Maria Felicita of Savoy through her last illness in Naples in 1801. She also attended her favorite lady-in-waiting Badia, and during which she was mistaken for a servant woman by the doctor and performed his orders without protests and without telling him who she was or reproaching him when he found out and apologized, an incident which aroused some attention. The couple finally returned to Naples in May 1801. Except for attending to political affairs via correspondence, Clotilde devoted herself to visiting religious places, churches and people.

Clotilde died on 7 March 1802. Charles Emmanuel was so moved by her death that he abdicated on 4 June 1802 in favour of his younger brother, Victor Emmanuel I. Queen Clotilde was buried in Santa Caterina a Chiaia in Naples.

== Beatification process ==
Clotilde's beatification process was opened on 10 April 1808, granting her the title of Servant of God. She was later declared venerable.

== Ancestry ==
Ancestors of Clotilde of France

8. Louis, Duke of Burgundy
4. Louis XV of France
9. Marie Adélaïde of Savoy
2. Louis, Dauphin of France
10. Stanisław I Leszczyński
5. Marie Leszczyńska
11. Katarzyna Opalińska
1. Clotilde of France
12. Augustus II of Poland
6. Augustus III of Poland
13. Christiane Eberhardine of Bayreuth
3. Maria Josepha of Saxony
14. Joseph I, Holy Roman Emperor
7. Maria Josepha of Austria
15. Wilhelmine Amalia of Brunswick

Clotilde of France House of Bourbon Cadet branch of the Capetian dynasty Born: 23 September 1759 Died: 7 March 1802
Italian royalty
Vacant Title last held by Maria Antonia Ferdinanda of Spain	Queen consort of Sardinia; 16 October 1796 – 7 March 1802	Vacant Title next held by Maria Theresa of Austria-Este
