= Jean-Martial Frédou =

French painter

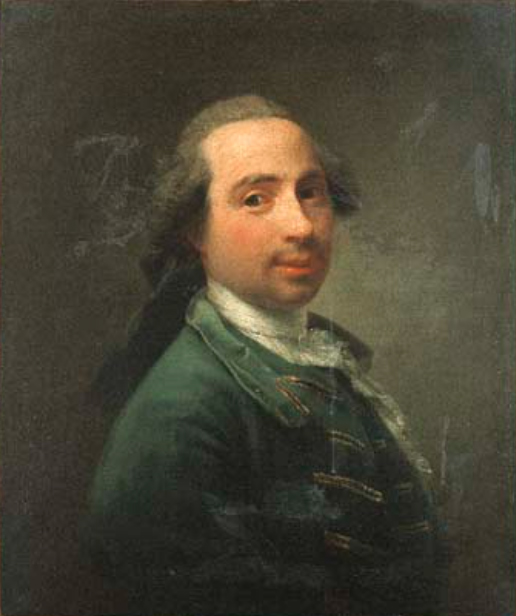
Self-portrait (presumed)

Jean-Martial Frédou (28 January 1710, Fontenay-Saint-Père – 26 February 1795, Versailles) was a French painter known for his portraits.

Born at Fontenay-Saint-Père, Frédou was attached to the Cabinet du Roi housed in the Hôtel de la Surintendance at Versailles, where he was commissioned to render duplicates of official portraits of the French royal family painted by Jean-Marc Nattier, Maurice Quentin de La Tour, Louis-Michel Van Loo, Alexander Roslin or Joseph Siffred Duplessis.

In his own commissions he often borrowed elements from the original works of these painters, for he was a deft portraitist himself. Between 1760 and 1762 the dauphine Marie-Josèphe de Saxe, daughter-in-law of Louis XV commissioned informal portraits of herself and her children, for her own use. These portraits, whether in oil or drawn aux trois crayons, touched with pastels, have freshness and life.

A modest commission came from the Dauphin and Dauphine in 1757: in 1748 they had earth brought into the little courtyard of their private apartments at the château de Versailles, closed in with trelliswork, to make a little garden; and Frédou was commissioned to paint two perspective panels to enlarge the little space.

Frédou was never made a member of the Académie Royale de Peinture et de Sculpture, but he was made First Painter to the comte de Provence in 1776 upon the death of François-Hubert Drouais.
