= Michel de Marillac =

French jurist and counsellor

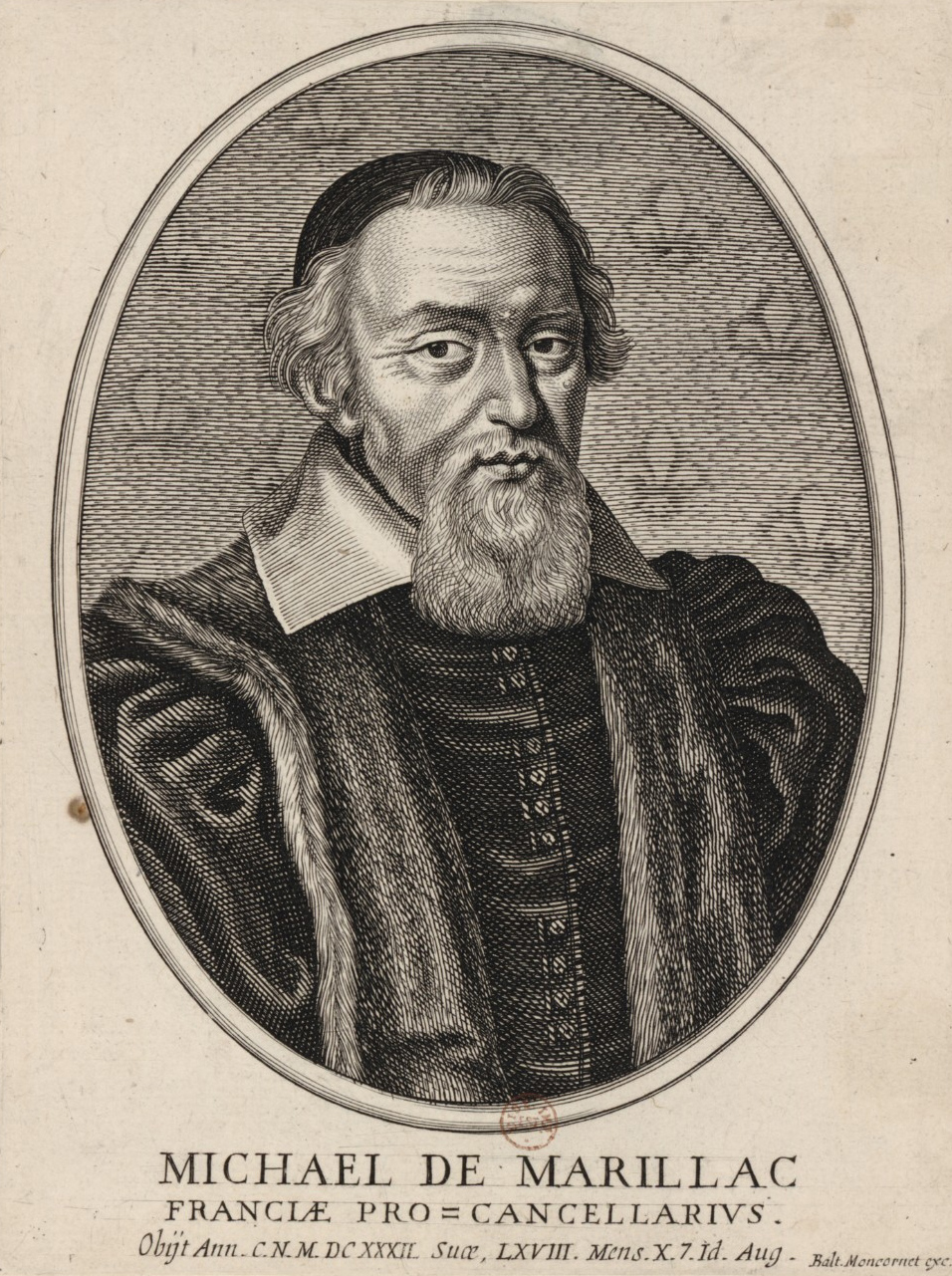
Michel de Marillac

Michel de Marillac (October 1563 in Paris – 7 August 1632 in Château de Châteaudun) was a French jurist and counsellor at the court of Louis XIII, one of the leading dévots. His uncle was Charles de Marillac, Archbishop of Vienne and a member of the king's council, the Conseil du Roi. A member of the circle of Marie de' Medici, he was arrested after the Queen Mother's flight in 1631 and died in prison.

Michel de Marillac was Minister of Justice in 1626. He was appointed Superintendent of Finances on 27 August 1624, with Jean Bochart. His advice to Cardinal Richelieu advocated conservative policies abroad and limited involvement in northern Italy during the War of the Mantuan Succession, while France was occupied with suppressing Huguenots at home and countering Habsburg influence in the drawn-out Bourbon-Habsburg wars that were not resolved until 1659. His main concern was encouraging economic growth, as a balance to the threats posed by popular unrest in France and the resistance to new forms of taxation to support the war. His key proposals reforming the legal administration were embodied in the Code Michau, published in 1629, which synthesised in 430 article headings texts adopted by the États-général of 1614 and the Assemblies of Notables, 1617–26, embracing every aspect of government.

Marillac was entrusted with the position of Keeper of the Seals (garde des sceaux, a Chancellor without the title), after Chancellor d'Aligre was disgraced, in June 1626, compromised by his fidelity to Gaston d'Orléans.

He gained increasing influence with Marie de' Medici. After the Day of the Dupes, 11 November 1630, Richelieu had Marillac tried by a court of hand-picked judges; he died in captivity in 1632. Marillac's brother Louis, who had served as a general of the French army in Italy during the War of the Mantuan Succession, was beheaded that same year.

Michel was the guardian of Louis' natural daughter Louise de Marillac, who became a nun, was a follower of Saint Vincent de Paul, with whom she founded the Daughters of Charity on 29 November 1633.
