= Xavier, Duke of Aquitaine =

French prince who died in infancy (1753–54)

Xavier
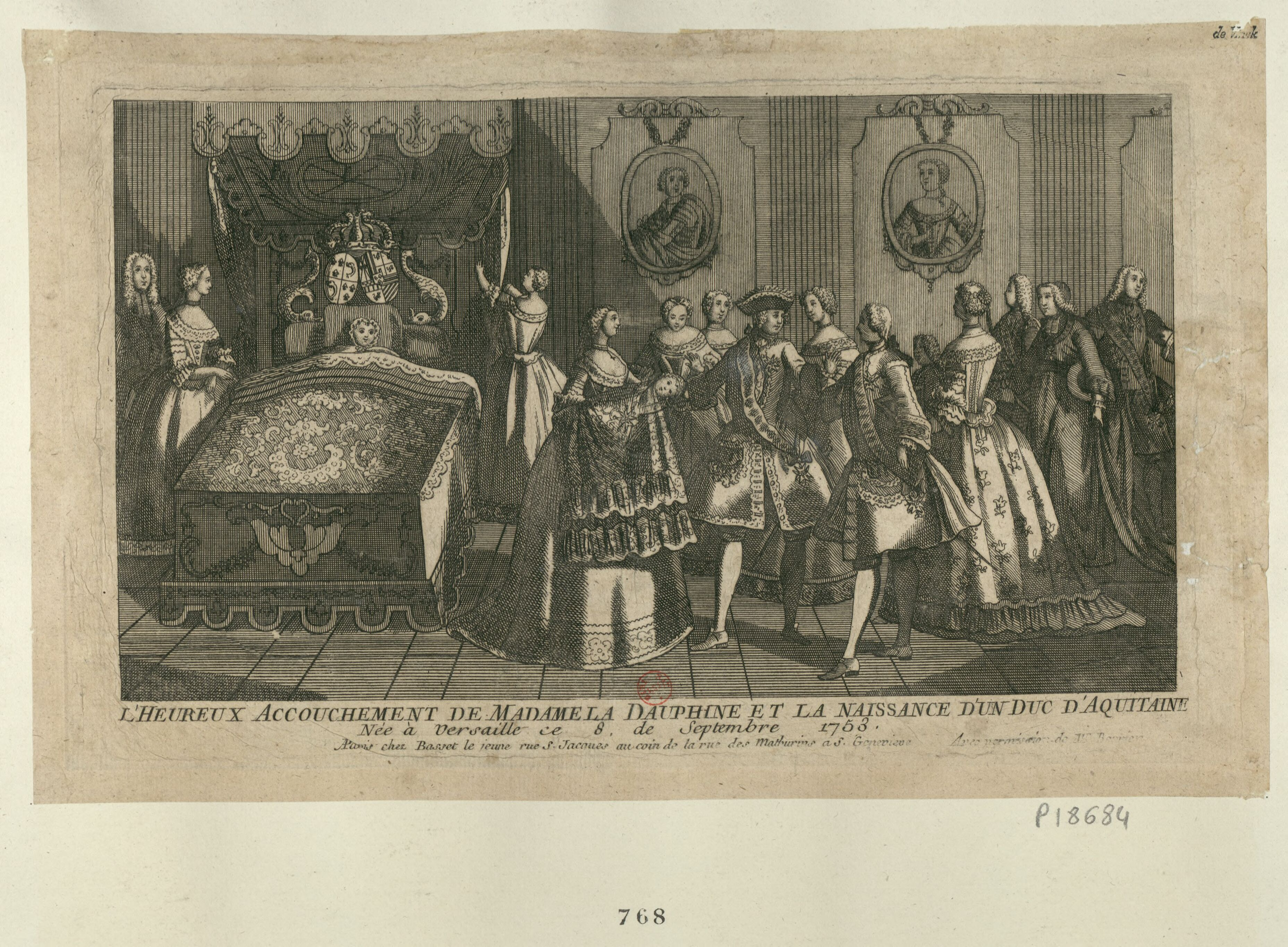
- Birth of Prince Xavier in 1753, Bibliothèque nationale de France
- Born: 8 September 1753; Palace of Versailles, Versailles, France
- Died: 22 February 1754 (aged 5 1/2 months); Palace of Versailles, Versailles, France
- Burial: Saint Denis Basilica
- House: Bourbon
- Father: Louis, Dauphin of France
- Mother: Princess Maria Josepha of Saxony

Xavier Marie Joseph, Duke of Aquitaine (8 September 1753 – 22 February 1754) was a French prince of the House of Bourbon. He was the third surviving child and second eldest son of Louis, Dauphin of France and Maria Josepha of Saxony, and was thus the second oldest brother to the future kings Louis XVI, Louis XVIII and Charles X. He was given the courtesy title of Duke of Aquitaine upon birth and during the five months he lived he was third in line to the throne of France after his father and his elder brother Louis Joseph, Duke of Burgundy. He died after an epileptic seizure on 22 February 1754 and was buried in the Saint Denis Basilica. Since he and his brother predeceased their father and grandfather, the throne of France ultimately passed to their younger brother Louis Auguste (as Louis XVI).

== Ancestors ==
Ancestors of Xavier, Duke of Aquitaine

8. Louis, Duke of Burgundy
4. Louis XV of France
9. Marie Adélaïde of Savoy
2. Louis, Dauphin of France
10. Stanisław I Leszczyński
5. Marie Leszczyńska
11. Katarzyna Opalińska
1. Xavier, Duke of Aquitaine
12. Augustus II of Poland
6. Augustus III of Poland
13. Christiane Eberhardine of Bayreuth
3. Maria Josepha of Saxony
14. Joseph I, Holy Roman Emperor
7. Maria Josepha of Austria
15. Wilhelmine Amalia of Brunswick

Xavier, Duke of Aquitaine House of Bourbon Born: 8 September 1753 Died: 22 February 1754
French royalty
Preceded by Charles of Valois, Duke of Berry	Duke of Aquitaine; 1753–1754	Succeeded by Gonzalo, Duke of Aquitaine
