= Maria Josepha of Saxony, Dauphine of France =

Dauphine of France (1731–1767)

Maria Josepha of Saxony
- Dauphine of France
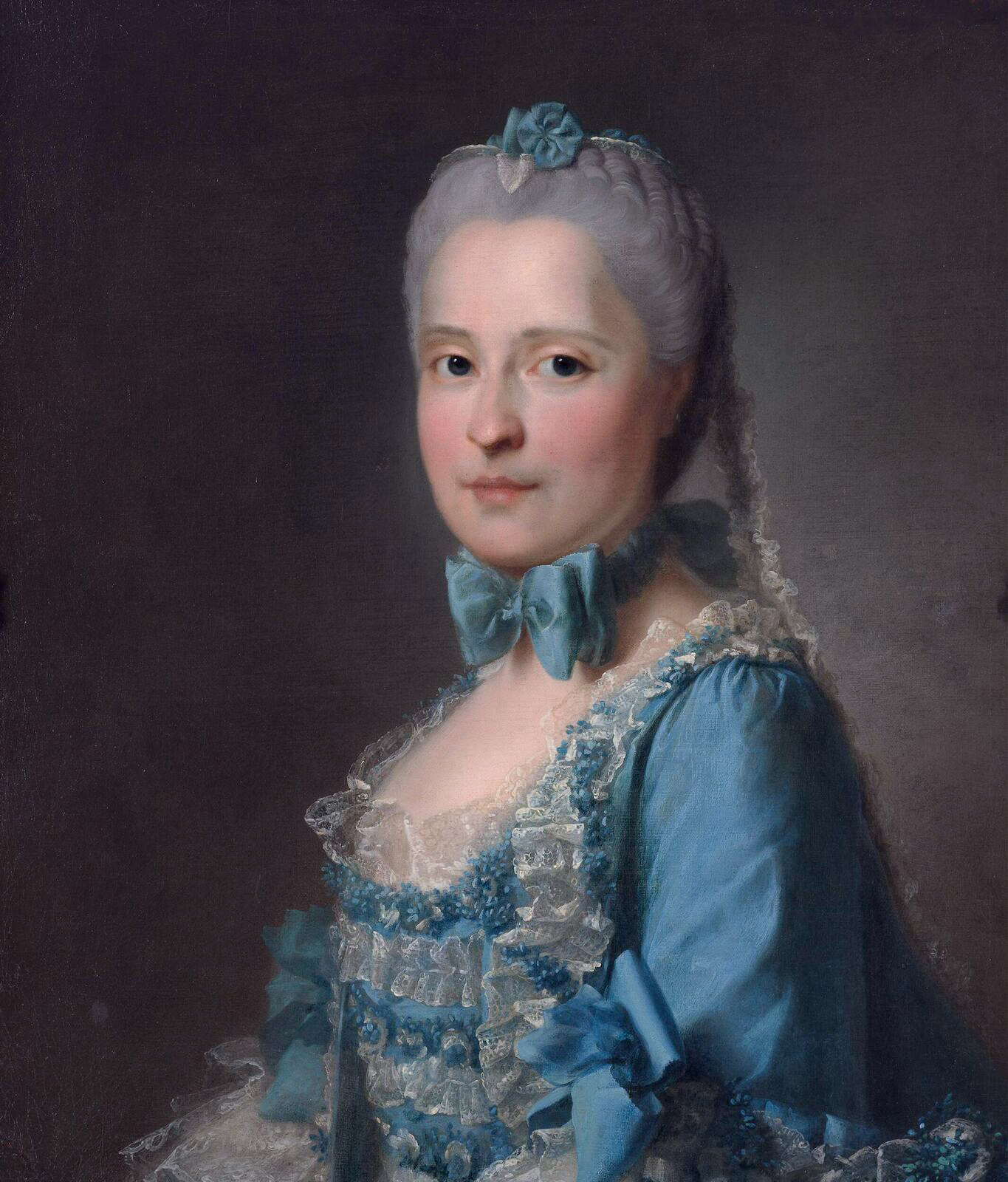
- Portrait by Jean-Martial Frédou, 1760
- Born: 4 November 1731; Dresden Castle, Dresden, Saxony
- Died: 13 March 1767 (aged 35); Palace of Versailles, France
- Burial: 22 March 1767; Cathedral of Saint-Étienne in Sens, France
- Spouse: Louis, Dauphin of France (m. 1747; died 1765)
- Issue Detail: Marie Zéphyrine; Louis Joseph, Duke of Burgundy; Xavier, Duke of Aquitaine; Louis XVI; Louis XVIII; Charles X; Clotilde, Queen of Sardinia; Élisabeth
Names
- French: Marie Josèphe Caroline Eléonore Françoise Xavière; German: Maria Josepha Karolina Eleonore Franziska Xaveria
- House: Wettin
- Father: Augustus III of Poland
- Mother: Maria Josepha of Austria

Maria Josepha of Saxony (Maria Josepha Karolina Eleonore Franziska Xaveria; 4 November 1731 – 13 March 1767) was Dauphine of France through her marriage to Louis, the son and heir of Louis XV. She was the mother of three kings of France, Louis XVI, Louis XVIII, and Charles X, as well as the Queen of Sardinia and Madame Élisabeth.

== Childhood ==
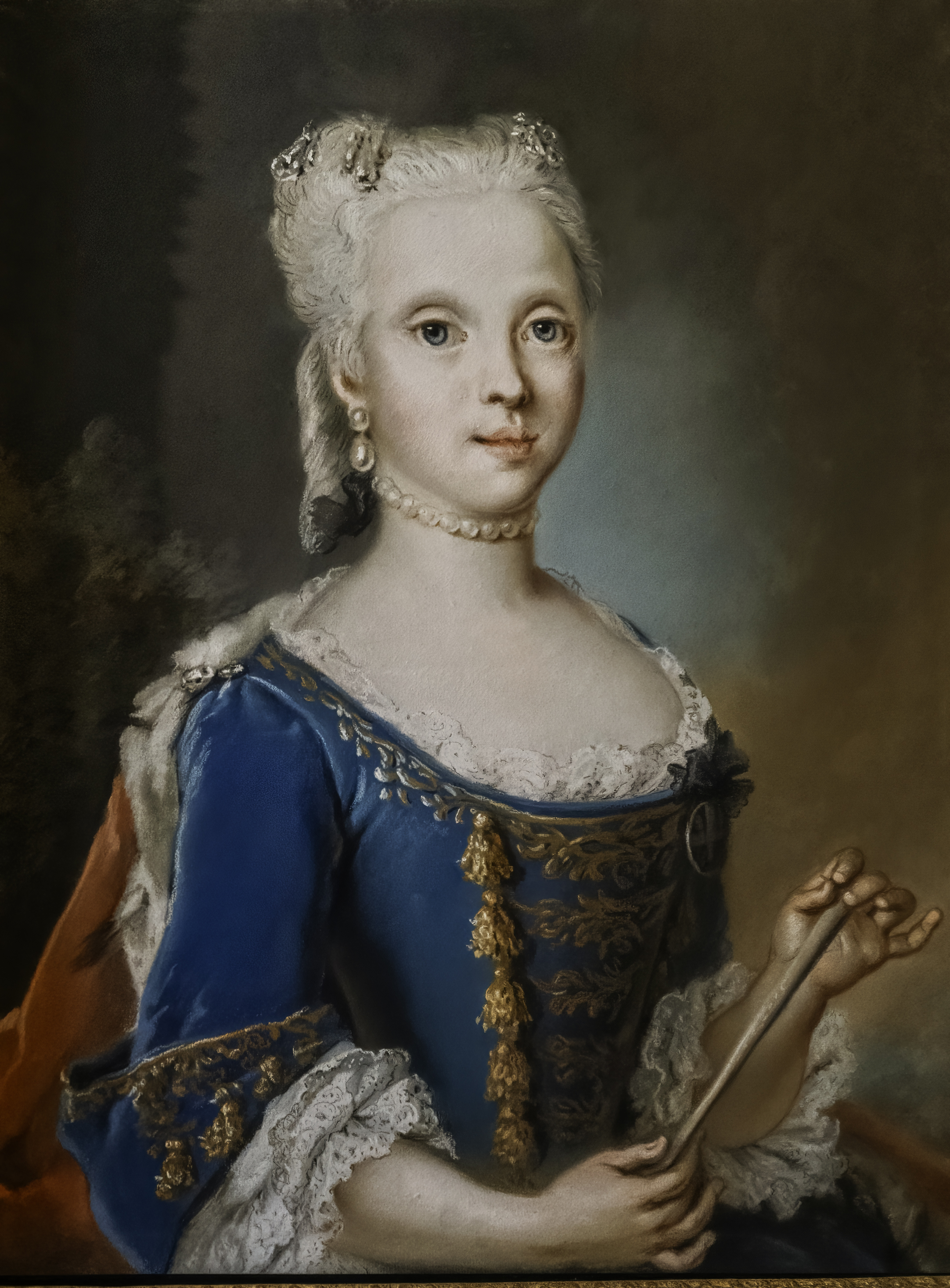
Maria Josepha by Marie-Catherine Silvestre

Maria Josepha was born on 4 November 1731 in Dresden Castle to Augustus III, Prince-Elector of Saxony, King of Poland and Grand Duke of Lithuania and Maria Josepha of Austria. Maria Josepha was the ninth of sixteen children born to the couple, and their fifth daughter.

Louis, Dauphin of France, eldest son of King Louis XV, was widowed in 1746 when his wife, Maria Teresa Rafaela of Spain, died while giving birth to their only child, a daughter named after herself. Maria Teresa's mother offered the Dauphin another sister, Maria Antonia Ferdinanda. Instead, the King of France and his mistress Madame de Pompadour wished to open up diplomatic channels.

The marriage between Maria Josepha and the Dauphin had first been suggested by her uncle Maurice de Saxe. Louis XV and his mistress were convinced that the marriage would be advantageous to French foreign affairs; France and Saxony had been on opposing sides in the recent War of the Austrian Succession and thus the marriage between the Saxon princess and the Dauphin would form a new alliance between the two nations. There was one problem with the suggested bride: Maria Josepha's father Augustus III of Poland had deposed Stanislaus I Leszczyński from the Polish throne. Leszczyński was the father of Maria Leszczyńska, Louis XV's wife and mother of the Dauphin. The marriage was said to have humiliated the simple-living Queen, even though she and Maria Josepha would have a good relationship later on.

Other proposals came from Savoy in the form of Princess Eleonora or her sister Princess Maria Luisa. Both were refused. Despite the disapproval of the Queen, Maria Josepha and the Dauphin were married on 9 February 1747.

== Dauphine ==
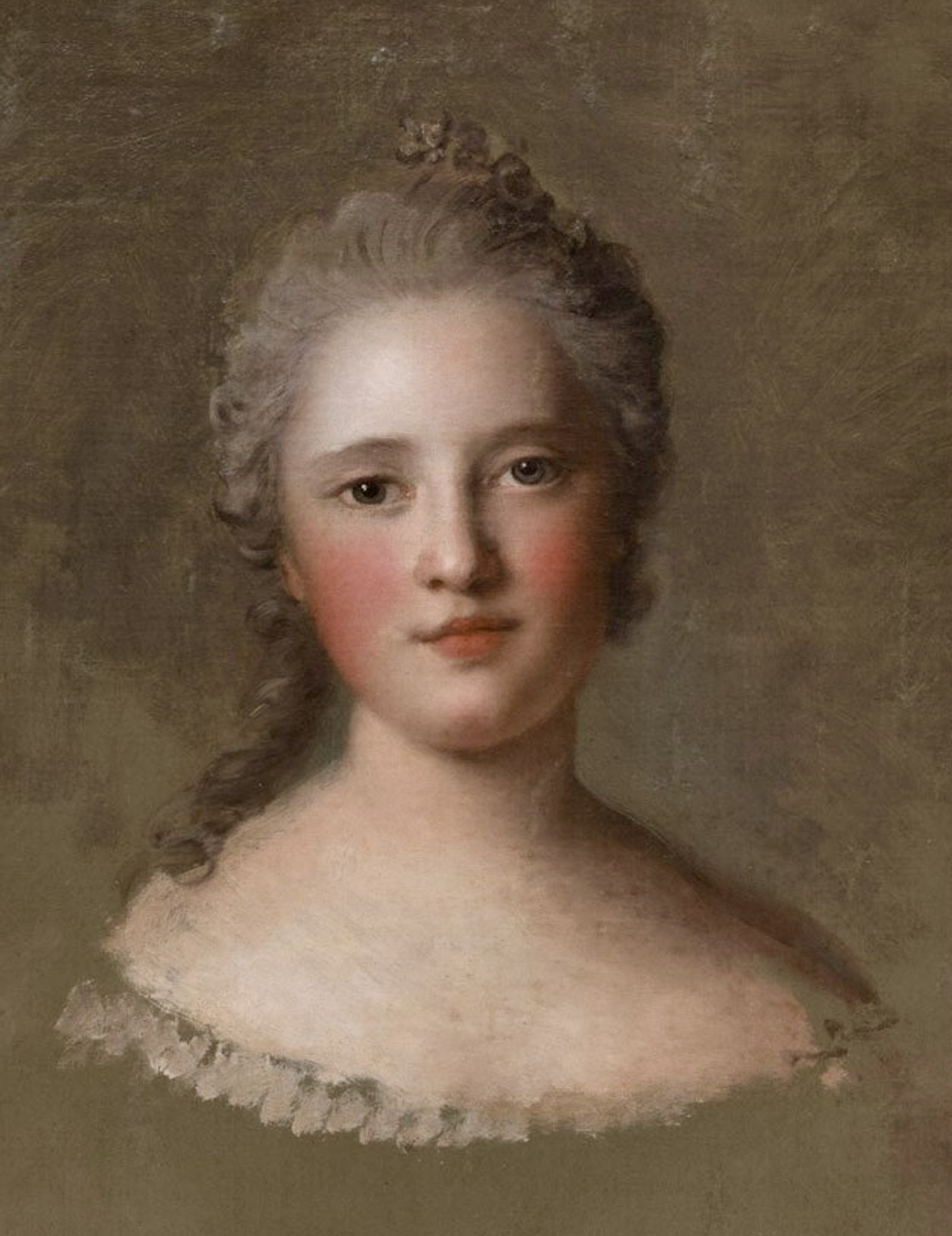
Portrait by Jean Marc Nattier, 1750

Prior to the marriage, tradition demanded that the bride wear a bracelet which had an image of her father on it; the Queen, seeing the Dauphine, asked to see the bracelet. The clever Maria Josepha then revealed the bracelet to the Queen, which showed a portrait of the Queen's father. The Dauphine said that the portrait represented the fact that the Duke of Lorraine was Maria Josepha's grandfather by marriage. The Queen and the court were strongly impressed by this. The Dauphine also became very close to her father-in-law Louis XV.

At the time of the marriage, the Dauphin was still grieving for his Spanish wife. This grief was very public on the part of the Dauphin but Maria Josepha was praised greatly for conquering the heart of the Dauphin "bit by bit". Despite Maria Josepha being the patient wife, the Dauphin's grief worsened in April 1748 when his only child with his late wife died at the age of two. The Dauphin was deeply affected by the child's death. Maria Josepha later commissioned a now lost portrait of her stepdaughter to be left over her cradle.

The new Dauphine showed much gratitude to Madame de Pompadour for helping arrange her marriage, and maintained a friendly relationship with the royal mistress.

Like the Dauphin, Maria Josepha was very devout. Together with her mother-in-law and husband, she formed a counterbalance to the libertine behaviour of her father-in-law and his court. The couple were not fond of the various entertainments held at Versailles every week, preferring to stay in their apartments which can still be seen on the ground floor of Versailles overlooking the Orangerie.

The couple's first child was a daughter, born in 1750 on the feast day of Saint Zephyrinus and named Marie Zéphyrine. The birth was greeted with much joy by her parents, even though Louis XV had been disappointed the child was not a male. She died in 1755. Their second child, Louis, was born on 13 September 1751. The Dauphine was a devoted and loving mother, but favored her eldest son at the expense of her other children. He died on 22 March 1761 of extrapulmonary tuberculosis. The couple's second son, Xavier, was born in 1753, and died in infancy. As a result, their third son, Louis-Auguste, born on 23 August 1754, became second in line to the French throne after his father.

Thanks to Maria Josepha's close relationship with the King and the Dauphin, the relationship between father and son was soon repaired. The Dauphin was at the center of the Dévots, a group of religious-minded men who hoped to gain power when he succeeded to the throne. They were against the way Louis XV openly had affairs at court in blatant view of the Queen. Naturally, they were not popular with Louis XV.

Her father-in-law named his loving daughter-in-law la triste Pepa; in 1756, Frederick II of Prussia invaded her native Saxony and began the Seven Years' War, which France later joined. Politically reserved, she exerted herself only once, in 1762, in vain, for the preservation of the Society of Jesus in France. The Society had been dissolved by order of the Parlement of Paris, inspired by Jansenist magistrates, against the will of the King.

== Later life ==
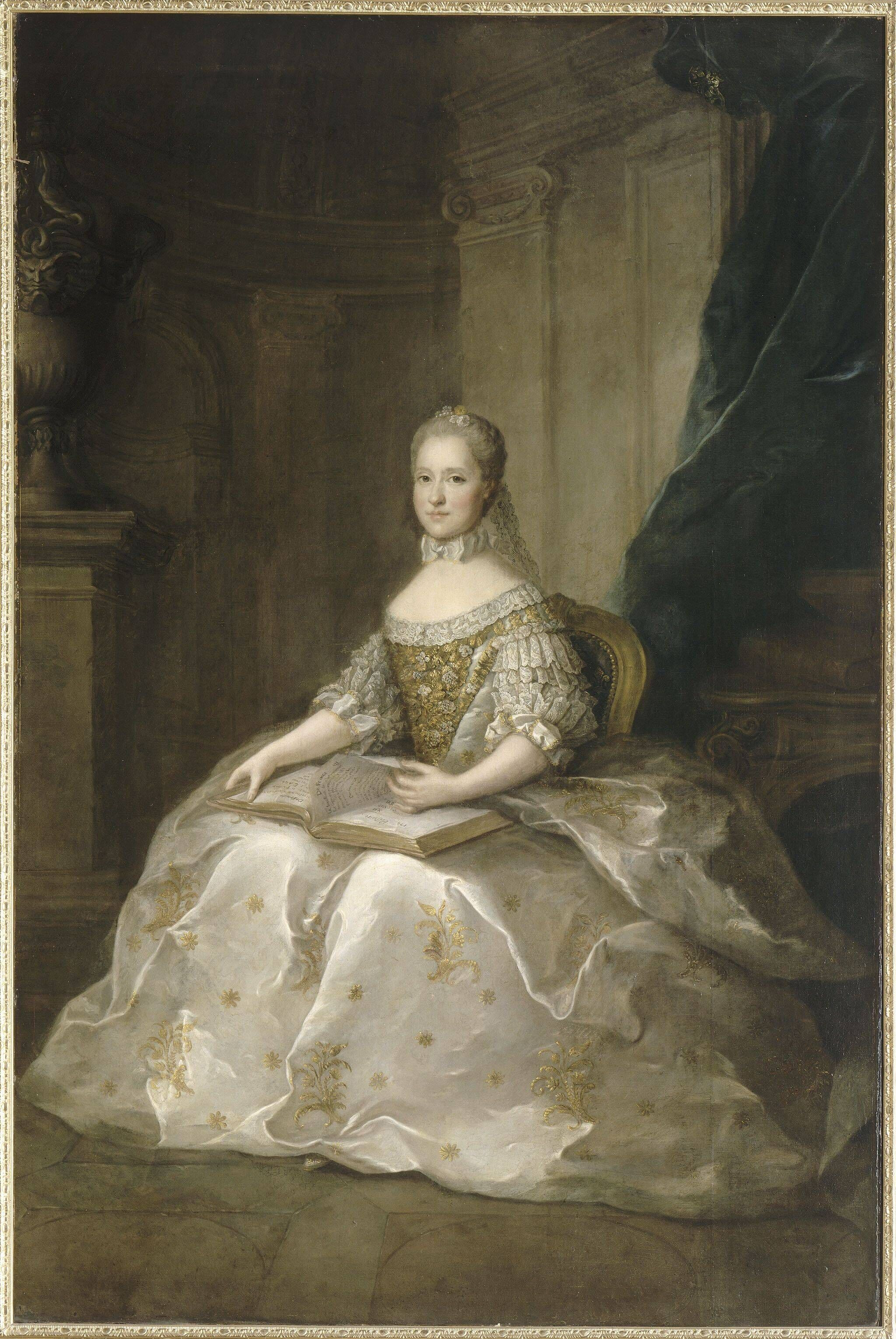
Maria Josepha in 1764 (portrait by Anne Baptiste Nivelon; after Maurice Quentin de La Tour)

The death of her husband in December 1765 dealt Maria Josepha a devastating blow from which she never recovered, sinking into a deep depression which lasted till her own death 15 months later.

Henriette Campan described the state of Maria Josepha during her widowhood:

"The Dauphiness, his widow, was deeply afflicted; but the immoderate despair which characterised her grief induced many to suspect that the loss of the crown was an important part of the calamity she lamented. She long refused to eat enough to support life; she encouraged her tears to flow by placing portraits of the Dauphin in every retired part of her apartments. She had him represented pale, and ready to expire, in a picture placed at the foot of her bed, under draperies of gray cloth, with which the chambers of the Princesses were always hung in court mournings. Their grand cabinet was hung with black cloth, with an alcove, a canopy, and a throne, on which they received compliments of condolence after the first period of the deep mourning. The Dauphiness, some months before the end of her career, regretted her conduct in abridging it; but it was too late; the fatal blow had been struck. It may also be presumed that living with a consumptive man had contributed to her complaint. This Princess had no opportunity of displaying her qualities; living in a Court in which she was eclipsed by the King and Queen, the only characteristics that could be remarked in her were her extreme attachment to her husband, and her great piety."

In order the ease the grief of the Dauphine, Louis XV re-arranged the allocation of apartments within Versailles, so that Maria Josepha moved out of the apartments that she had shared with her husband and into the apartments of Madame de Pompadour, who had died in 1764. There, the king visited her more than he had in the past, paid her many kind attentions, and discussed with her a possible bride for her son, the new dauphin. Maria Josepha was not pleased with the idea of her eldest son marrying a daughter of Empress Maria Theresa, in whose favour Maria Josepha's own mother (a cousin of Maria Theresa) had been disinherited.

Maria Josepha's health declined. She died on 13 March 1767 of tuberculosis, and was buried in the Cathedral of Saint-Étienne in Sens. The marriage of her son, the future Louis XVI, with Maria Theresa's daughter Marie Antoinette was celebrated three years later.

== Issue ==
- Miscarriage or false pregnancy* (15 March 1748)
- Miscarriage or false pregnancy* (30 January 1748)
- Miscarriage* (10 May 1749)
- Marie Zéphyrine (26 August 1750 – 1 September 1755); died in childhood.
- Louis Joseph of France, Duke of Burgundy (13 September 1751 – 22 March 1761); died in childhood.
- Miscarried or Stillborn daughter* (9 March 1752)
- Xavier of France, Duke of Aquitaine (8 September 1753 – 22 February 1754); died in infancy.
- Louis XVI (23 August 1754 – 21 January 1793); married Archduchess Maria Antonia of Austria and had issue.
- Louis XVIII (17 November 1755 – 16 September 1824); married Princess Maria Giuseppina of Savoy, had two miscarried children.
- Miscarriage or false pregnancy* (25 October 1756)
- Charles X of France (9 October 1757 – 6 November 1836); married Maria Theresa of Savoy and had issue.
- Clotilde, Queen of Sardinia (23 September 1759 – 7 March 1802); married Charles Emmanuel IV of Sardinia, no issue.
- Miscarriage, stillbirth, or false pregnancy* (1762)
- Élisabeth (3 May 1764 – 10 May 1794); died unmarried.

== Ancestry ==
Ancestors of Maria Josepha of Saxony, Dauphine of France

8. John George III, Elector of Saxony
4. Augustus II of Poland
9. Anna Sophie of Denmark
2. Augustus III of Poland
10. Christian Ernst, Margrave of Brandenburg-Bayreuth
5. Christiane Eberhardine of Brandenburg-Bayreuth
11. Sophie Louise of Württemberg
1. Maria Josepha of Saxony
12. Leopold I, Holy Roman Emperor
6. Joseph I, Holy Roman Emperor
13. Eleonore Magdalene of Neuburg
3. Maria Josepha of Austria
14. John Frederick, Duke of Brunswick-Lüneburg
7. Wilhelmina Amalia of Brunswick
15. Benedicta Henrietta of the Palatinate

== Sources ==
- Algrant, Christine Pevitt (2002). Madame de Pompadour: Mistress of France. New York: Grove Press. ISBN 978-0802140357.
- Bernier, Olivier (1984). Louis the Beloved: the Life of Louis XV. New York: Doubleday. ISBN 978-0385184021.
- Broglie, Emmanuel de (1877). Le fils de Louis XV, Louis, dauphin de France, 1729-1765. E. Plon.
- Cronin, Vincent (1975). Louis and Antoinette. New York: William Morrow & Company, Inc. ISBN 978-0-688-00331-9.
- Faÿ, Bernard (1968). Louis XVI or The End of a World. Translated by Patrick O'Brian. Chicago: Henry Regnery Company. ISBN 978-0-491-00040-6.
- Mitford, Nancy (1976). Madame de Pompadour. London: Sphere Books. ISBN 978-0-7221-6141-8.
