= Dévots =

French 17th century group

Dévots (French pronunciation: [devo], Devout) was the name given in France to a group, active in both politics and social welfare, in the first half of the 17th century, which took a decisive part in the Catholic reform. It represented a perspective rather than a party. They shared a resistance to Protestant ascendancy, a nostalgia for the lost unity of Christendom, and an interest in social reforms in accordance with Christian morality.

== History ==
The "Dévots" were members of a conservative faction in France in the early part of the seventeenth century with a strong political purpose. Among the prominent dévots was Cardinal Pierre de Bérulle, founder of the French school of spirituality and chaplain to queen Marie de' Medici. A number of members had earlier belonged to the Catholic League. According to historian Mack P. Holt, "...the League was the conduit between the Tridentine spirituality of the Catholic Reformation and the seventeenth century devots." However, Catholic royalists were also equally involved in dévot social projects.

Bérulle and the devots favored an alliance of France with Catholic Austria and Spain, and opposed Cardinal Richelieu who wanted to undermine Habsburg influence in Europe. Although the Day of the Dupes (November 10, 1630), which confirmed Richelieu as prime minister, marked their political failure, the dévots nonetheless remained very influential (notably with the fervently Catholic regent Anne of Austria).

The residence of Madame Barbara Acarie, whose husband Pierre had been a strong supporter of the League, became a gathering place for the distinguished and devout of Paris. Among those who frequented her home were Keeper of the Seals Michel de Marillac, royal confessor Pierre Coton, and the Marquise de Maignelay (née Claude-Marguerite de Gondi, sister of Jean-François de Gondi, archbishop of Paris), among others. The Marquise was instrumental in the establishment of the Madelonnettes Convent, a refuge for prostitutes.

Their influence was felt through the Society of the Holy Sacrament (Compagnie du Saint-Sacrement). Molière's Tartuffe was banned in 1664 when the dévots believed it was satirizing them for being hypocritical in their faith.

Though Louis XIV established an absolute monarchy, the dévots remained active almost until the French Revolution, being very influential with two heirs to the French throne, Louis, duc de Bourgogne, grandson of Louis XIV, and Louis, Dauphin of France, son of Louis XV, both of whom died early and never reigned.

== Sources ==
- Agnès Ravel: Le « parti dévot » à la cour de France sous Louis XIV, Louis XV et Louis XVI, 2010
