= Santa Caterina a Chiaia =

Church in Naples, Italy

Coordinates: 40°50′06″N 14°14′31″E

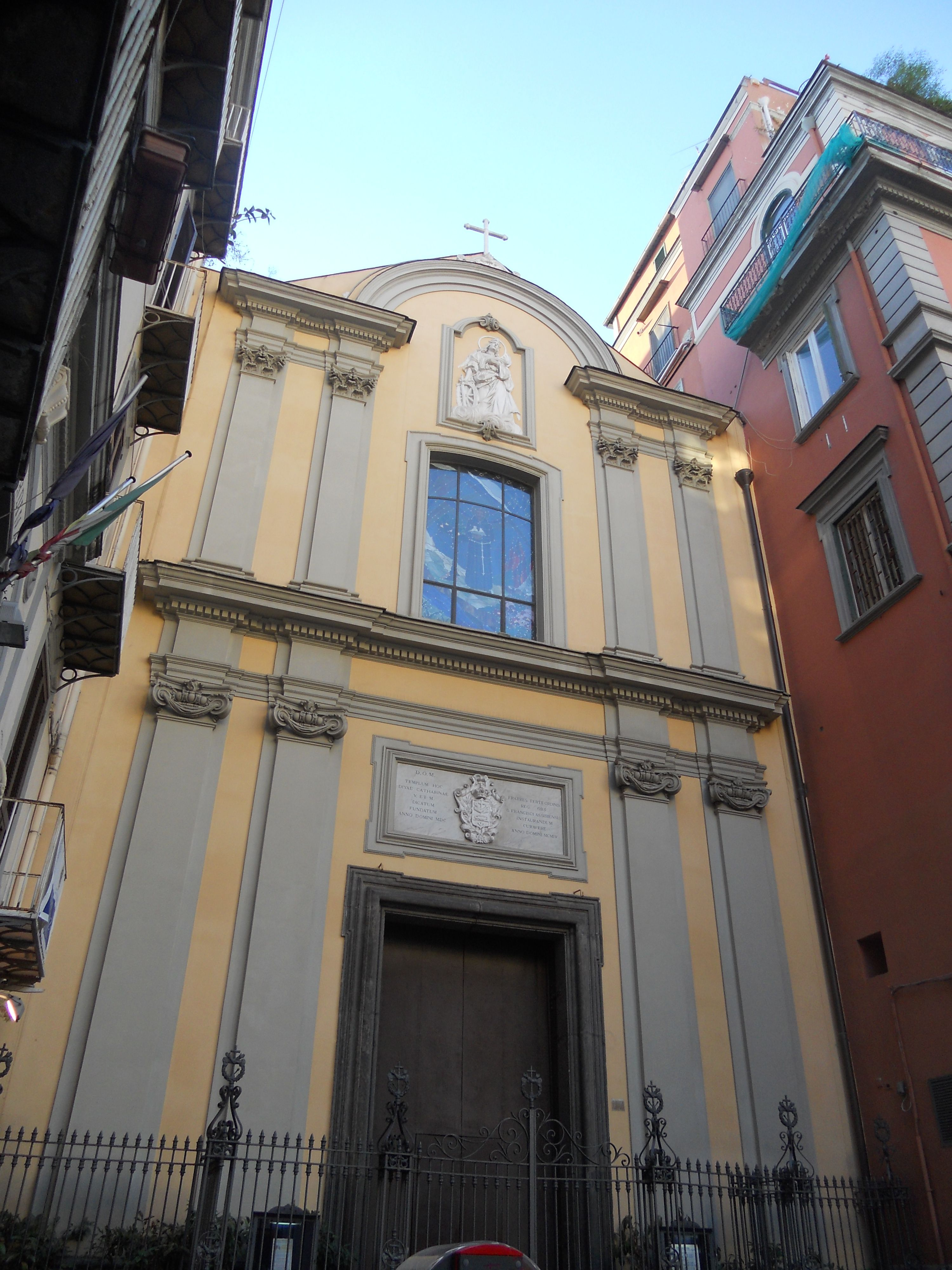
The church of Santa Caterina a Chiaia in Naples.

Santa Caterina a Chiaia (also known as Santa Caterina martire) is a Roman Catholic church located on via Santa Caterina 76 in Naples, Italy. It is located near Piazza dei Martiri in the Chiaia section of the city, near where Via Santa Caterina flows toward the tree-shaded Via Chiaia.

== History ==
The church was built originally as a small family chapel, called "S. Caterenella", by the Forti family and then ceded to the Franciscan order, which expanded it by 1600, thanks to donations, especially from the Gonzagas. The present church, however, is the result of a series of reconstructions, including a Baroque style as late as 1732 in the wake of a serious earthquake in that year.

== Architecture ==
The tall facade is characterized by a representation of the Martyrdom of Saint Catherine of Alexandria. The main entrance is marked by a plaque commemorating a restoration of the facade in 1904.

The church is in the shape of a Latin cross, with side chapels. In the center the dome built in 1601, which rests on four round arches developed on four pillars which delimit the center of the church. At the base of it there are eight bright windows from which the light rains into the inside.

Art work in the interior is mostly dedicated to the life of Saint Catherine, including a prominent dome fresco (1916) by Gustavo Girosi.
