= Louis, Duke of Burgundy (born 1751) =

French prince (1751–1761)

Louis Joseph Xavier
- Duke of Burgundy
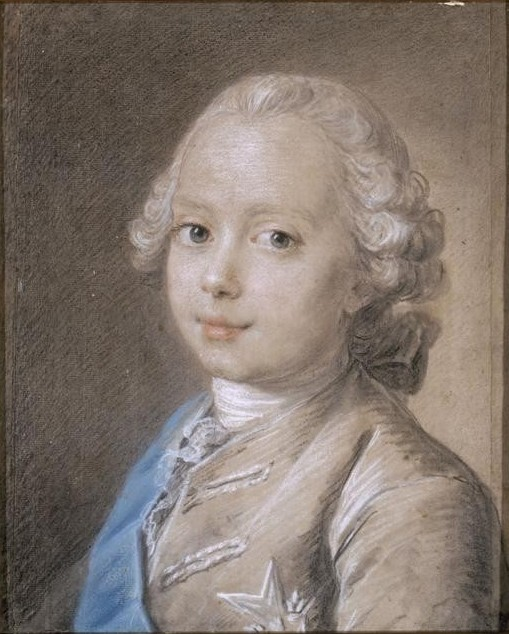
- Born: 13 September 1751; Palace of Versailles, Kingdom of France
- Died: 22 March 1761 (aged 9); Palace of Versailles, Kingdom of France
- Burial: Basilica of Saint-Denis
- House: Bourbon
- Father: Louis, Dauphin of France
- Mother: Duchess Maria Josepha of Saxony

Louis Joseph Xavier, Duke of Burgundy (13 September 1751 – 22 March 1761), was a French prince of the House of Bourbon, and as such was second-in-line to the throne of France, ranking behind his father, the Dauphin Louis, himself the son of Louis XV and his popular Queen, Marie Leszczyńska. Although Louis was his parents' first son to be born alive, he died of extra-pulmonary tuberculosis at the young age of nine. As a result of his untimely death, all three of his younger brothers - Louis Auguste, Louis Stanislas, and Charles Philippe - became kings of France.

== Early life ==
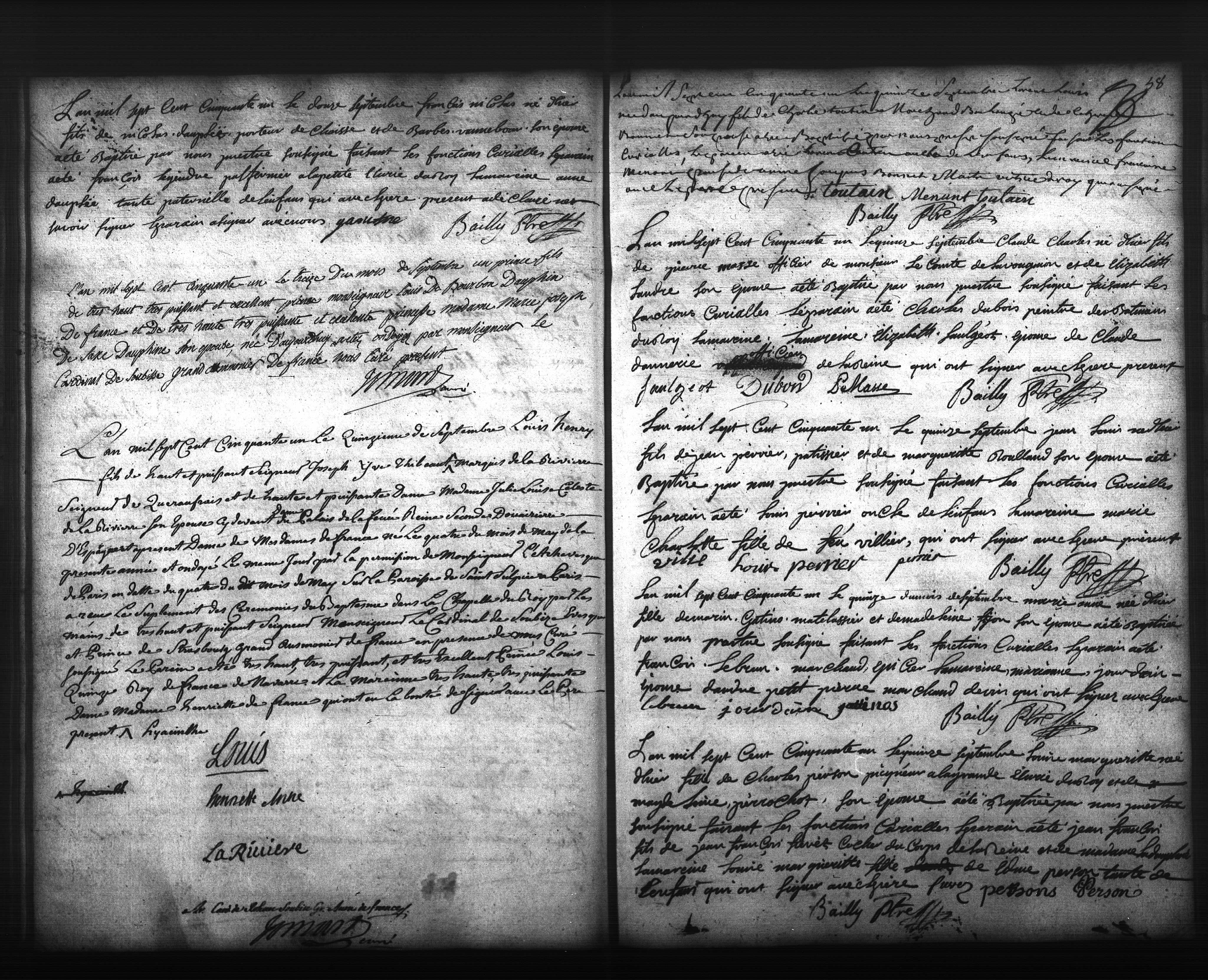
Baptismal registry of Louis Joseph at the parish of Notre-Dame

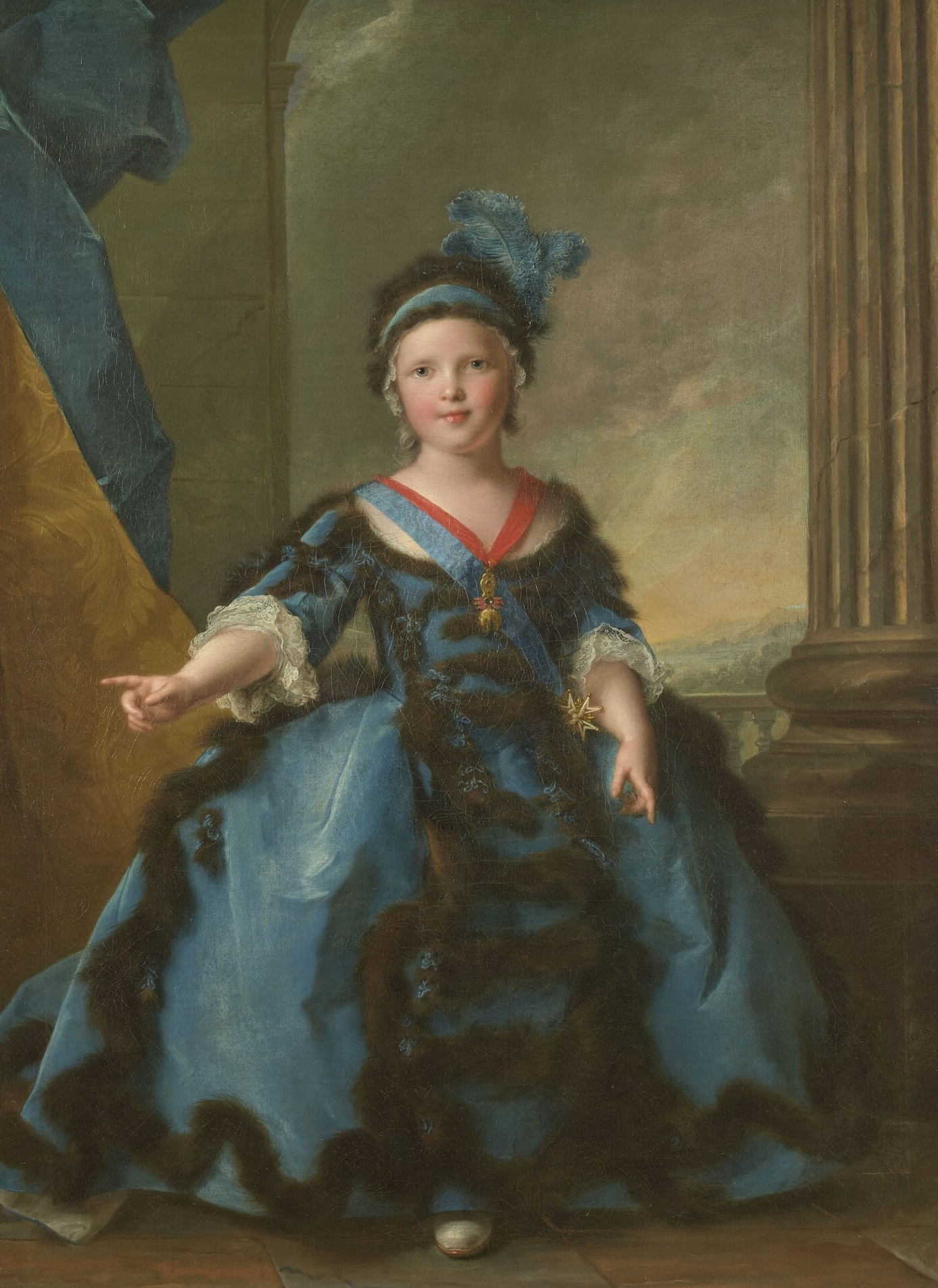
Louis Joseph in 1754, by Jean-Marc Nattier

Louis Joseph Xavier, styled duke of Burgundy from birth, was born at the Palace of Versailles on September 13 1751. He was the second surviving child and eldest son of Louis, Dauphin of France and Maria Josepha of Saxony, and was thus the oldest brother to the future kings Louis XVI, Louis XVIII and Charles X. A Te Deum was performed in Notre-Dame to celebrate his birth.

Regarded as the most capable of his brothers, the Duke was the favorite child of his parents. He was said to be handsome and bright.

Like his siblings, he was cared for by Madame de Marsan, the Governess of the Children of France. Later, the Duke of Vauguyon was named his governor. He was much loved by those who were close to him, especially his older sister Marie Zéphyrine, who died at the age of five in 1755. It is unknown if the Duke, who was not even four years old yet, was affected by this.

== Death ==
Around 1760, the young Duke developed a limp and it was presumed that he fell, but he refused to reveal how. He later confessed that he was pushed by one of his playmates but did not tell anyone to prevent his friend from getting into any trouble. After the incident, an abscess emerged and the Duke's health began to deteriorate quickly. He underwent painful surgery but his condition did not improve.

Knowing that he would die, the Dauphin had him baptised on 29 November 1760 as Louis Xavier Charles Prince of France, with Louis XV and Marie Leszczyńska, his grandparents, as his godparents. Until that moment, he had been known just as "Burgundy". By 1761, the Duke was bound to his bed, unable to move his legs, with what was diagnosed as extra pulmonary tuberculosis of the bone. His younger brother, the future Louis XVI, served as his companion in the last few months of his life. After "excruciating suffering", the Duke died on 22 March 1761 at 9 years old.

== Ancestors ==
Ancestors of Louis, Duke of Burgundy (born 1751)

8. Louis, Duke of Burgundy
4. Louis XV of France
9. Marie Adélaïde of Savoy
2. Louis, Dauphin of France
10. Stanisław I of Poland
5. Marie Leszczyńska
11. Katarzyna Opalińska
1. Louis, Duke of Burgundy
12. Augustus II of Poland
6. Augustus III of Poland
13. Christiane Eberhardine of Bayreuth
3. Maria Josepha of Saxony
14. Joseph I, Holy Roman Emperor
7. Maria Josepha of Austria
15. Wilhelmine Amalie of Brunswick

== Sources ==
- Algrant, Christine Pevitt (2002). Madame de Pompadour: Mistress of France. New York: Grove Press. ISBN 978-0802140357.
- Broglie, Emmanuel de (1877). Le fils de Louis XV, Louis, dauphin de France, 1729-1765 (in French). E. Plon.
- Cronin, Vincent (1975). Louis and Antoinette. New York: William Morrow & Company, Inc. ISBN 978-0-688-00331-9.
- Faÿ, Bernard (1968). Louis XVI or The End of a World. Translated by Patrick O'Brian. Chicago: Henry Regnery Company. ISBN 978-0-491-00040-6.

Louis, Duke of Burgundy (born 1751) House of Bourbon Cadet branch of the Capetian dynasty Born: 13 September 1751 Died: 22 March 1761
French royalty
Preceded by Louis, Duke of Burgundy	Duke of Burgundy; 1751–1761	Succeeded by Alfonso, Duke of Anjou and Cádiz
