= Louis, Dauphin of France (born 1729) =

Heir to the French throne (1729–1765)

Louis
- Dauphin of France
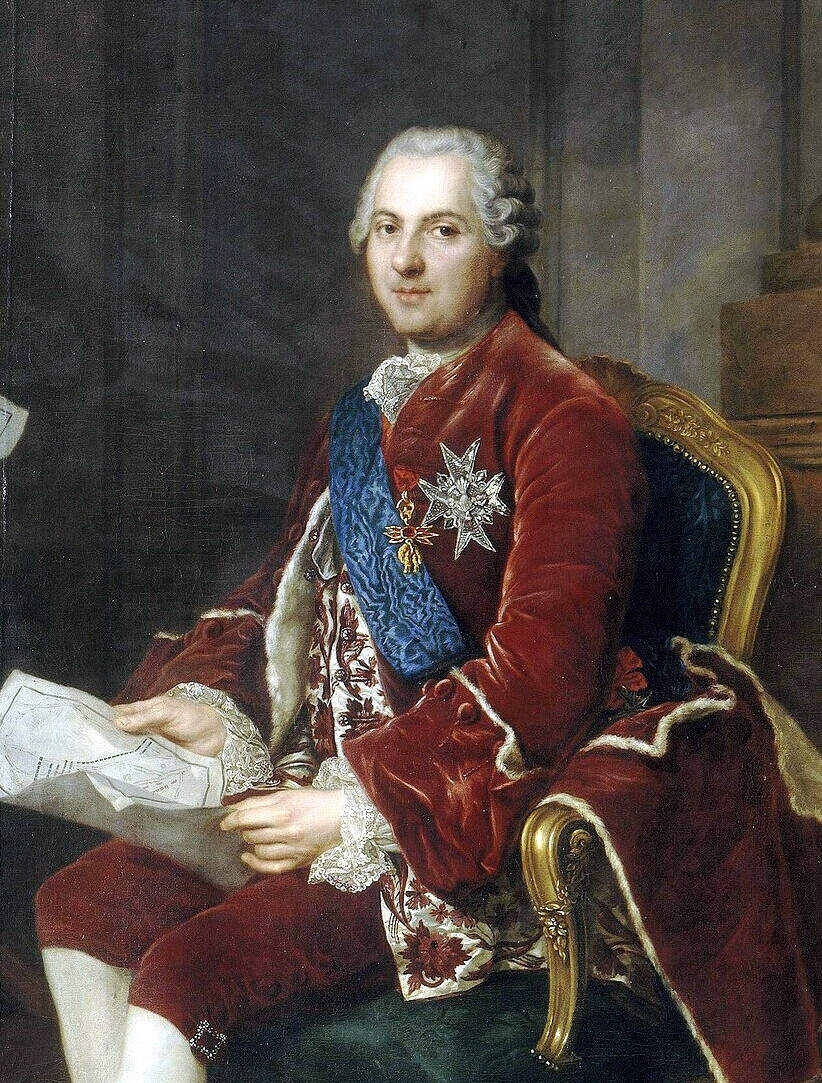
- Portrait by Anne-Baptiste Nivelon, 1764
- Born: 4 September 1729; Palace of Versailles, Paris, France
- Died: 20 December 1765 (aged 36); Château de Fontainebleau, France
- Burial: Cathédrale Saint-Étienne de Sens; Saint Denis Basilica (heart)
- Spouses: Infanta Maria Teresa Rafaela of Spain (m. 1744; died 1746) Duchess Maria Josepha of Saxony (m. 1747)
- Issue more...: Marie Zéphyrine; Louis, Duke of Burgundy; Xavier, Duke of Aquitaine; Louis XVI; Louis XVIII; Charles X; Clotilde, Queen of Sardinia; Élisabeth
Names
- French: Louis Ferdinand de France
- House: Bourbon
- Father: Louis XV
- Mother: Marie Leszczyńska
- Religion: Roman Catholicism

Louis, Dauphin of France (Louis Ferdinand; 4 September 1729 – 20 December 1765) was the elder and only surviving son of King Louis XV and Queen Marie Leszczyńska. As the son of the king, Louis was a fils de France. As heir apparent, he became Dauphin of France. Although he died before ascending to the throne himself, all three of his sons who made it to adulthood would go on to be King: Louis XVI (r. 1774–1793), Louis XVIII (r. 1814–1815, 1815–1824) and Charles X (r. 1824–1830).

== Early life and education ==
Louis's birth secured the throne and his mother's position at court, which previously had been precarious due to her giving birth to three daughters in a row before the birth of the Dauphin. He had a younger brother, Philippe, who died as a toddler.

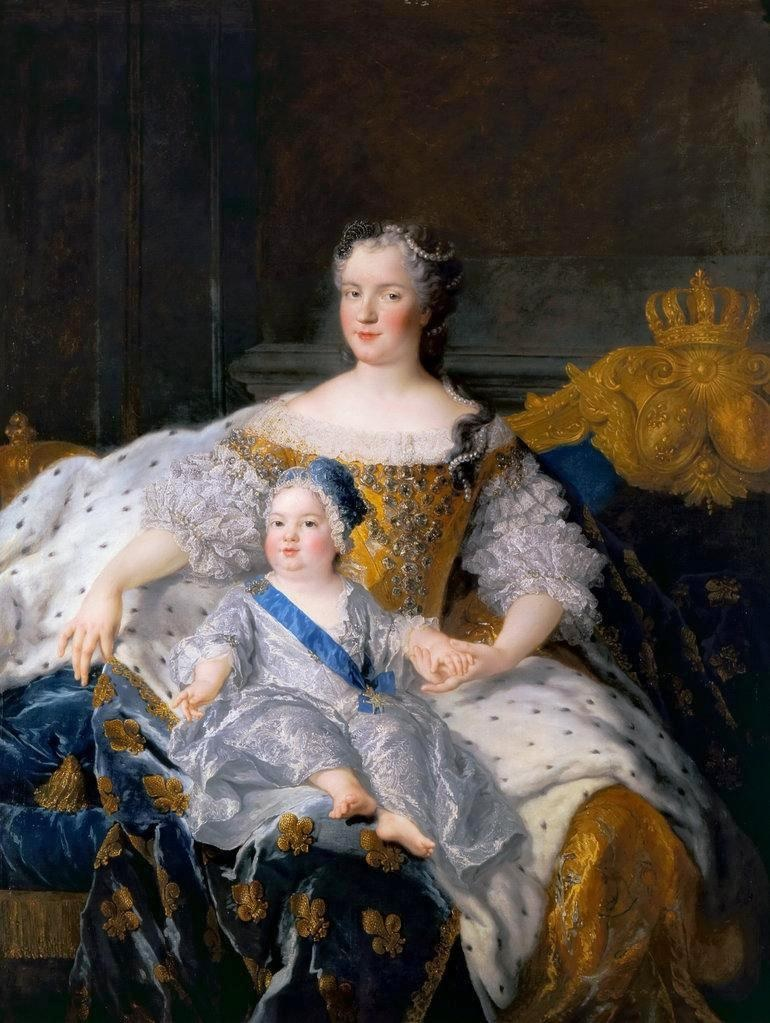
Louis with his mother Maria Leszczynska, c. 1730

Louis was baptised privately and without a name by Cardinal Armand Gaston Maximilien de Rohan. On 27 April 1737 when he was seven years old the public ceremony of the other baptismal rites took place. It was at this point that he was given the names Louis Ferdinand. His godparents were his cousin Louis, Duke of Orléans, and his great-grandaunt the Dowager Duchess of Bourbon.

Louis's governess was Madame de Ventadour who had previously served as his father's governess. When he was seven years old, the Duke of Châtillon was named his governor, the Count of Muy was named under-governor, and Jean-François Boyer, formerly bishop of Mirepoix, was named preceptor.

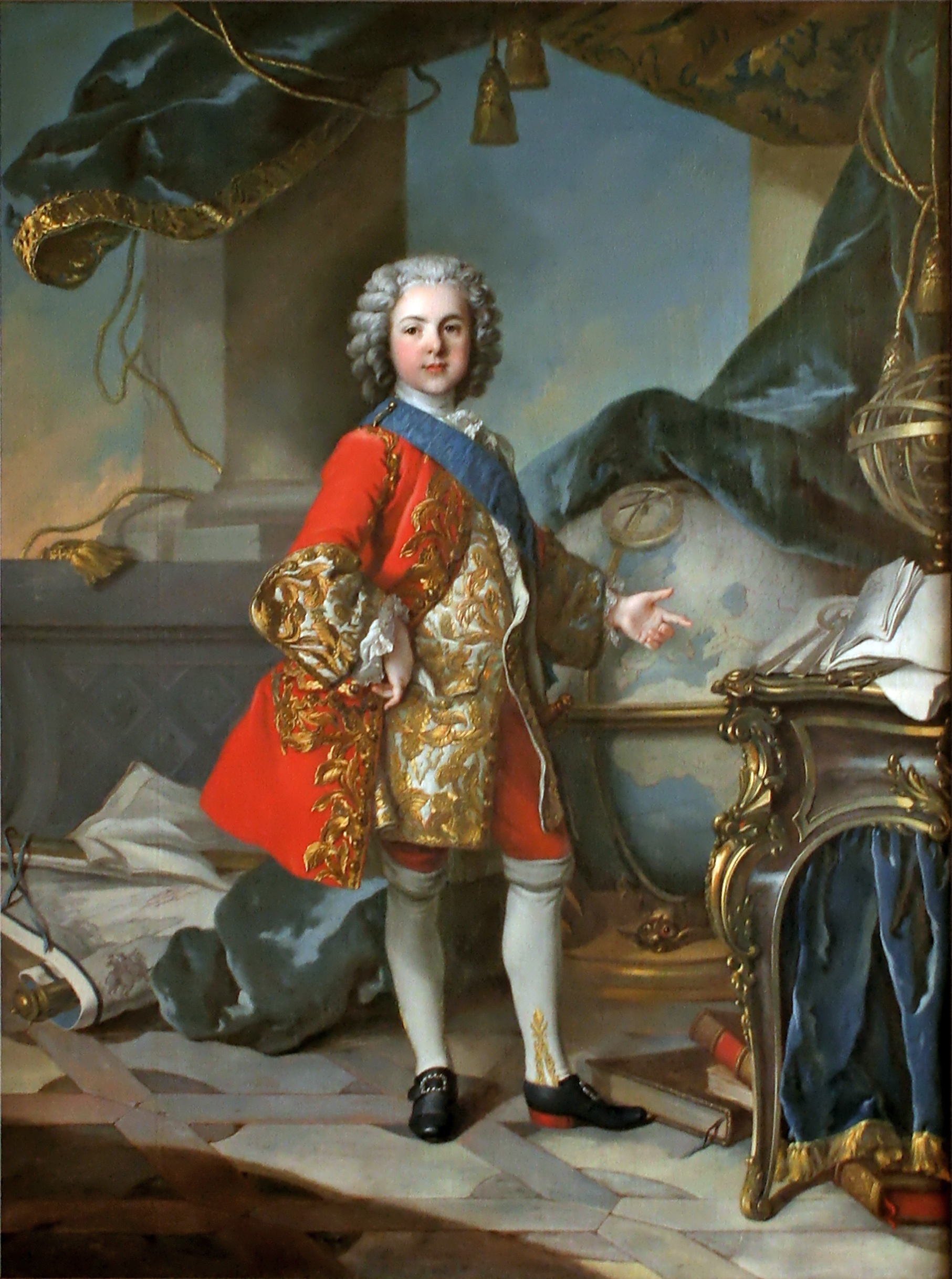
Louis de France at the age of 9 in a study with a globe and a fortification treatise, by Louis Tocqué

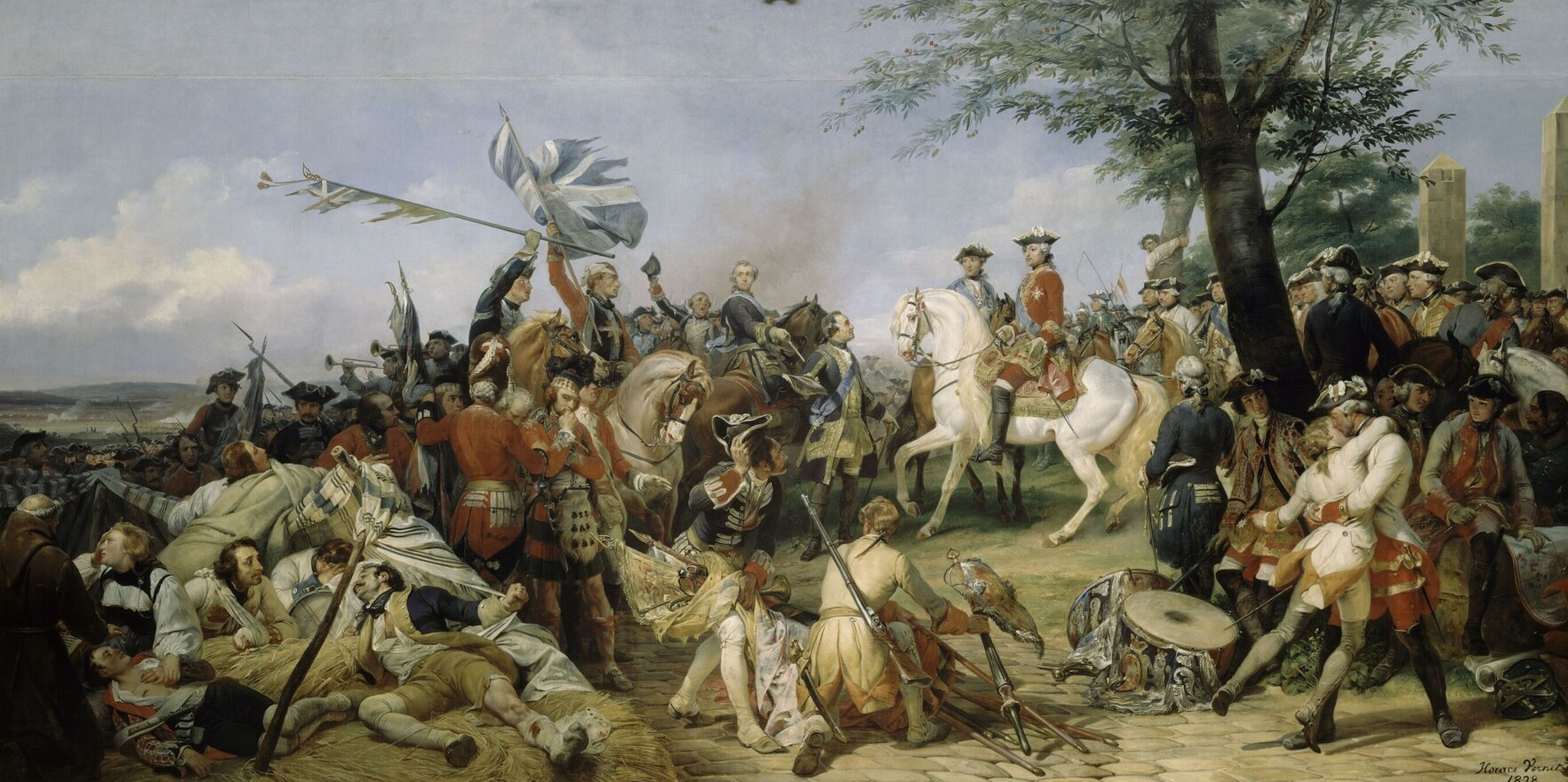
The Battle of Fontenoy by Horace Vernet. The Dauphin is on horseback beside his father.

From an early age Louis took a great interest in the military arts. He was bitterly disappointed when his father would not permit him to join the 1744 campaign in the War of the Austrian Succession. When his father became deathly ill with fever at Metz, Louis disobeyed orders and went to his bedside, much to the king's resentment. The incident resulted in the dismissal of Louis's beloved governor, the Duke of Châtillon. Later, in 1745, Louis was able to accompany his father on his Flanders campaign and witness the Battle of Fontenoy. After Fontenoy, Louis was not allowed to participate in battles, in part due to the king's escalating jealousy and increasingly distant attitude toward his son. He was very close and protective to his mother and sisters, especially Henriette.

== First marriage ==
In 1744, Louis XV negotiated a marriage between his 15-year-old son and the Dauphin's own first cousin once removed, the 18-year-old Infanta Maria Teresa Rafaela of Spain, daughter of King Philip V of Spain and Elisabeth Farnese. The marriage contract was signed on 13 December 1744; the marriage was celebrated by proxy in Madrid on 18 December and in person at Versailles on 23 February 1745.

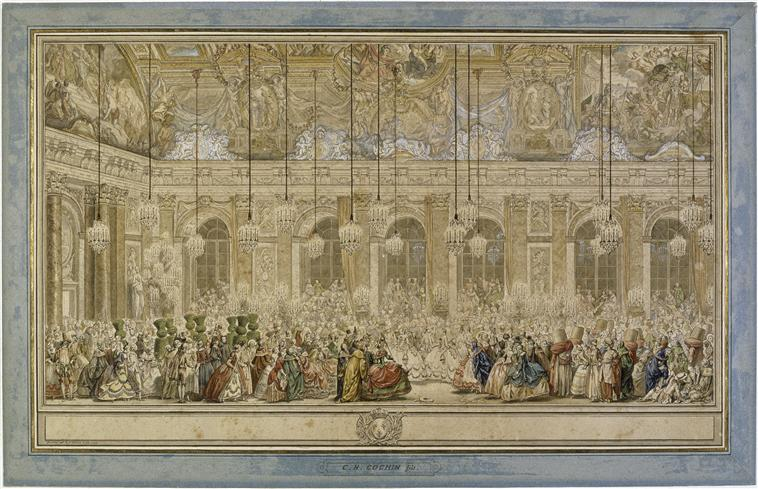
Masked ball at Versailles for the wedding of Louis, Dauphin of France, to María Teresa Rafaela of Spain, 1745.

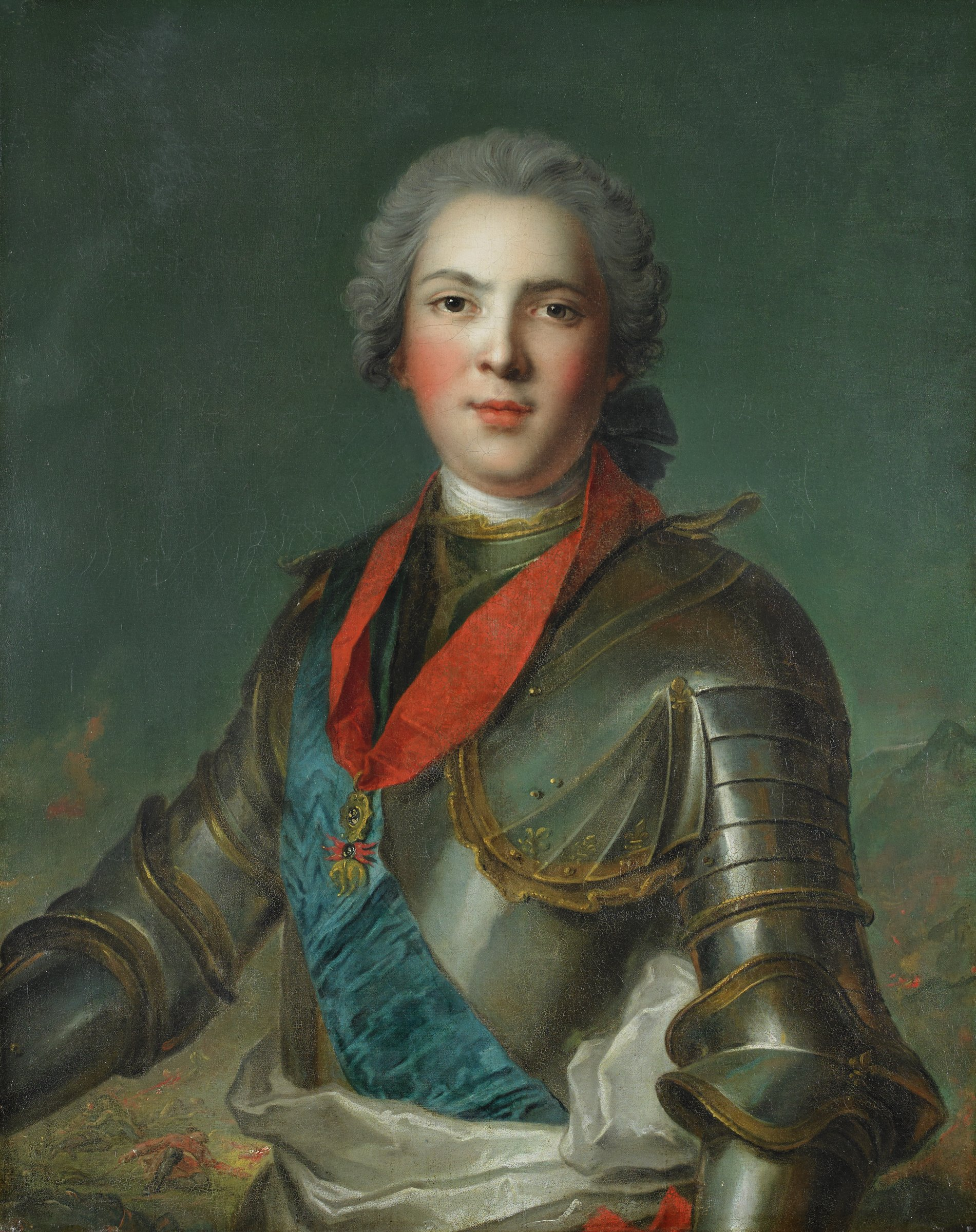
Louis, Dauphin of France, in 1750.

Louis and María Teresa Rafaela were well matched and had a real affection for each other. They had one daughter, Princess Marie Thérèse of France (19 July 1746 – 27 April 1748). Three days after the birth of their daughter, María Teresa Rafaela died on 22 July 1746. Louis was only 16 years old. He grieved intensely at the loss of his wife, but his responsibility to provide for the succession to the French crown required he marry again quickly.

In 1746, Louis received the Order of the Golden Fleece from his father-in-law, King Philip V of Spain.

== Second marriage ==
On 10 January 1747, Louis was married by proxy in Dresden to Maria Josepha of Saxony, the 16-year-old younger daughter of Augustus III, King of Poland and Elector of Saxony, and Archduchess Maria Josepha of Austria. A second marriage ceremony took place in person at Versailles on 9 February.

=== Children ===
- Miscarriage or false pregnancy* (15 March 1748)
- Miscarriage or false pregnancy* (30 January 1748)
- Miscarriage* (10 May 1749)
- Marie Zéphyrine (26 August 1750 – 1 September 1755); died in childhood.
- Louis Joseph of France, Duke of Burgundy (13 September 1751 – 22 March 1761); died in childhood.
- Miscarried or Stillborn daughter* (9 March 1752)
- Xavier of France, Duke of Aquitaine (8 September 1753 – 22 February 1754); died in infancy.
- Louis XVI (23 August 1754 – 21 January 1793); married Archduchess Maria Antonia of Austria and had issue.
- Louis XVIII (17 November 1755 – 16 September 1824); married Princess Maria Giuseppina of Savoy, had two miscarried children.
- Miscarriage or false pregnancy* (25 October 1756)
- Charles X of France (9 October 1757 – 6 November 1836); married Maria Theresa of Savoy and had issue.
- Clotilde, Queen of Sardinia (23 September 1759 – 7 March 1802); married Charles Emmanuel IV of Sardinia, no issue.
- Miscarriage, stillbirth, or false pregnancy* (1762)
- Élisabeth (3 May 1764 – 10 May 1794); died unmarried.

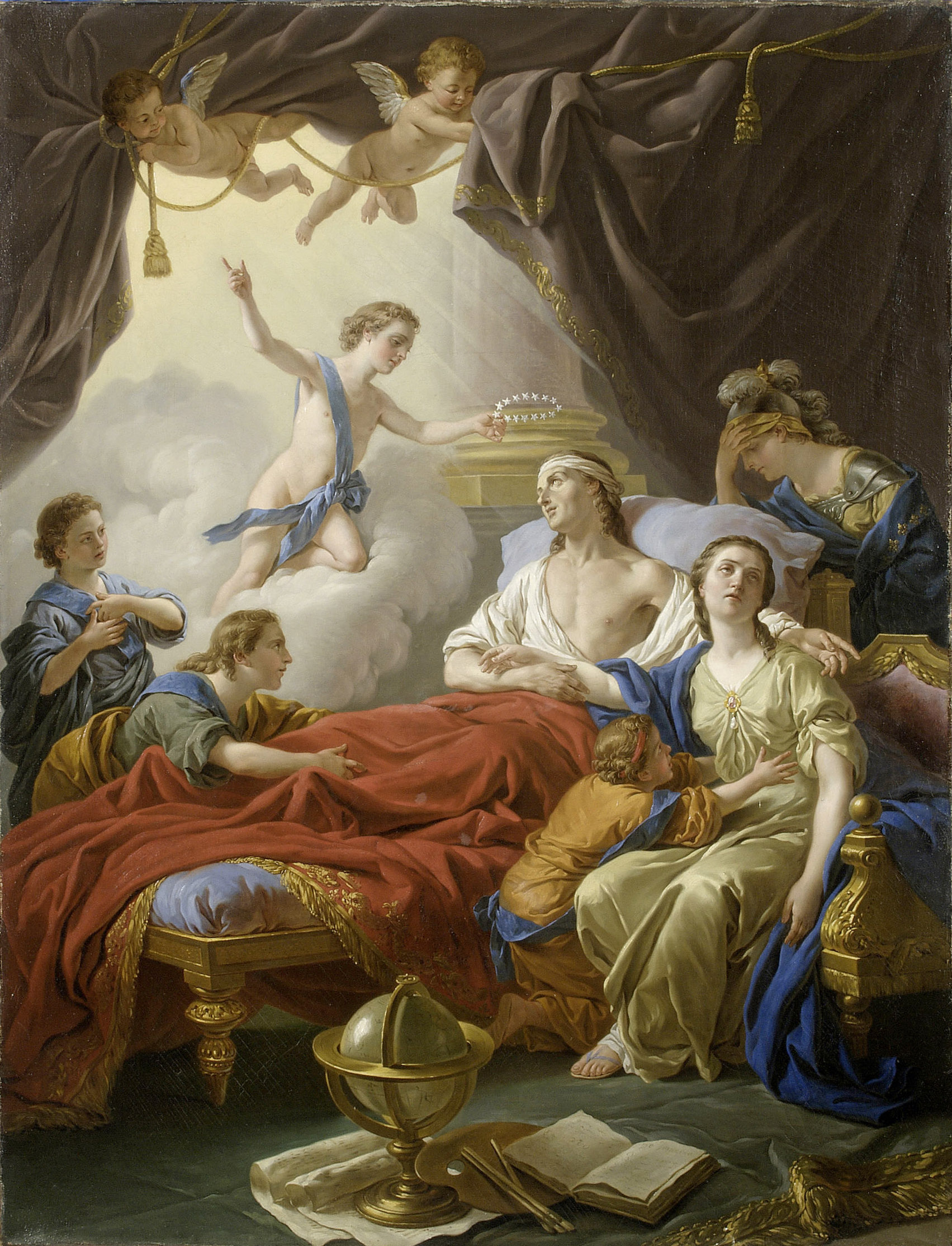
Allegory on the Death of the Dauphin by Louis-Jean-François Lagrenée, 1765.

== Personality ==
Louis was well educated: a studious man, cultivated, and a lover of music, he preferred the pleasures of conversation to those of hunting, balls, or spectacles. With a keen sense of morality, he was very much committed and faithful to his wife, Marie-Josèphe, and disapproved of his father's mistresses. Family friend Duke de Luynes and Abbe de Proyart noted in their memoirs that like his pious mother, Louis even at a young age, donated much of his money in supporting various charitable causes for the poor which made him popular with the French populace.

Very devout, he was a fervent supporter of the Jesuits, like his mother and sisters, and was led by them to have a devotion to the Sacred Heart. He appeared in the eyes of his sisters as the ideal of the Christian prince, in sharp contrast with their father, who was a notorious womanizer.

== Later life and death ==
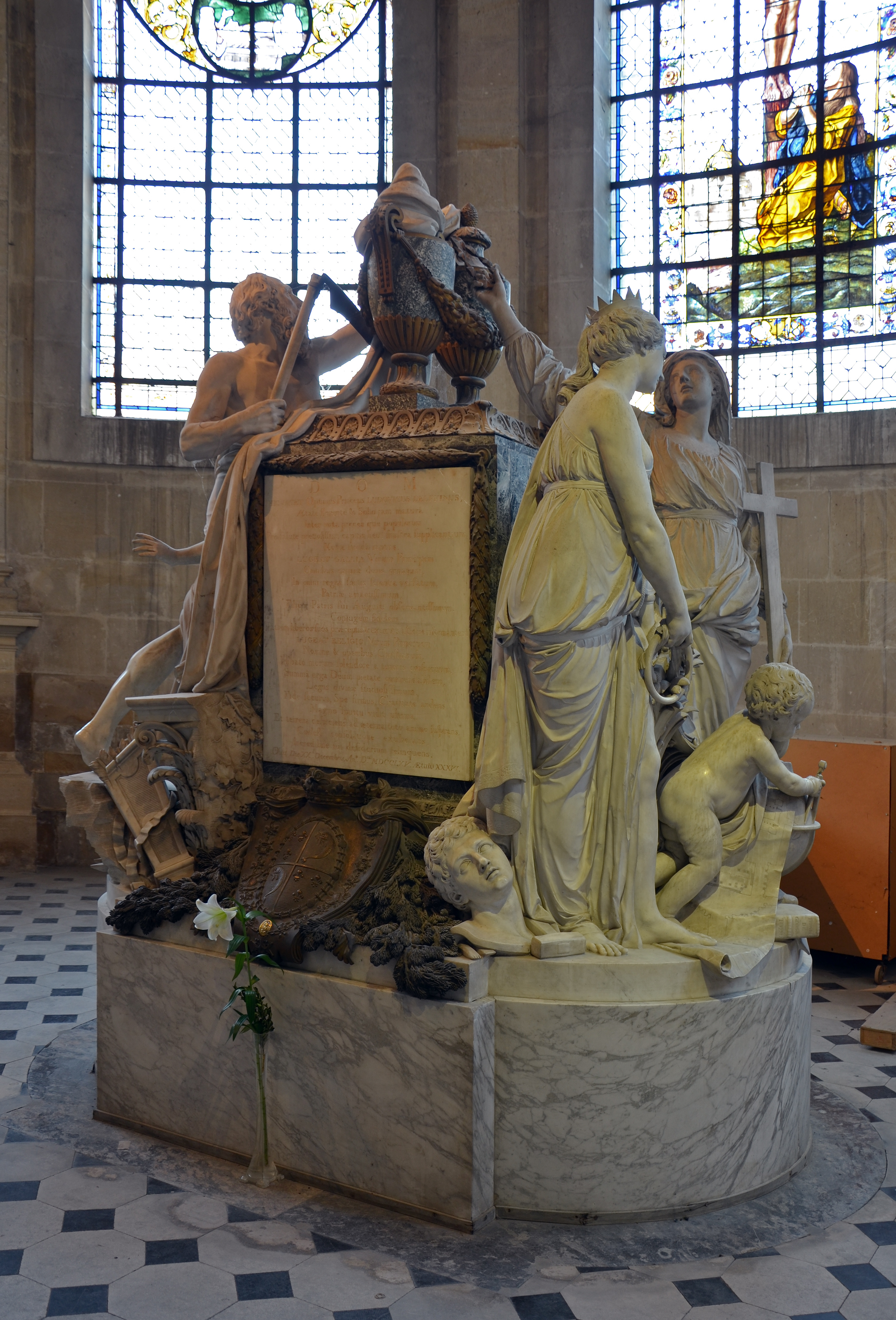
The Tomb of Louis, Dauphin of France & Marie-Josephe of Saxony, in Sens Cathedral.

Kept away from government affairs by his father, Louis was at the center of the Dévots, a group of religiously minded men who hoped to gain power when he succeeded to the throne.

Louis died of tuberculosis at Fontainebleau in 1765 at the age of 36, while his father was still alive, so he never became king of France. His mother, Queen Marie Leszczyńska, and his maternal grandfather, the former king of Poland, Stanislaus I Leszczyński, Duke of Lorraine, also survived him. His eldest surviving son, Louis-Auguste, duc de Berry, became the new dauphin, ascending the throne as Louis XVI in May 1774.

Louis was buried in the Cathedral of Saint-Étienne in Sens at the Monument to the Dauphin of France & Marie-Josephe of Saxony, designed and executed by Guillaume Coustou, the Younger. His heart was buried at the Saint Denis Basilica, next to his first wife.

== Ancestry ==
Ancestors of Louis of France

8. Louis, Dauphin of France
4. Louis, Duke of Burgundy
9. Duchess Maria Anna Victoria of Bavaria
2. Louis XV of France
10. Victor Amadeus II of Sardinia
5. Princess Adélaïde of Savoy
11. Princess Anne Marie of Orléans
1. Louis, Dauphin of France
12. Rafał Leszczyński
6. Stanislaus I of Poland
13. Anna Jabłonowska
3. Marie Leszczyńska
14. Jan Karol Opaliński
7. Katarzyna Opalińska
15. Zofia Czarnkowska

== Sources ==
- Bernier, Olivier (1984). Louis the Beloved: the Life of Louis XV. New York: Doubleday. ISBN 978-0385184021.
- Broglie, Emmanuel de (1877). Le fils de Louis XV, Louis, dauphin de France, 1729-1765. E. Plon.
- Cronin, Vincent (1975). Louis and Antoinette. New York: William Morrow & Company, Inc.
- Haggard, Andrew (1906). The Real Louis the Fifteenth. London: Hutchinson.
- Jones, Colin (2003). The Great Nation: France from Louis XV to Napoleon. New York: Penguin Books. ISBN 978-0140130935.
- Mitford, Nancy (1976). Madame de Pompadour. London: Sphere Books.
- Perkins, James Breck (1897). France Under Louis XV.
- Algrant, Christine Pevitt (2002). Madame de Pompadour: Mistress of France. New York: Grove Press. ISBN 978-0802140357.

Louis, Dauphin of France House of Bourbon Cadet branch of the Capetian dynasty Born: 4 September 1729 Died: 20 December 1765
French royalty
Vacant Title last held by Louis	Dauphin of France; 4 September 1729 – 20 December 1765	Succeeded by Louis-Auguste
