= List of ship launches in 1769 =

The list of ship launches in 1769 includes a chronological list of some ships launched in 1769.

Date	Ship	Class	Builder	Location	Country	Notes
11 January	Oiseau	Frigate		Toulon	Kingdom of France	For French Navy.
12 January	San Francisco de Paula	San Francisco de Paula-class ship of the line		Havana	(Spain) Cuba	For Spanish Navy.
28 February	Ercole	Fourth rate	Zuane Verdua	Venice	Republic of Venice	For Venetian Navy.
3 March	Nuestra Señora de la Santísima Trinidad	First rate	Mateo Mullan	Havana	(Spain) Cuba	For Spanish Navy.
22 March	Bien-Aimé	Bien-Aimé-class ship of the line	La Frete Bernard	Lorient	Kingdom of France	For French Navy.
11 August	Abrewach	Schooner	Joseph-Louis Ollivier	Brest	Kingdom of France	For French Navy.
11 August	Nanon	Schooner		Brest	Kingdom of France	For French Navy.
14 August	La Marie	Marie-class corvette		Lorient	Kingdom of France	For Compagnie des Indes.
17 August	Le Mars	Indien-class East Indiaman	Gilles Cambry	Lorient	Kingdom of France	For Compagnie des Indes.
18 September	Queen	Second rate	William Gray	Woolwich Dockyard	Great Britain	For Royal Navy.
30 September	Bridgewater	East Indiaman	William Dudman	Deptford	Great Britain	For Company.
2 October	Salisbury	Salisbury-class ship of the line	Joseph Harris	Chatham Dockyard	Great Britain	For Royal Navy.
17 October	Elizabeth	Elizabeth-class ship of the line		Portsmouth Dockyard	Great Britain	For Royal Navy.
17 October	Worcester	Worcester-class ship of the line	Thomas Bucknall	Portsmouth Dockyard	Great Britain	For Royal Navy.
13 November	Royal Oak	Royal Oak-class ship of the line	Israel Pownoll	Plymouth Dockyard	Great Britain	For Royal Navy.
17 November	Stafford	East Indiaman	Wells	Deptford	Great Britain	For British East India Company.
6 December	Santo Domingo	San Juan Nepomuceno-class ship of the line	Manuel de Zuibira	Guarnizo	Spain	For Spanish Navy.
14 December	San José	San Francisco de Paula-class ship of the line		Havana	(Spain) Cuba	For Spanish Navy.
30 December	Swallow	Swallow-class ship-sloop	Adam Hayes	Deptford Dockyard	Great Britain	For Royal Navy.
Unknown date	Alexander	Full-rigged ship		Bombay	India	For private owner.
Unknown date	Eendracht	Sixth rate	Willem Lodwijk van Genth	Harlingen	Dutch Republic	For Dutch Navy.
Unknown date	Elephanten	Third rate		Copenhagen	Denmark-Norway	For Dano-Norwegian Navy.
Unknown date	Griffifth	Full-rigged ship		Bombay	India	For private owner.
Unknown date	Harpooner	Whaler		Whitby	Great Britain	For private owner.
Unknown date	Le Jean Baptiste II	Merchantman		Saint-Malo	Kingdom of France	For private owner.
Unknown date	Louve	Cat		Rochefort	Kingdom of France	For French Navy.
Unknown date	Rossignol	Corvette		Brest	Kingdom of France	For French Navy.
Unknown date	Mars	Fifth rate	John May	Amsterdam	Dutch Republic	For Dutch Navy.
Unknown date	Mavi Kıçlı	Fifth rate			Ottoman Empire	For Ottoman Navy.
Unknown date	North Star	Sloop	Nicholas Bools	Bridport	Great Britain	For Robert Gordon.
Unknown date	Parnassus	West Indiaman		River Thames	Great Britain	For private owner.
Unknown date	Preston	Brig		Liverpool	Great Britain	For private owner.
Unknown date	Prinses Louisa	Fourth rate		Amsterdam	Dutch Republic	For Royal Navy.
Unknown date	Prinses Royaal Fredrika Sophia	Third rate		Amsterdam	Dutch Republic	For Dutch Navy.
Unknown date	San Nicholas de Bari	Third rate	Guillermo Turner	Carthagena	Spain	For Spanish Navy.
Unknown date	Seyf-i Bahri	Third rate			Ottoman Empire	For Ottoman Navy.
Unknown date	Tamerlane	Merchantman		Bermuda	(Kingdom of Great Britain) Bermuda	For private owner.
Unknown date	Waakzamheid	Sixth rate	Peter Edwards	Amsterdam	Dutch Republic	For Dutch Navy.
