= Françoise de Chalus =

French royal mistress (1734–1821)

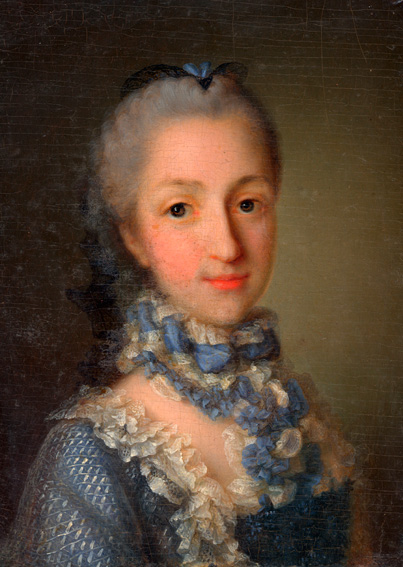
- Born: 24 February 1734
- Died: 7 July 1821 (aged 87)
- Spouse: Don Jean François (m. 1749)
- Issue: Philippe de Narbonne-Lara; Louis, comte de Narbonne-Lara

Françoise de Chalus (bap. Chalus, 24 February 1734 - Paris, 7 July 1821), was a French noblewoman and courtier. She was the mother of Louis, comte de Narbonne-Lara, possibly by King Louis XV. She was the lady-in-waiting of Louise Élisabeth of France in 1749–59, and the influential favorite lady-in-waiting of Princess Adélaïde of France in 1764–1800.

== Life ==
Françoise de Chalus was the daughter of Gabriel de Chalus, seigneur de Sansac, and Claire Dégéraud de Solage.

=== Lady-in-waiting to Louise Élisabeth ===
On 10 July 1749, she married a noble of Spanish descent Don Jean François, 1er duc de Narbonne-Lara Grandee of Spain 1st Class, Lieutenant General of the Army, Commander in Name of the King of the Dioceses of Castres, Albi and Lavaur, 1st Gentleman of the House of H.R.H. the Duke of Parma (Aubiac, Lot-et-Garonne, 27 December 1718 - 12 August 1806). Her spouse was a member of the Spanish entourage of Louise Élisabeth of France, who visited the French court at that time. Françoise de Chalus left France for the Duchy of Parma in Italy with her spouse in the retinue of Élisabeth of France, and served for ten years as her lady-in-waiting.

=== Circumstances around her son ===
In 1755, she gave birth to her second son, Louis, comte de Narbonne-Lara. It is alleged that Louis XV was the biological father of the child. According to documents of the Military Archive, her husband Jean François de Narbonne-Lara had been wounded 8 years earlier in the War of the Austrian Succession (1747), becoming from that moment on unable of having any offspring. The baptism of Louis, comte de Narbonne-Lara is another indication of that paternity. His name was Louis, and his contemporaries remarked about the similarities between Louis and the King.

=== Lady-in-waiting to Adélaïde ===
Upon the death of Élisabeth of France in 1759, Françoise de Chalus settled in France, and in 1764, she succeeded the marquise de Civrac as dame d'atour to Madame Adélaïde; she was promoted to dame d'honneur after the duchesse de Beauvillier in 1781. She reportedly rivaled with the duchess de Civrac, dame d'honneur of Madame Victoire, in an attempt to distance the two sisters. After the accession of Louis XVI in 1774, she belonged to what was called the "Old Court" of the Mesdames at Bellevue. She was described as haughty and imperious, and while Civrac successfully hosted parties in the name of Madame Victoire, Narbonne (Françoise de Chalus) was reportedly not as successful, as her temperament did not attract people socially.

A rumor claimed that it was in fact Madame Adélaïde who was the biological mother of Louis de Narbonne by an incestuous relation to her father, Louis XV. There is nothing to indicate that these rumors were true, though Louis de Narbonne was appointed the chevalier d'honneur of Adélaïde, and was reportedly her spoiled favorite as well as the son of her favorite lady-in-waiting, and she reportedly "made enormous sacrifices to his caprices". His mother reportedly regularly made Adélaïde pay his debts:

"Mme. de Narbonne, imperious as she was, was entirely dominated by the whims of her son Comte Louis. When he had committed any foolishness and was in want of money, her ill-temper was unbearable, and she vented it chiefly upon Madame Adelaide, making her house intolerable. After a few days the poor Princess would buy back her peace of mind in hard cash. In this way the Comte de Narbonne became possessed of enormous sums, which he procured without the least trouble and accepted as easily."

=== Exile ===
Françoise de Chalus was the only lady-in-waiting Adélaïde allowed to accompany her from the Palace of Versailles after the Women's March on Versailles on the outbreak of the French Revolution on 6 October 1789. In February 1791, she belonged to the large retinue that accompanied Adélaïde and her sister Victoire from France to Rome. During their stay in Rome in 1791–96, the court of the Mesdames were divided into two rival factions led by the head lady-in-waiting of Madame Adélaïde, de Narbonne, and her colleague in the court of Madame Victoire, Angélique Victoire, Comtesse de Chastellux, who were called the Narbonne faction and the Chastellux faction.
