= Tamerlane (ship) =

Several ships have been named Tamerlane for Tamerlane:

- Tamerlane (1769 ship) was launched in 1769 in Bermuda. She first appeared in British records in 1788 and then carried out three voyages as a whaler in the British Southern Whale Fishery. Next, she made one voyage as a slave ship. French frigates captured and burnt her in 1794.
- Tamerlane (1824 ship) was launched in New Brunswick in 1824. She transferred her registry to Liverpool. She sailed between Scotland and Canada and then in 1828 sailed to India under a license from the British East India Company (EIC). After two voyages to India she returned to trading in the Western hemisphere. Her crew abandoned her in the Channel on 26 February 1848.
