= Louis Marie de Narbonne-Lara =

French noble, soldier, diplomat (1755–1813)

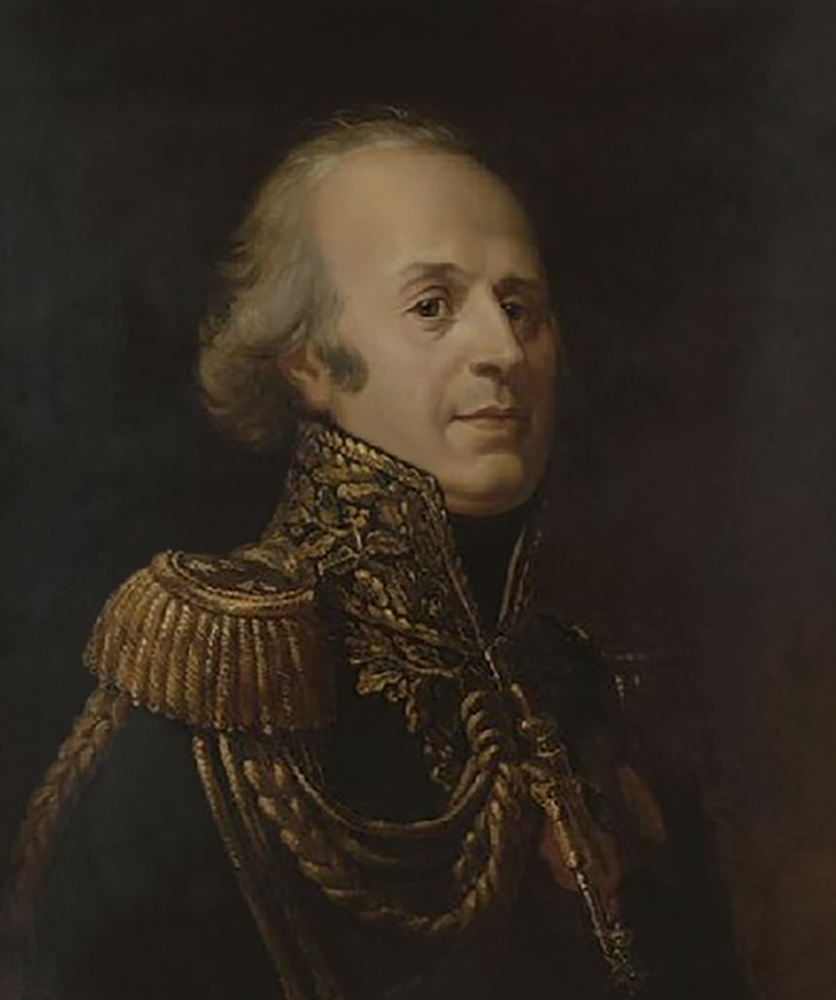
- Born: 23 August 1755
- Died: 17 November 1813 (aged 58)
- Spouse: Marie Adélaïde de Montholon (m. 1782)
- Issue: 4 (2 legitimate, 2 illegitimate)
- Father: Don Jean François, 1er duc de Narbonne-Lara (officially); Louis XV (allegedly)
- Mother: Françoise de Chalus

Louis Marie Jacques Amalric de Narbonne-Lara, vicomte de Narbonne-Lara (23 August 1755 – 17 November 1813) was a French nobleman, soldier and diplomat.

Born at Colorno in the Duchy of Parma, Louis Marie, vicomte de Narbonne-Lara, was possibly the illegitimate son of King Louis XV. Raised at Versailles and educated with a focus on classical studies and military training, he became colonel of the Army at 25. He married Marie Adélaïde de Montholon, with whom he had two daughters, and also had two illegitimate children.

Narbonne-Lara held various military and diplomatic roles throughout his life. During the French Revolution, he served as Minister of War under Louis XVI but resigned due to disagreements with the Feuillants. He later joined the Army of the North and was promoted to lieutenant general. After the fall of the monarchy, he fled France and returned in 1801.

Napoleon called him into service in 1809, and he held several prominent positions, including Governor of Raab, divisional general commander in Trieste, and minister plenipotentiary in Bavaria. He advised Napoleon against invading Russia but was not heeded. Following the Russian Campaign, he served as the French ambassador in Vienna and Governor of Torgau. He died of typhus in 1813, and his name was inscribed on the Arc de Triomphe.

== Birth and early life ==
He was born at Colorno, in the Duchy of Parma. His mother was Françoise de Chalus (bap. Château de Châlus-Chabrol, Châlus, Haute-Vienne, 24 February 1734 – Paris, 7 July 1821, daughter of Gabriel de Châlus, seigneur de Sansac, and Claire Gérault de Solages), one of the ladies-in-waiting of Elizabeth, Duchess of Parma and Chamberlain-Major of Princess Marie Adélaïde of France.

Her husband was a nobleman of Spanish descent, Don Jean François, 1er duc de Narbonne-Lara. He was a Grandee of Spain 1st Class, Lieutenant General of the Army, Commander in Name of the King of the Dioceses of Castres, Albi and Lavaur, 1st Gentleman of the House of H.R.H. the Duke of Parma (Aubiac, Lot-et-Garonne, 27 December 1718 – 12 August 1806). The father was son of François de Narbonne-Lara, seigneur d'Aubiac (descendant of the Viscounts of Narbonne), and his second wife Olympie Angélique de Goth (related to Pope Clement V).

His parents married on 10 July 1749. They had an older son Don Philippe, the 2e duc de Narbonne-Lara, who died without issue.

However, it is alleged that Louis XV himself was the real father. The coevals attribute the count's paternity to the King of France Louis XV. According to documents of the Military Archive, the comte Jean François de Narbonne-Lara had been wounded eight years earlier in the War of the Austrian Succession (1747), becoming from that moment on unable of having any offspring. The baptism of Louis, comte de Narbonne-Lara is another indication of that paternity. His wife became thus the King's mistress. Not only was the comte's name also Louis, but his contemporaries always remarked about the similarities between Louis and the King.

He was brought up at Versailles with the Princesses of France. His education was princely, inclined mostly towards the Classical studies and a rigid military formation; he frequented the main courts of Europe, where he was able to familiarize with the foreign languages (German and English), which also contributed to his diplomatic formation.

He was made Colonel of the Army at the age of twenty-five.

== Marriage and issue ==
He married Marie Adélaïde (sometimes Adélaïde Marie) de Montholon, Lady of Madame Victoire of France, daughter of Louis XV, on 16 April 1782 at Paris, France, with whom he had two daughters. She was the daughter of Nicolas de Montholon (son of Pierre de Montholon and Marguerite Baron, married on 11 June 1711) and Marguerite Fournier de la Chapelle (daughter of Charles Fournier de la Chapelle and Marie Louise Dureau). Their daughters were:

- Louise Amable Rion Françoise de Narbonne-Lara (Nice, 25 May 1786 – Lisbon, 28 March 1849), Dame of Honour of Her Majesty Queen Maria II of Portugal (with right to the Grandeeship of Spain for being representative of her paternal uncle the 2e duc de Narbonne-Lara), who married at Agen on 17 February 1806 the Portuguese of Dutch descent Hermano José Braamcamp de Almeida Castelo Branco, 5th Lord, 2nd Baron, 1st Viscount and 1st Count of Sobral (16 September 1775 – Lisbon, 2 February 1846), and had two daughters
- Marie Adélaïde Charlotte de Narbonne-Lara (Belleville, 11 May 1790 – Champgrenon, 31 May 1856), who married at Agen on 7 March 1808 Claude-Philibert Barthelot, comte de Rambuteau (Mâcon, 9 November 1781 – Château de Rambuteau, 11 April 1869), and had two daughters

Out of wedlock he had by Jeanne Pitrot-Verteil one son:

- Louis Jean Amalric de Narbonne-Lara, born in Paris, unmarried and without issue

And by Louise-Jeanne-Françoise Contat (16 June 1760 – 9 March 1813), actress with the Comédie-Française, one daughter:

- Louise Amalrique Bathilde Isidore Contat de Narbonne-Lara (Saint-Pierre-de-Chaillot, Paris, 21 September 1788 – ?), who married in Paris on 2 December 1811 Jan Frederik Abbema (born in Amsterdam on 13 June 1773) and had one son:
  - Émile-Léon, vicomte Abbéma, who had an only daughter by his wife Henriette Anne d'Astoin:
    - Louise Abbéma (Étampes, 30 October 1853 – Paris, 4 August 1927), unmarried and without issue

== Early career ==
He is found in 1785 as a colonel of the Army and honorary chamberlain of Princess Madame Marie Adélaïde of France. In 1786 he was the commander of an infantry regiment, and remained in that post until the evenings of the French Revolution.

== French Revolution ==
His liberal ideas soon made him be one of the first inscribed in the Club de Valois, where the Duke of Orléans presided. He was afterwards appointed commander of the National Guard in Franche-Comté. His friendship with Talleyrand brought him an appointment to command a special guard, composed of the most disciplined soldiers of the National Guard of Paris.

He became maréchal de camp in 1791, and, through the influence of Madame de Staël, was appointed Minister of War of Louis XVI. In this office he tried at all cost to impose his constitutional project, helped by the Bishop of Autun, Baumetz and Chapelier. But he showed incapacity in this post, and gave in his resignation. Despite his efforts, he did not carry his point, for in March 1792 the King, moved by intrigues and by the intransigence of those who surrounded him, thought right to dismiss him from that Ministry. His resignation was the result of his disagreements with the Feuillants on the question of foreign war. Narbonne-Lara and his friends hoped to bring on the war with Austria, by which they hoped to restore the prestige of the monarchy. Narbonne-Lara made an alliance with the Marquis de Lafayette, but their schemes were defeated. After his resignation, he joined the Army of the North and, in May 1792, he was elevated to Lieutenant General of the Army. After less than six months from his dismissal, the French Monarchy was agonizing, the French Republic was proclaimed and the Royal Family was incarcerated. Later, Narbonne actually incurred suspicion as a Feuillant. The comte de Narbonne-Lara also had on him a prison warrant. Due to this, and also to questions about his policy at the war office, he managed to seek refuge at the Embassy of Sweden, emigrated after 10 August 1792, and later evaded to London and from there to Germany, having visited England, Switzerland and Germany. During the Consulate, his friends Talleyrand and Fouché managed to remove his name from the list of the wanted, and returned to France in 1801, where he was retired with the patent of Divisional General.

== In Napoleon's service ==
In 1809 Napoleon remembered him and called him into his service. Brilliant, cultivated and perfectly aware of the uses of the Ancien Régime, persona grata with the main Courts of Europe, skilled diplomat and military, he was the ideal person to be at Napoleon's side. As such, he was reintegrated and re-entered the Army with his former post of lieutenant general and appointed Governor of Raab, with the command of the whole part of Hungary occupied by the imperial troops. After the signed peace with Hungary, he was appointed Divisional General Commander of the 4th Military Division in Trieste. In that same year of 1809 he was sent to Vienna to arrange the marriage of the Emperor with Archduchess Marie Louise. In 1810 he was subsequently appointed Minister Plenipotentiary in Bavaria at Munich, next to King Maximilian I, whom he knew very well before the Revolution, and in 1811 aide-de-camp to Napoleon. He was created an Officer of the Legion of Honour and Grand Cross of the Order of Saint Hubert.

In 1812 he went on diplomatic mission to Prussia; this mission had the purpose of ascertaining King Frederick William III towards his attitude in case France went to war with Russia. In returning to Paris, de Narbonne-Lara advised Napoleon not to invade Russia, but his advice was not followed; and so he reassumed his place in the Imperial Army on the Russian border. When he arrived there, he was sent by Napoleon to the city of Wilna, where the Tsar was; the comte de Narbonne-Lara was the bearer of an ultimatum, to which Alexander I categorically refused.

The tragic outcome of the Russian Campaign did not minimize the action of the Officers of the Imperial Army. Among them, he was outstanding for his military uprightness and exemplary behaviour; in the whirl of the retreat, he appeared dauntless and serene, his presence imposed confidence and respect to the demoralized troops. Mounted on his horse beside the carriage of the defeated Napoleon, he was the personification of the dignity and honour of the Ancien Régime.

In 1813 he was appointed and sent as French Ambassador at Vienna, where he was engaged in an unequal diplomatic duel with Metternich during the fateful months that witnessed the defection of Austria from the cause of Napoleon to that of the Allies, to confirm the alliance between France and Austria, an objective he was not able to fulfill; the Empire had its days cut short. In that same year he was appointed governor of the stronghold of Torgau (Saxony), one of the main strategic points for the defense of the Empire. On 17 November 1813, after reviewing the troops on horse, he died of typhus. His aide-de-camp, Captain comte de Rohan-Chabot, brought his heart back to France, and afterwards the name of the comte de Narbonne-Lara was inscribed on the east side of the Arc de Triomphe.

== Ancestry ==
Putative Ancestors of Louis, comte de Narbonne-Lara

8. François, vicomte de Narbonne-Lara
4. François de Narbonne-Lara, seigneur d'Aubiac
9. Charlotte d'Esparbès de Lussan
2. Jean François, 1er duc de Narbonne-Lara
5. Olympie Angélique de Goth
1. Louis Marie Jacques Amalric, comte de Narbonne-Lara
12. François Gabriel de Chalus, seigneur de Sansac
6. Gabriel de Chalus, seigneur de Sansac
13. Marie-Anne André de La Ronade
3. Françoise de Chalus
7. Claire Gérault de Solages

Actual Ancestors of Louis, comte de Narbonne-Lara

8. Louis, Dauphin of France
4. Louis, Dauphin of France and Duke of Burgundy
9. Duchess Maria Anna of Bavaria
2. Louis XV of France
10. Victor Amadeus II of Sardinia
5. Marie-Adélaïde of Savoy
11. Anne Marie d'Orléans
1. Louis Marie Jacques Amalric, comte de Narbonne-Lara
12. François Gabriel de Chalus, seigneur de Sansac
6. Gabriel de Chalus, seigneur de Sansac
13. Marie-Anne André de La Ronade
3. Françoise de Chalus
7. Claire Gérault de Solages

== Sources ==
- AF Villemain, Souvenirs contemporains (Paris, 1854), Domingos de Araújo Afonso et alii, Le Sang de Louis XIV (Braga, 1961), Tome I, p. 276 and Filipe Folque de Mendoça, A Casa Loulé e Suas Alianças, Livraria Bizantina, 1.ª Edição, Lisboa, 1995, pp. 171–172.

Political offices
Preceded by Louis Lebègue Duportail	Ministers of War; 7 December 1791 – 9 March 1792	Succeeded by Pierre Marie de Grave
