= Angélique Victoire, Comtesse de Chastellux =

French comtesse (1752–1816)

Angélique Victoire de Durfort
- Comtesse de Chastellux
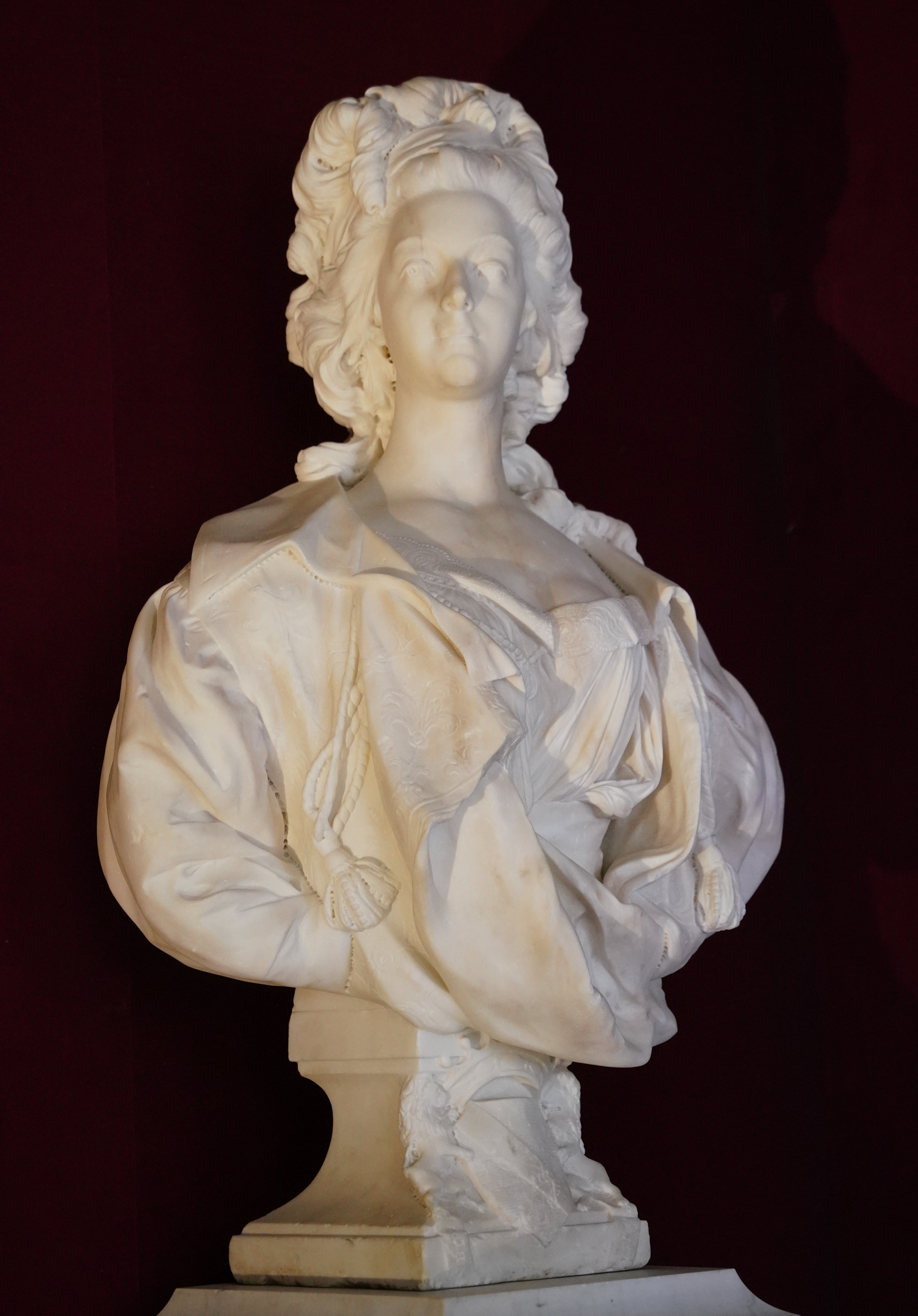
- Born: 2 December 1752
- Died: 14 November 1816 (aged 63); Paris, France
- Noble family: Durfort
- Husband: Henri Georges César
- Father: Aymeric Joseph de Durfort
- Mother: Anne-Marie de La Faurie de Monbadan

Angélique Victoire de Durfort-Civrac (2 December 1752 – 14 November 1816), Countess of Chastellux, was a French courtier. She served as dame d'honneur to Madame Victoire, daughter of King Louis XV, from 1786 to 1799.

== Life ==
She was born to Aimeric Joseph de Durfort-Civrac, duc de Civrac, and Anne-Marie de La Faurie de Monbadan (1720–1786). She was the sibling of Jean-Laurent de Durfort-Civrac duc de Lorges (1746–1826), and the Marquise de Donnissan (1747–1839), mother of the memoirist Victoire de Donnissan, marquise de La Rochejaquelein.

Her mother served as Dame surnuméraire de Mesdames les cadettes (Lady-in-waiting to the princesses Victoire, Sophie & Louise) in 1751–56, dame d'atour from 1756, and from 1775 dame d'honneur to Princess Victoire of France. She was also the personal confidante and favorite of Princess Victoire, who was named godmother to her daughter, and Angélique Victoire was raised and educated at the famous school at Saint-Cyr. In 1773 she married at Saint-Cyr to Henri Georges César, comte de Chastellux. She became the mother of César Laurent, marquis de Chastellux (1780–1854), and two daughters: Louise Pauline de Chastellux (1781–1857), who married Joseph Élisabeth Roger, comte Damas d'Antigny; and Gabrielle Joséphine Simone de Chastellux (1783–1820), spouse of Jean Baptiste Auguste Madeline de Percin, marquis de la Valette Montgaillard.

After her wedding, she was appointed dame pour accompagner to Princess Victoire. After the death of her mother in 1786, she succeeded her as dame d'honneur to Princess Victoire, whilst her husband was named gentleman-in-waiting. With her court appointments she had expected to be created a duchess, and considered resigning her post when she learned otherwise. However, due to the entreaties of Victoire and her elder sister, the Princess Adélaïde, de Chastellux agreed to continue in employ.

In February 1791, after the French Revolution, she belonged to the large retinue that accompanied Victoire and her sister Adelaide from France to Rome. She was accompanied by her spouse and children. During their stay in Rome in 1791–96, the court of the Mesdames were divided in two rival fractions led by the head lady-in-waiting of Madame Victoire, de Chastellux, and her colleague in the court of Madame Adelaide, Françoise de Chalus, who were called the Narbonne fraction and the Chastellux fraction.

She returned to Paris in 1811 where she died, aged 63.

== See also ==
- Durfort family

== Sources ==
- Casimir Stryenski, The Daughters of Louis XV (1912)
- Welvert Eugene, Autour d'une dame d'honneur
