= Parnassus (1769 ship) =

History

Great Britain
- Name: Parnassus
- Namesake: Mount Parnassus
- Builder: Thames
- Launched: 1769
- Fate: Lost at Corsica in late 1796

General characteristics
- Tons burthen: 340, or 348, or 400 (bm)
- Propulsion: Sail
- Complement: 50
- Armament: 1778:16 × 6-pounder guns; 1793:14 × 12&4-pounder guns

Parnassus was launched on the Thames in 1769. She first sailed as a West Indiaman. She twice encountered enemy privateers: the first time she repelled them, but the second time she was captured. A British privateer recaptured her. Parnassus became a whaler in the British northern whale fishery. In 1794 Parnassus was one of the transports at the Battle of Martinique. The troop transport Parnassus was lost at Corsica in late 1796 with heavy loss of life. She was last listed in 1796.

== Career ==
Parnassus first appeared in Lloyd's Register (LR) in the volume for 1768. It showed her master as Thomas Watts, her owners as Drake and Long, and trade London–Jamaica.

A gale on 25 October 1776 caused Captain Carr and Parnassus to separate from their escort, HMS Pallas, which was escorting their convoy from Jamaica. On 28 and 29 October Parnassus encountered three American privateers, each of ten guns. After an engagement of two and a half hours, the privateers sailed off.

Missing issues and missing pages in extant issues mean that Parnassus next appeared in Lloyd's Register in 1778. That issue showed her with Carr, master, Long & Co., owners, and trade London–Jamaica.

In 1782 Parnassus and Carr were less fortunate than in 1776. A French privateer captured Parnassus as she was returning to England from Jamaica. Viper, of Liverpool, recaptured Parnassus and sent her into Liverpool. Viper, of 14 guns, was part of the Newfoundland squadron. She was also described as being of 160 tons (bm), 18 guns, and 80 men. On 30 October a French cartel from Saint-Malo arrived at Plymouth with Carr and several other captains of captured British ships.

Parnassus was still listed in the 1784 LR with Carr, master, and trade London–Jamaica. Parnassus, in the Jamaica trade, Captain Dawson Carr, was offered for sale by the candle in October 1784. She had been copper sheathed in November 1784.

Parnassus was offered for sale by private contract in October 1785.

LR was not published in 1785. "Parnassus" reappeared in the 1787 edition (published in 1786), with H. Clow, master, London ownership, and trade London–Greenland.

On 11 July 1786 LL reported that Parnassus, Clow, master, was at Greenland and so far had taken three whales and 300 seals.

On 10 July 1787 Parnassus was reported as having so far taken two whales. In 1789 she returned to Gravesend on 16 August with three whales.

She was last reported to have taken whales in 1790, though she sought whales in 1792 and 1793. On 23 August 1792, she arrived back at Gravesend from Davis Strait.

Captain Henry Clow acquired a letter of marque on 28 February 1793. On 9 September 1793, he arrived back at Gravesend from Davis Strait.

Parnassus was last listed in LR in 1796 with H. Clow, master, Edwards, owner, and trade London–Davis Strait. However, this was stale data as there is no record that she was still whaling after 1793.

Instead, Parnassus became a government transport. In February 1794, she was reported to be among a large number of transports that had arrived at Barbados.

On 13 February 1794, Parnassus, Captain Osborne, she was one of the three transports that first arrived at Cul-de-sac Cohé off Pointe de Sablons (Pointe des Sables). She then spent the next two weeks landing the artillery and stores for the attack on Fort Bourbon, and bringing bread from the River Lamentin.

== Fate ==
The transport Parnassus was lost at Corsica in late 1796. Lloyd's List reported that the "Pernaffus (transport)" had been lost at Corsica. She had Swiss troops aboard. She struck rocks at Les Moines and sank immediately, taking 278 people with her. Only seven Swiss and four crew members were saved.

At the time Admiral Lord Jervis said:

At any time the loss of such a ship would have been very great, but in the present circumstances of my force, compared with that of the enemy, it is beyond all calculation.
