= Harpooner (1769 ship) =

History

Kingdom of Great Britain
- Name: Harpooner
- Builder: Whitby
- Launched: 1769, or 1773, or 1776
- Fate: Wrecked 10 November 1816

General characteristics
- Tons burthen: 340, or 341, or 370 (bm)
- Length: 104 ft (31.7 m)
- Beam: 27 ft (8.2 m)
- Propulsion: Sail
- Notes: Three masts

Harpooner was launched at Whitby in 1769, or possibly a few years later. Her early career is obscure. She may have been a Greenland whaler between 1786 and 1792. She appeared in Lloyd's Register in 1801, and thereafter traded across the Atlantic. She was wrecked in 1816 with heavy loss of life.

== Career ==
Harpooner first appeared in the Register of Shipping (RS) with Krushaw, master, Richards, owner, and trade Southampton–Baltic. She was of 340 tons burthen and had undergone a good repair in 1799. However, her entry carried the annotation, "Lost".

Apparently Harpooner was not irretrievably lost as she entered Lloyd's Register (LR) in 1801 with Kneeshaw, master, Richeson, owner, and trade London–St Petersburg. She also had undergone a good repair in 1800, and now had a burthen of 370 tons. In 1802 her trade changed to London–Quebec.

Year	Master	Owner	Trade	Source
1803	Kneeshaw	Richeson	London–Quebec	LR; good repair in 1800
1808	J. Hall	Richeson	Cork	LR; good repair in 1800

On 27 June 1810 Harpooner, of Whitby, Davie, master, rescued the crew of William & Agnes. William & Agnes, W. Fernie, master, had foundered in the Atlantic Ocean at 46°36′N 41°00′W while on her way to Quebec. (Note: William & Agnes, of 161 tons (bm), had been launched in 1801 at Anstruther.)

Year	Master	Owner	Trade	Source
1810	J. Hall	Bicheson	Cork	LR; good repair 1800
1815	J. Simpson	Richardson	London transport	LR; almost rebuilt 1811

The 1816 volume of LR showed Harpooner with J. Simpson, master, changing to J. Briant, Richardson, owner, and trade London transport.

== Fate ==
Harpooner, Bryant, master, was wrecked on 10 November 1816 at Cape Pine, Newfoundland, with the loss of 208 of the 385 people on board. She was on a voyage from Quebec City to an English port. Her passengers came from the 76th Regiment of Foot and a detachment from the 4th Veterans Battalion. There were also staff officers, and women and children. (Note: For a fuller account see Allen, though he gives the year as 1818, not 1816.)

The military records of Captain Mathew Henry Willock, of the 103rd Regiment, show that in 1817 he received a medal from His Royal Highness the Duke of Sussex and the Royal Humane Society for saving the lives of troops under lord Howard of Effingham's command on board Harpooner. Willock also received a pension of £100 per annum for life for his actions on Harpooner. (Returns of British Army Officers covering 1790s-1830's (UK National Archives WO-25-789) 21st-25th Regiments of Foot)
