= Tamerlane (1769 ship) =

British whaler and slave ship

History

Great Britain
- Name: Tamerlane
- Namesake: Tamerlane
- Builder: Bermuda
- Launched: 1769
- Captured: 12 August 1794 and burnt

General characteristics
- Tons burthen: 120, or 128, or 150 (bm)
- Notes: Built of Bermuda cedar and mahogany

Tamerlane was launched in 1769 in Bermuda. She first appeared in British records in 1788 and then carried out three voyages as a whaler in the British southern whale fishery. Next, she made one voyage as a slave ship in the triangular trade in enslaved people. French frigates captured and burnt her in 1794.

== Career ==
Tamerlane, Basset, master, arrived at Gravesend from Nova Scotia on 14 September 1788. Tamerlane first appeared in Lloyd's Register (LR) in 1789.

Year	Master	Owner	Trade	Source
1789	W. Simpson	H.Wrde	London-Southern Fishery	LR

Tamerlane made three voyages as a whaler in the Southern Whale Fishery.

1st whaling voyage (1789–1790): Captain William Simpson sailed in 1789 and returned on 17 August 1790. She had sailed to the Africa Grounds and returned from the Brazil Banks.

2nd whaling voyage (1790–1791): Captain Smith sailed in 1790 and returned on 17 August 1791. Tamerlane sought whales off the coasts of Guinea and Patagonia.

3rd whaling voyage (1791–1792): Captain Snell sailed on 11 October 1791, was at Portsmouth on 18 October, and returned to Gravesend on 17 May 1792. Tamerlane had been whaling around the Falkland Islands.

Year	Master	Owner	Trade	Source
1792	John Snell; J.Woodworth	Ward & Co. A.F____	London–South Seas; Liverpool–Dominica	LR
1793	Woodworth; R.White	F_____; Dickson	Liverpool–Dominica	LR

Transporting enslaved people: Tamerlane next made one voyage as a slave ship. Captain Robert White sailed from Liverpool on 17 January 1793, bound for West Africa.

Tamerlane arrived at Kingston, Jamaica on 14 September with 194 captives. At some point Captain Robert Mule replaced White. While Tamerlane was still at sea Gill Slater, one of her two owners, went bankrupt. (The other owner was William Dickson.) Her owners sold Tamerlane after she had delivered her captives.

== Fate ==
On 12 August 1794, a French squadron captured Tamerlane, Richardson, master, on the Newfoundland Banks as she was sailing from Jamaica to London. The French burnt Tamerlane and took her crew to France.

During the period 1793 to 1807, war, rather than maritime hazards or resistance by the captives, was the greatest cause of vessel losses among British enslaving vessels. In 1794, 25 British enslaving vessels were lost; two were lost on the homeward-bound leg of their voyage.
