= Adélaïde of France =

Princess of France (1732–1800)

- Princess of France; Duchess of Louvois
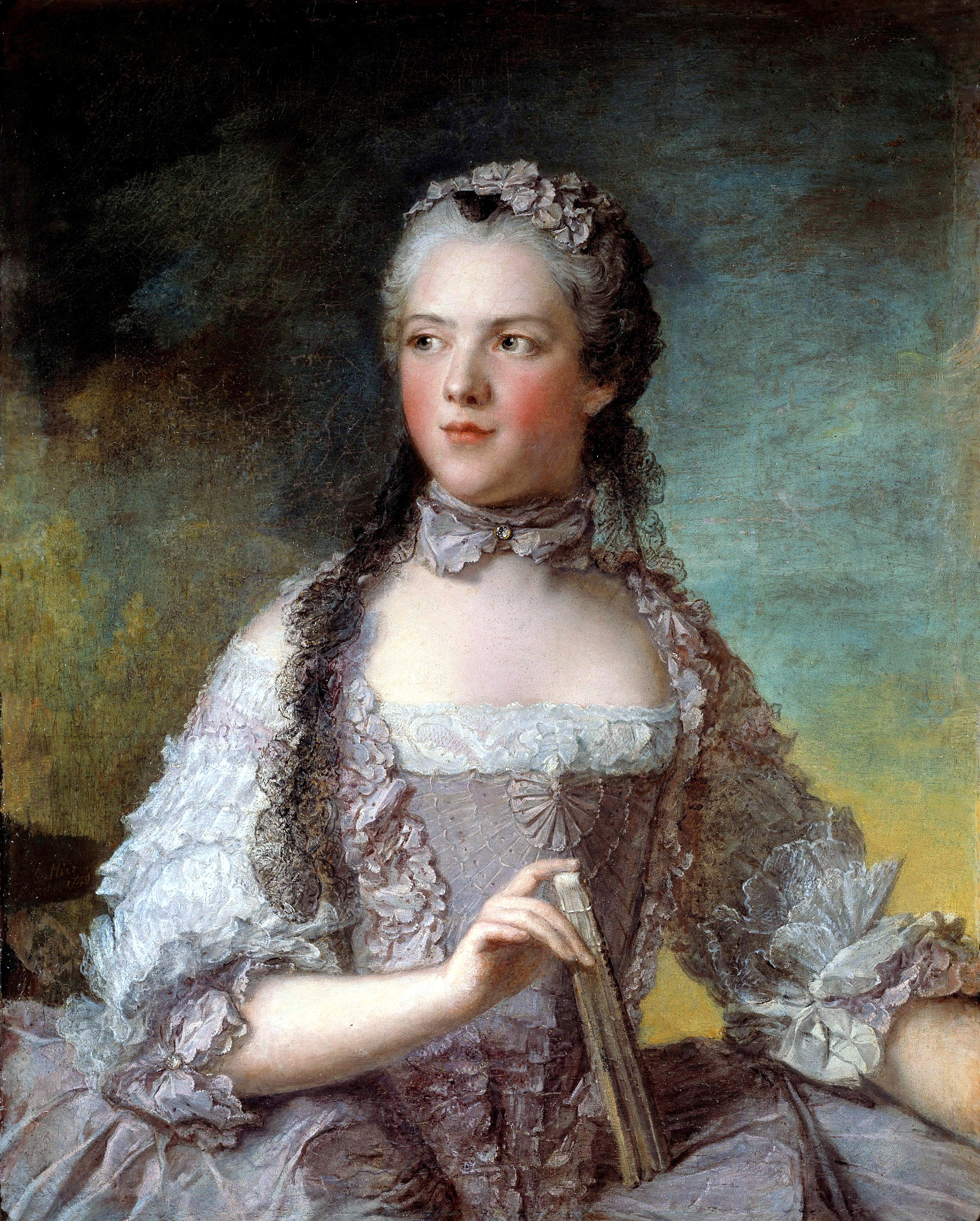
- Portrait by Jean-Marc Nattier, 1749
- Born: 23 March 1732; Palace of Versailles, Versailles, Kingdom of France
- Died: 27 February 1800 (aged 67); Imperial Free City of Trieste, Holy Roman Empire
- Burial: 20 January 1817; Basilica of Saint Denis
- Marie Adélaïde de France
- House: Bourbon
- Father: Louis XV
- Mother: Marie Leszczyńska

Adélaïde de France (Marie Adélaïde; 23 March 1732 - 27 February 1800) was a French princess, the sixth child and fourth daughter of King Louis XV and Queen Marie Leszczyńska.

As a legitimate daughter of the King, Adélaïde was a fille de France. She was referred to as Madame Quatrième ("Madame the Fourth") until the death of her older sister Marie Louise in 1733, and then as Madame Troisième ("Madame the Third"); as Madame Adélaïde from 1737 to 1755; as Madame from 1755 to 1759; and then as Madame Adélaïde again from 1759 until her death. Adélaïde and her sister Sophie possessed the Duchy of Louvois from 1777 until 1792. The duchy had been created for them by their nephew Louis XVI, in their own right. During the reign of her nephew Adélaïde led the extreme conservative faction at court and was strongly anti Marie Antoinette, whom Adélaïde reputedly called 'the Austrian' for the first time. During the French Revolution Adélaïde and her sister, Victoire fled France, settling in Rome. When the French Republic invaded the Italian Peninsula in 1796 the sisters moved to Naples. In 1799 France conquered Naples causing the Mesdames to go to Trieste where the sisters both died, in 1799 and 1800 respectively. She was the last of the children of Louis XV to die.

== Life ==
=== Childhood ===
Adélaïde was born on 23 March 1732 in France as the sixth child and fourth daughter of King Louis XV and his wife, Marie Leszczyńska. She was named after her paternal grandmother, Marie Adélaïde, Dauphine of France, and was raised at the Palace of Versailles with her older sisters, Madame Louise Elisabeth, Madame Henriette, and Madame Marie Louise, along with her brother Louis, Dauphin of France.

Her younger sisters were raised at Fontevraud Abbey from 1738 onward because the cost of raising them in Versailles with all the status to which they were entitled was deemed too expensive by Cardinal Fleury, Louis XV's chief minister. Adélaïde was originally expected to join her younger sisters to Fontevraud. However, she was allowed to stay with her brother and her three elder siblings in Versailles after a personal plea to her father.

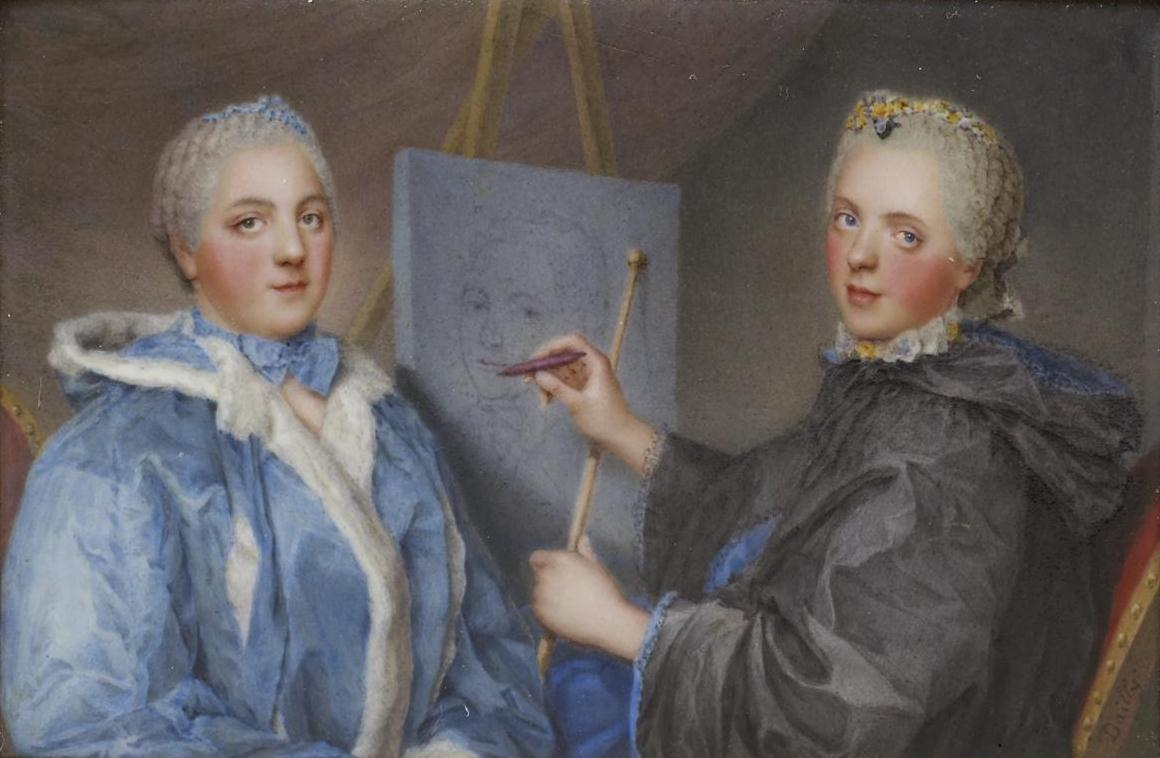
Louise Élisabeth and Adélaïde (1761-1762)

She was put in the care of Marie Isabelle de Rohan, Duchesse of Tallard. According to Madame Campan, "Madame Adelaide, in particular, had a most insatiable desire to learn; she was taught to play upon all instruments, from the horn (will it be believed!) to the Jew's-harp." She studied Italian under Goldoni, and music under Beaumarchais. One of the reasons as to why the expense of her younger sisters at Versailles was regarded as too high, was that the royal children were allowed to participate in court life at a very young age. They were allowed to attend as well as arrange festivities already as children. Adélaïde and her sister Henriette, who never went to Fontevraud, accompanied their father to the opera in Paris at least since 1744 and hunted with him five days a week from the beginning of 1746.

=== Reign of Louis XV ===
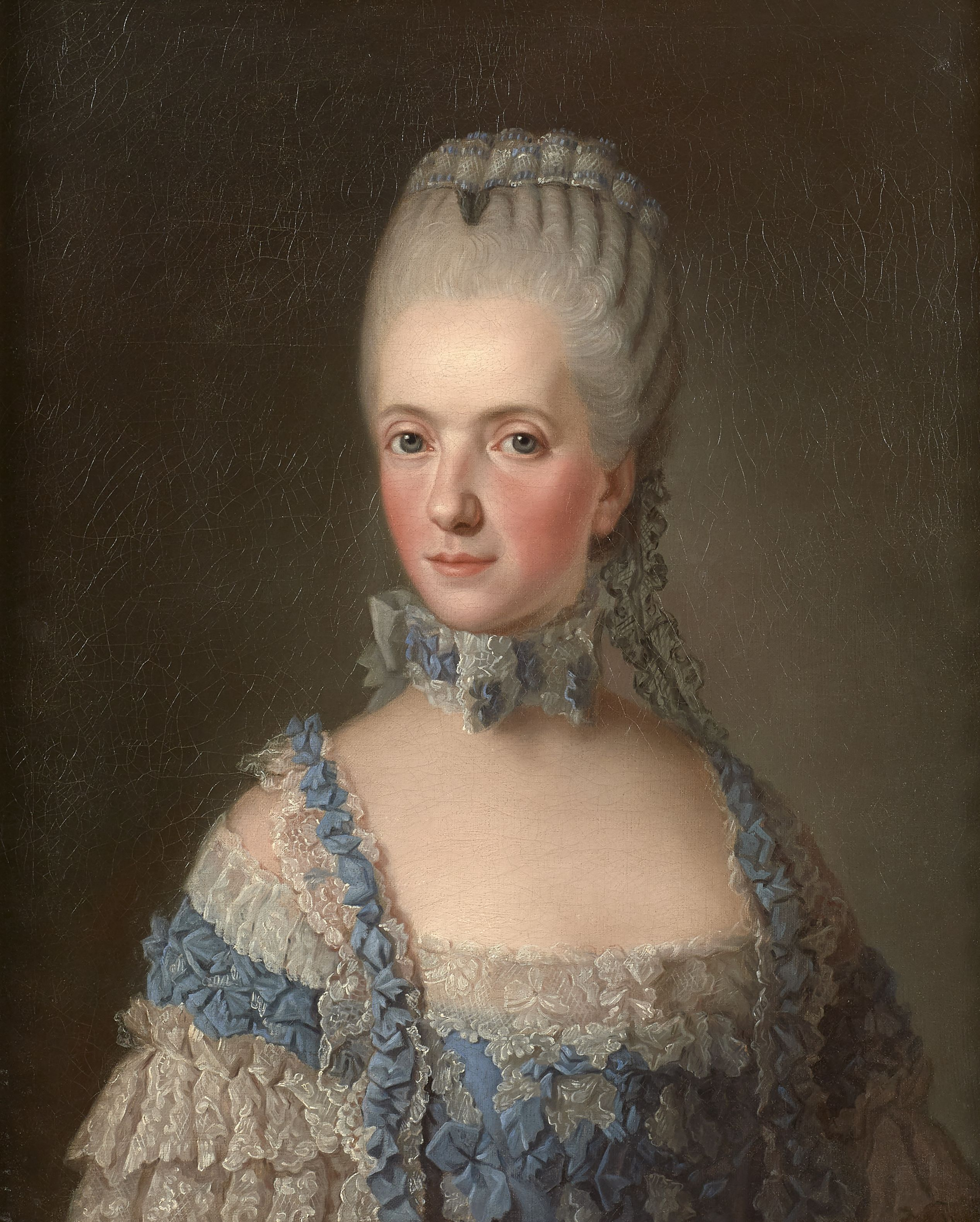
Portrait of Marie-Adélaïde, Joseph Ducreux (1768)

In 1744, the King removed Henriette and Adelaide from the royal nursery into their household, known as the Household of the Mesdames aînées ('Elder Mesdames'). The sisters had two ladies-in-waiting (dame pour accompagner Mesdames). Two years later, they were given their own dame d'honneur, Marie-Angélique-Victoire de Bournonville, Duchesse de Duras. When the younger sisters arrived to court from Fontevrault in 1748–50, they were not inducted in to the Household of their elder sisters but formed the Household of the Mesdames cadettes ('Younger Mesdames'). After the death of Henriette in 1752, the Household of the Mesdames aînées was transformed into the Household of Madame Adélaïde, headed by Marie-Suzanne-Françoise de Creil, Duchesse de Beauvilliers, and she thus held a unique position as the only unmarried royal princess with her own separate household, while her younger sisters shared theirs.

Adélaïde was never married. In the late 1740s, when she had reached the age when princesses were typically married, there were no potential Catholic consorts of desired status available, and she preferred to remain unmarried rather than marry someone below the status of a monarch or an heir to a throne. Marriage prospects suggested to her were liaisons with Louis François, Prince of Conti and Prince Francis Xavier of Saxony, neither of whom had the status of being a monarch or an heir to a throne. In her teens, Adélaïde fell in love with a member of the Lifeguard after having observed him perform his duties; she sent him her snuffbox with the message, "You will treasure this, soon you shall be informed from whose hand it comes." The guardsman informed his captain the Duke of Ayen, who in turn informed the King, who recognized the handwriting as his daughter's, and granted the guard an annual pension of four thousand under the express condition that he should "at once remove to some place far from the Court and remain there for a very long time". In 1761, long after she passed the age when 18th-century princesses usually wed, she was reportedly suggested to marry the newly widowed Charles III of Spain. However, after she had seen his portrait, she refused, a rejection which was said to be the reason why Charles III never remarried.

When her younger sisters arrived back from Fontevraud in 1748–50, she became the head of the group of the four unmarried, younger sisters; the others were Madame Victoire, Madame Sophie, and Madame Louise. The King referred to them by nicknames: he called Madame Adélaïde ‘Loque’ (Tatters/Rag/Rags/Scraggy), Madame Victoire ‘Coche’ (Pig/Piggy/Sow), Madame Sophie, ‘Graille’ (Grub/Scrap/Carrion crow), and Madame Louise, ‘Chiffe’ (Shoddy silk/Rags).

Like their mother, the well loved Queen Marie Leszczyńska, Adélaïde and her siblings were actually very charitable as noted by Charles Philippe d'Albert, 4th Duke of Luynes in his memoirs and often gave money using their allowances in supporting workhouses for the poor as well as given alms to regions struck by calamity. She is described as an intelligent beauty; her appearance an ephemeral, "striking and disturbing beauty of the Bourbon type characterized by elegance", with "large dark eyes at once passionate and soft", and her personality as extremely haughty to her father's debauched circle of friends but was actually friendly towards the common people of France during public ceremonies in Paris as described by the Duke of Luynes, with a dominant and ambitious character with a strong will, who came to dominate her younger siblings: "Madame Adélaïde had more mind than Madame Victoire; but she was altogether deficient in that kindness which alone creates affection for the great, abrupt manners, a harsh voice, and a short way of speaking, rendering her more than imposing. She carried the idea of the prerogative of rank to a high pitch." A childhood anecdote mentions how she, at the age of eleven, expressed her desire to defeat the English by the method described in Judith And Holofernes in the Bible. She was the only one of the unmarried sisters with political ambition, and she attempted unsuccessfully to gain political influence through her father the king, her brother the Dauphin, and eventually through her nephew, the next Dauphin.

Madame Adélaïde, as well as her siblings, attempted without success to prevent their father's liaison with Madame de Pompadour, which began in 1745. In the early 1750s, when the health of Madame de Pompadour was deteriorating, Adélaïde, who was a good rider, became the favorite and close companion of her father, during which she often accompanied him during his riding and amused him with conversation. Their new close relationship, and Adelaïde's status as the most beautiful among her sisters, caused rumors that they had an incestuous relationship. A rumor also claimed that Adélaïde was the true mother of Louis de Narbonne (born 1755) by her father. There is nothing to indicate that these rumors were true but was rather a very hurtful way in undermining her status as a loving daughter to her father.

Between the death of Madame de Pompadour in 1764 and before the rise of Madame du Barry in 1768, Louis XV did have a certain confidence in Madame Adélaïde, and was supported by her "firm and rapid resolutions." It was thought that through her, the King was advised by the Archbishop of Paris, Christophe de Beaumont, and the Dévots. During these years, the King did not take another official royal mistress. After the death of their mother Queen Marie Leszczyńska in 1768, the King wept and was deeply sad and depressed as he had never stopped loving his wife in spite of his numerous mistresses. Members of the court believed that as soon as the King recovered from his depression, the choice would be between either providing him with a new queen, or a new official royal mistress. Madame Adélaïde, who detested the idea of a new royal mistress, encouraged the solution of her father marrying again to prevent it. She reportedly preferred a queen who was young, beautiful and lacked ambition, as she could distract her father from state affairs, leaving them to Madame Adélaïde herself. She supported the Dowager Princesse de Lamballe as a suitable candidate for that purpose and was supported in this plan by the powerful Noailles family. However, the Princesse de Lamballe was not willing to encourage the match herself, her former father-in-law, Louis Jean Marie de Bourbon, Duke of Penthièvre, was not willing to consent, and the marriage plan never materialized. The King was then suggested to marry Archduchess Maria Elisabeth of Austria. The Archduchess was a famed beauty, but when she suffered from smallpox, which badly scarred her face, marriage negotiations were discontinued. Instead, Louis XV introduced his last official maîtresse-en-titre, Madame du Barry, to court in 1769, whom Madame Adélaïde came to despise.

In the last years of their father's reign, Adélaïde and her sisters were described as bitter old hags, who spent their days gossiping and knitting in their rooms. Reportedly, they seldom dressed properly, merely putting on panniers covered by a coat when leaving their rooms. Madame Campan described the sisters and their life in the years around 1770: "Louis XV saw very little of his family. He came every morning by a private staircase into the apartment of Madame Adélaïde. He often brought and drank the coffee that he had made himself. Madame Adélaïde pulled a bell which apprised Madame Victoire of the King's visit; Madame Victoire, on rising to go to her sister's apartment, rang for Madame Sophie, who in her turn rang for Madame Louise. The apartments of Mesdames were immense. Madame Louise occupied the farthest room. This latter lady was deformed and very short; the poor Princess used to run with all her might to join the daily meeting, but, having many rooms to cross, she frequently, despite her haste, had only just time to embrace her father before he set out for the chase. Every evening, at six, Mesdames interrupted my reading to them to accompany the princes to Louis XV.; this visit was called the King's ‘debotter’,—[Debotter, meaning the time of unbooting.]—and was marked by a kind of etiquette. Mesdames put on an enormous hoop, which set out a petticoat ornamented with gold or embroidery; they fastened a long train round their waists, and concealed the undress of the rest of their clothing by a long cloak of black taffety which enveloped them up to the chin. The chevaliers d’honneur, the ladies in waiting, the pages, the equerries, and the ushers bearing large flambeaux, accompanied them to the King. In a moment the whole palace, generally so still, was in motion; the King kissed each Princess on the forehead, and the visit was so short that the reading which it interrupted was frequently resumed at the end of a quarter of an hour; Mesdames returned to their apartments, and untied the strings of their petticoats and trains; they resumed their tapestry, and I my book."

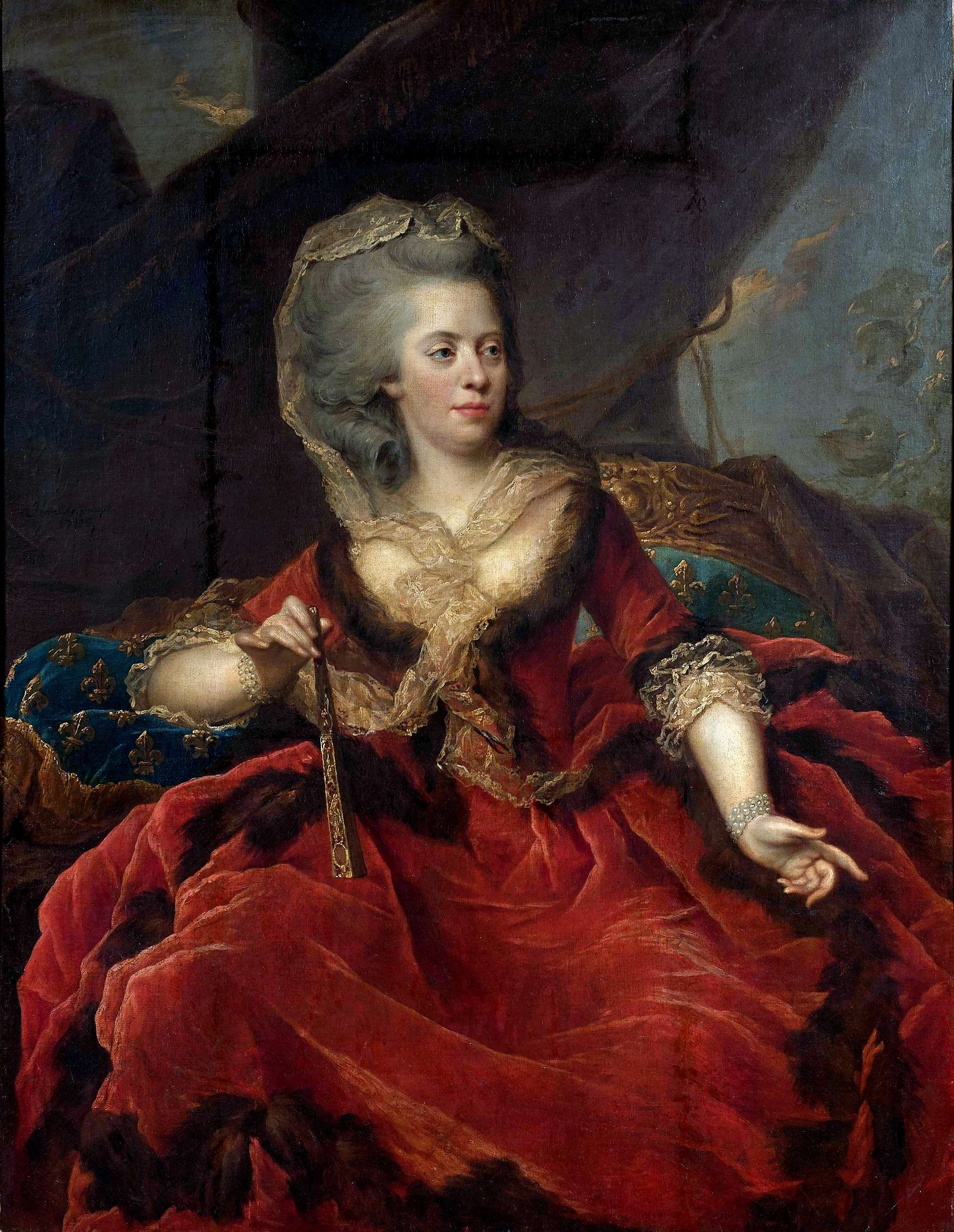
Madame Adélaïde by Heinsius, 1784

The Mesdames had a good relationship with the children of their brother, and it was said that they "proved that piety is not incompatible with intellectual charm." In 1770, the fourteen-year-old Marie Antoinette became Dauphine by marriage to Madame Adélaïde's nephew the Dauphin, the future Louis XVI. This marriage had been declared by Étienne François de Choiseul, Duke of Choiseul, advisory of the Dévot party and therefore of the Mesdames, and Adélaïde declared that if she had any say, she would not have sent for an Austrian. Because of the close relationship between the Dauphin and his aunts, Marie Antoinette also initially came close to the Mesdames her first years in France as the senior royal women at court. The Mesdames used to alternate with the Countess of Provence in accompanying Marie Antoinette on official assignments. Madame Adélaïde tried to win the Dauphine's support against Madame du Barry and repeatedly enticed the Dauphine to snub Madame du Barry. Being the first lady of the court, Madame du Barry could not speak to the Dauphine without being spoken to by her first and, encouraged by Madame Adélaïde, Marie Antoinette refused to do so.

In 1772, this state of affairs created a serious rift in the relationship between the King and Marie Antoinette, and Empress Maria Theresa and her ambassador, Florimond Claude, Comte de Mercy-Argenteau, concerned by the political consequences if this rift were to lead to a conflict between France and Austria, forced the Dauphine to agree to speak to Madame du Barry. The first time Marie Antoinette attempted to do so, however, she was interrupted by Madame Adélaïde, requiring a second attempt before the Dauphine managed to speak to Madame du Barry, avoiding a rift in the Franco-Austrian alliance and thus thwarting the plot of Madame Adélaïde. This discontinued the friendship between Marie Antoinette and Madame Adélaïde, who would bear subsequent malice toward Marie Antoinette and was reportedly the first person to call her "the Austrian."

=== Reign of Louis XVI ===
From April 1774, Madame Adélaïde and her sisters attended to their father Louis XV on his deathbed until his death from smallpox on 10 May. Despite the fact that the sisters never had the disease and the male members of the royal family, as well as the Dauphine, were kept away because of the high risk of catching the illness, the Mesdames were allowed to attend to him until his death, being female and therefore of no political importance because of the Salic law even if they died. After the death of Louis XV, he was succeeded by his grandson Louis-Auguste as Louis XVI, who referred to his aunts as Mesdames Tantes.

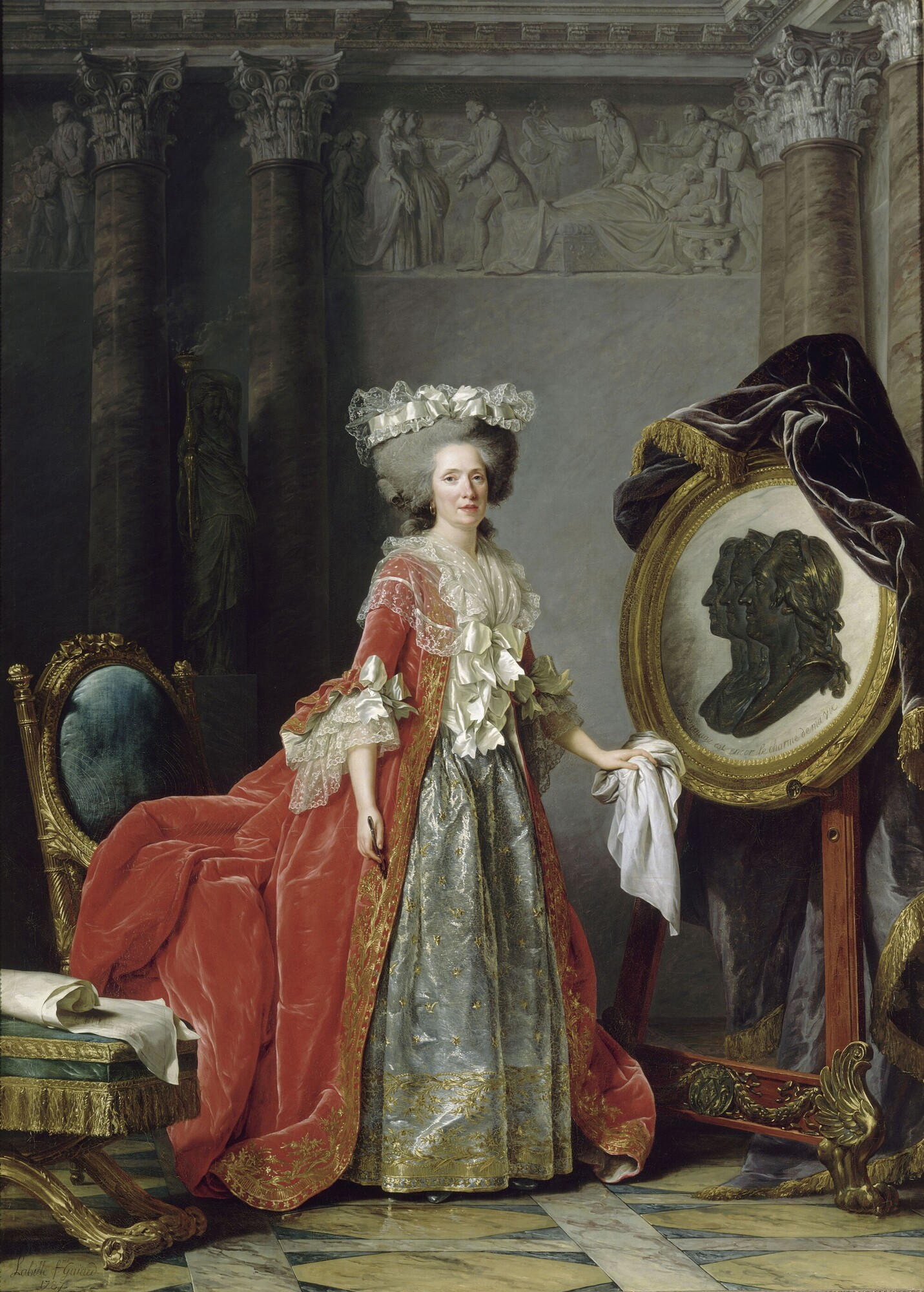
Portrait of Marie Adélaïde

Madame Adélaïde came to play a political role after the succession of her nephew. The sisters had in fact been infected by their father and fell ill with smallpox (from which they recovered), and were kept in quarantine on a little house near the Palace of Choisy, to which the court evacuated after the death of the king until their recovery. Despite this, however, Madame Adélaïde had the time to intervene in the establishment of the new government: Louis XVI had been advised by his father to ask the advice of Adélaïde should he become king, and after his succession, he sent her a letter and asked her advice on whom he should entrust his kingdom, and she replied with a list of names of minister candidates to him suggested by his father.

After her brother the Dauphin's death in 1765, followed in 1767 by that of his spouse, Marie-Josèphe, Madame Adélaïde took custody of the late dauphine's papers, with instructions concerning suitable ministers for their son, Louis-Auguste, should he become king, and these papers were duly sent to Louis XVI, and opened on 12 May 1774. Three names were suggested for the position of Chief minister; that of Jean-Frédéric Phélypeaux, comte de Maurepas, Emmanuel-Armand de Richelieu, duc d'Aiguillon, and Jean-Baptiste de Machault d'Arnouville. Madame Adélaïde thus played an important role in the forming of the new government, and the recovery of her and her sisters from smallpox in late May was regretted by the friends of the ex-ministers, Madame du Deffand commenting: "The avenging angel has shielded his sword. We shall again see the three spinsters at the new court, where they will continue their small minded plots."

At the beginning of his reign, the confidence Louis XVI felt for Madame Adélaïde sometime extended to state affairs, and he thought her intelligent enough to make her his political adviser and allowed her to make appointments to the Treasury and to draw on its funds. She was supported by her followers, Louis Philippe I, Duke of Orléans, Emmanuel Armand de Vignerot du Plessis, Duke of Aiguillon, Anne de Noailles and Madame de Marsan; however, her political activity was opposed to such a degree within the court that the King soon saw himself obliged to exclude her from state affairs.

Their nephew the King allowed the sisters to keep their apartments in the Palace of Versailles, and they kept attending court at special occasions - such as for example at the visit of Joseph II, Holy Roman Emperor, who reportedly charmed Adélaïde. In 1777, Madame Adélaïde and her sister Sophie were both created the duchesses of Louvois in their own right by their nephew the King. However, they distanced themselves from court and often preferred to reside in their own Château de Bellevue in Meudon; they also traveled annually to Vichy, always with a retinue of at least three hundred people, and made the waters there fashionable. The Mesdames continued to be the confidants of Louis XVI, and they also maintained a good relationship with their niece, Princess Élisabeth of France, and often visited her in her retreat at Montreuil. When Victoire de Rohan resigned as Governess of the Children of France, the King, who maintained a good relationship with his aunts, wished to give Madame Adélaïde the responsibility for the upbringing of his children, as she shared his views on religion, but this was rebuked by the Queen, who stated that she could not bear to give the position to someone who had made her first years in France so difficult.

The Mesdames did not get along well with Queen Marie Antoinette. When the Queen introduced the new custom of informal evening family suppers, as well as other habits which undermined the formal court etiquette, it resulted in an exodus of the old court nobility in opposition to the Queen's reforms, which gathered in the salon of the Mesdames. They entertained extensively at Bellevue as well as Versailles; their salon was reportedly regularly frequented by minister Maurepas, whom Adélaïde had elevated to power, by the Prince of Condé and the Prince of Conti, both members of the anti-Austrian party, as well as Pierre Beaumarchais, who read aloud his satires of Austria and its power figures. The Austrian Ambassador Mercy reported that their salon was a center of intrigues against Marie Antoinette, where the Mesdames tolerated poems satirizing the queen. The Mesdames gathered the extreme conservative Dévots party of the nobility opposed to the Philosophes, the Encyclopédistes and the economists. When Marie Antoinette, referring to the rising opposition of the monarchy, remarked to Adélaïde of the behavior of the "shocking French people", Adelaide replied, "I think you mean shocked", insinuating that Marie Antoinette's behavior was shocking.

In May 1787 she was visited by Henry Swinburne, who described her and their meeting: "To Bellevue with Mrs S., were Madame Adélaïde received us, and was extremely civil. We dined there. The Princess is thin and wizened; she walks about the gardens in a dress made like a riding-habit, and a man's round hat."

Madame Adélaïde, reportedly, did not regard the convocation of the Estates General of 1789 as a prelude to a revolution, only as a grand state occasion.

=== Revolution and later life ===
Madame Adélaïde and her sister Victoire were present at Versailles during the Parisian Women's March on Versailles on 6 October 1789, and belonged to those gathered in the King's apartment the night of the attack on Marie Antoinette's bedroom. They participated in the wagon train leaving the Palace of Versailles for Paris; however, their carriage separated from the rest of the procession on the way before they reached Paris, and they never took up residence at the Tuileries Palace with the royal family, but preferred to retire to the Château de Bellevue in Meudon.

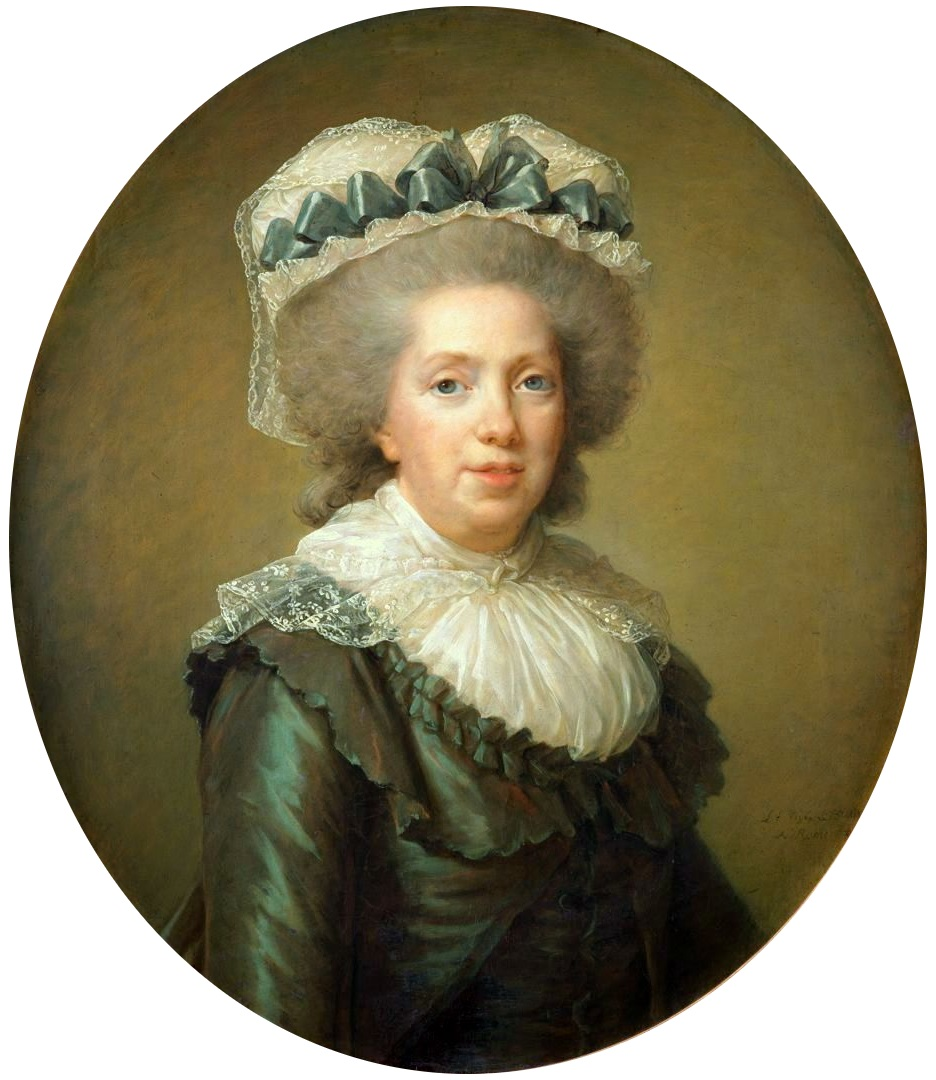
Madame Adélaïde of France, by Élisabeth Louise Vigée Le Brun (1791)

Revolutionary laws against the Catholic Church caused them to apply for passports from their nephew the King to travel on pilgrimage to the Basilica of Saint Peter in Rome, and Louis XVI signed their passports and notified the Cardinal de Bernis, the French Ambassador to Rome, of their arrival. On 3 February 1791, when they were about to leave, anonymous intimation of their intention was sent to the Jacobin Club, which caused a deputation of protest to the National Constituent Assembly. On 19 February, a crowd of women assembled at the Palais-Royal and agreed to march out to Château de Bellevue and stop the Mesdames from departing. The Mesdames were warned and left the château in the carriage of a visitor before having the time to bring their baggage wagons, which were, however, protected and sent after them by General Louis-Alexandre Berthier. They left for Italy in a procession of wagons on 20 February 1791 with a large entourage.

Their departure was given attention in the press. The Chroniqle de Paris wrote: "Two Princesses, sedentary by condition, age, and taste, are suddenly possessed by a mania for travelling and running about the world. That is singular, but possible. They are going, so people say, to kiss the Pope's slipper. That is droll, but edifying. [...] The Ladies, and especially Madame Adélaïde, want to exercise the rights of man. That is natural. [...] "The fair travellers are followed by a train of eighty persons. That is fine. But they carry away twelve millions. That is very ugly. [...]", while the Sahhats Jacobites wrote: " The Ladies are going to Italy to try the power of their tears and their charms upon the princes of that country. Already the Grand Master of Malta has caused Madame Adélaïde to be informed that he will give her his heart and hand as soon as she has quitted France, and that she may count upon the assistance of three galleys and forty-eight cavaliers, young and old. Our Holy Father undertakes to marry Victoire and promises her his army of three hundred men to bring about a counter-revolution."

They were temporarily stopped by a riot against their departure in Moret, and on 21 February, they were detained for several days at a tavern in Arnay-le-Duc, where the municipality wished to affirm their permission to leave from the National Assembly before allowing them to continue. In Paris, the affair caused riots, and protesters invaded the Tuileries Garden and demanded the King order his aunts to return. The matter was debated in the National Assembly, where Louis, comte de Narbonne-Lara acted as their spokesperson. Honoré Gabriel Riqueti, comte de Mirabeau convinced the National Assembly that "The welfare of the people cannot depend on the journey the Ladies undertake to Rome; while they are promenading near the places where the Capitol once stood, nothing prevents the edifice of our liberty from rising to its utmost height. [...] Europe will doubtless be much astonished, when it learns that the National Assembly of France spent four entire hours in deliberating on the departure of two ladies who would rather hear Mass in Rome - than in Paris." The public at Arnay-le-Duc were however not pleased with the decision of the Assembly, and because of a riot to prevent their departure, they were not able to leave until 3 March. They were exposed to public demonstrations in several occasions between Lyon and the border before they finally left France on the bridge of Beauvoisin, where they were hooted from the French shore, while salvos of artillery from the Italian shore welcomed them to Piedmont, where they were welcomed by a royal guard of escort and the chief palace officials of King Victor Amadeus III of Sardinia, who installed them in the Château de Chambery. They continued to visit their niece Clotilde at the royal court of Turin, but stayed only a fortnight: "not even the touching and gracious welcome offered to them by the royal family, the affection shown to them by the Count of Artois and the Prince and Princess of Piedmont, their nephew and niece, could make them forget the anguish and perils they had left behind them, and which encircled their family and country with gloom. Mme Victoire wept continuously, Mme Adélaïde did not cry, but she had almost lost the use of speech."

They arrived in Rome on 16 April 1791, where Pope Pius VI gave them an official welcome with ringing of bells, and where they stayed for about five years. In Rome, the sisters were given the protection of the Pope and housed in the palace of Cardinal de Bernis. In the Friday receptions of Cardinal de Bernis, Cornelia Knight described them: "Madame Adélaïde still retained traces of that beauty which had distinguished her in her youth, and there was great vivacity in her manner, and in the expression of her countenance. Madame Victoire had also an agreeable face, much good sense, and great sweetness of temper. Their dress, and that of their suite, were old-fashioned, but unostentatious. The jewels they brought with them had been sold, one by one, to afford assistance to the poor emigrées who applied to the princesses in their distress. They were highly respected by the Romans; not only by the higher orders, but by the common people, who had a horror of the French revolution, and no great partiality for that nation in general."

When news came that Louis XVI and his family had left Paris on the Flight to Varennes in June, a misunderstanding first caused the impression that the escape had succeeded; at this news, "the whole of Rome shouted with joy; the crowd massed itself under the windows of the princesses crying out: Long live the King!", and the Mesdames arranged a grand banquet for the nobility of Rome in celebration, which had to be interrupted when it was clarified that the escape had in fact failed.

Upon the invasion of Italy by Revolutionary France in 1796, Adélaïde and Victoire left Rome for Naples, where Marie Antoinette's sister, Maria Carolina, was queen, and settled at the Neapolitan royal court in the Palace of Caserta. Queen Maria Carolina found their presence in Naples difficult: "I have the awful torment of harboring the two old Princesses of France with eighty persons in their retinue and every conceivable impertinence... The same ceremonies are observed in the interior of their apartments here as were formerly at Versailles." When Naples was invaded by France in 1799, they left in a Russian frigate for Corfu, and finally settled in Trieste, where Victoire died of breast cancer. Adélaïde died one year later, on 27 February 1800 at the age of sixty-seven. Their bodies were returned to France by Louis XVIII at the time of the Bourbon Restoration and buried at the Basilica of Saint-Denis.

== Gallery ==
Selected works

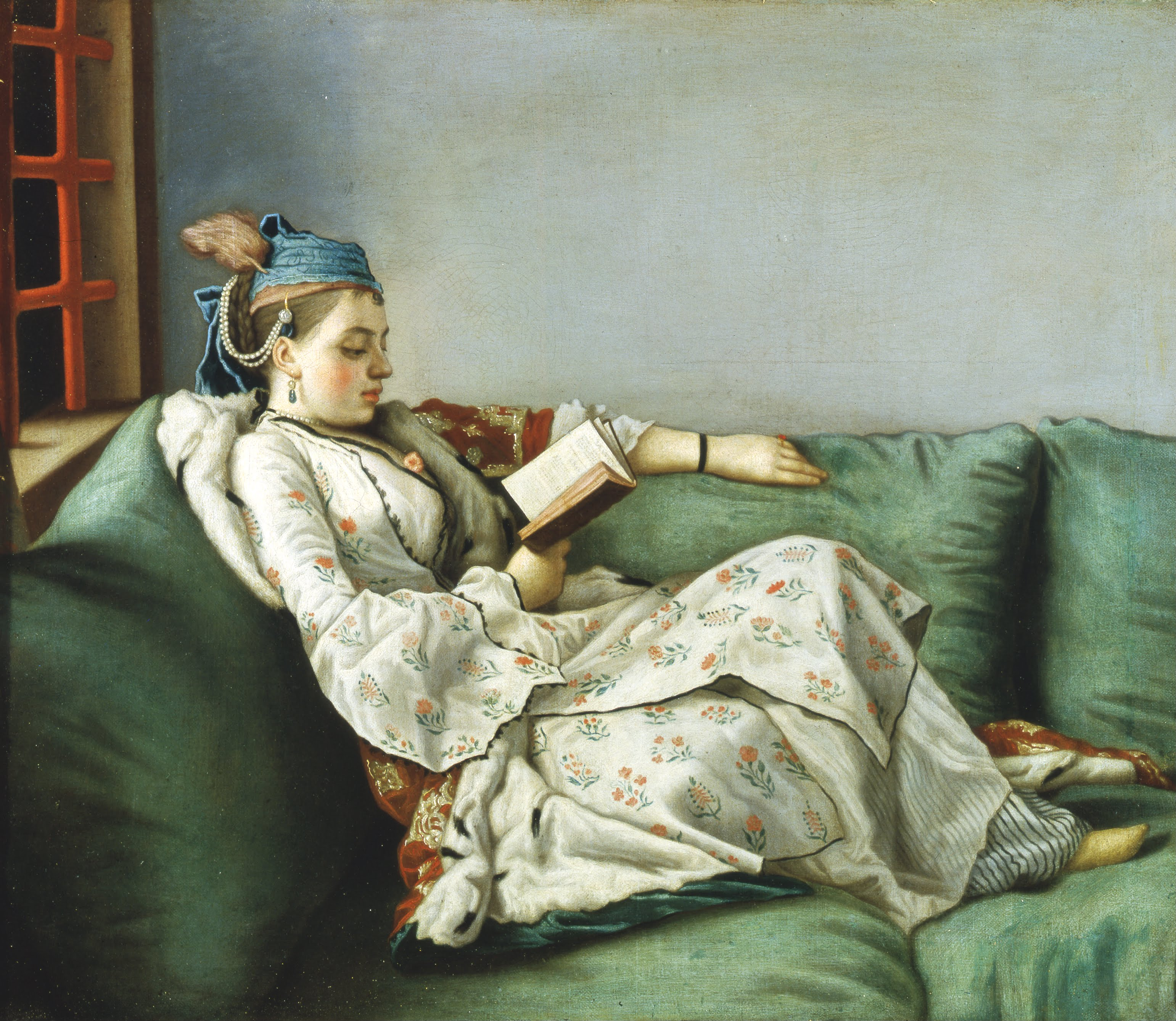
Madame Adélaïde in Turkish dress, Liotard (1753)

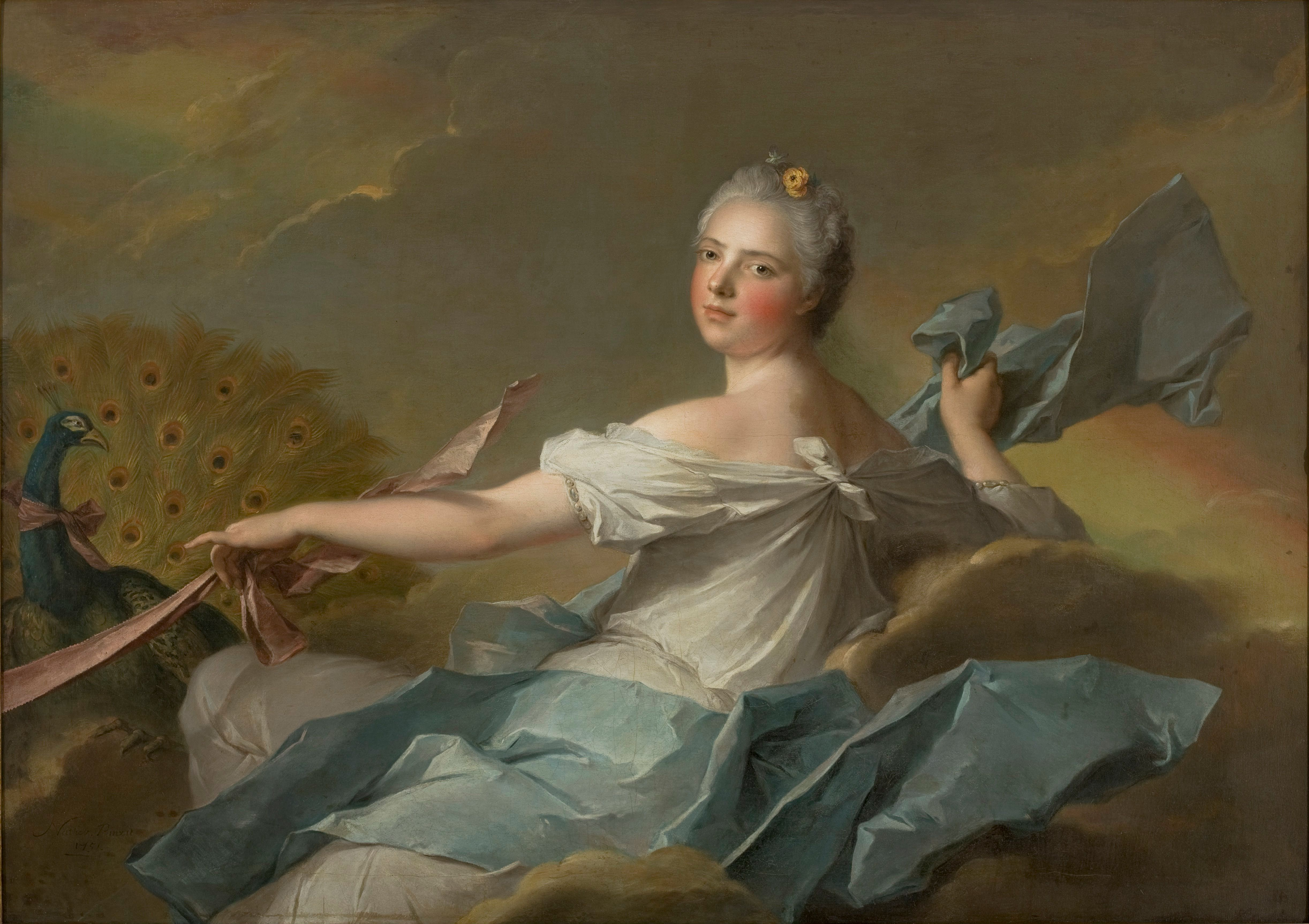
Madame Adélaïde as 'air', Jean-Marc Nattier (1750-1)

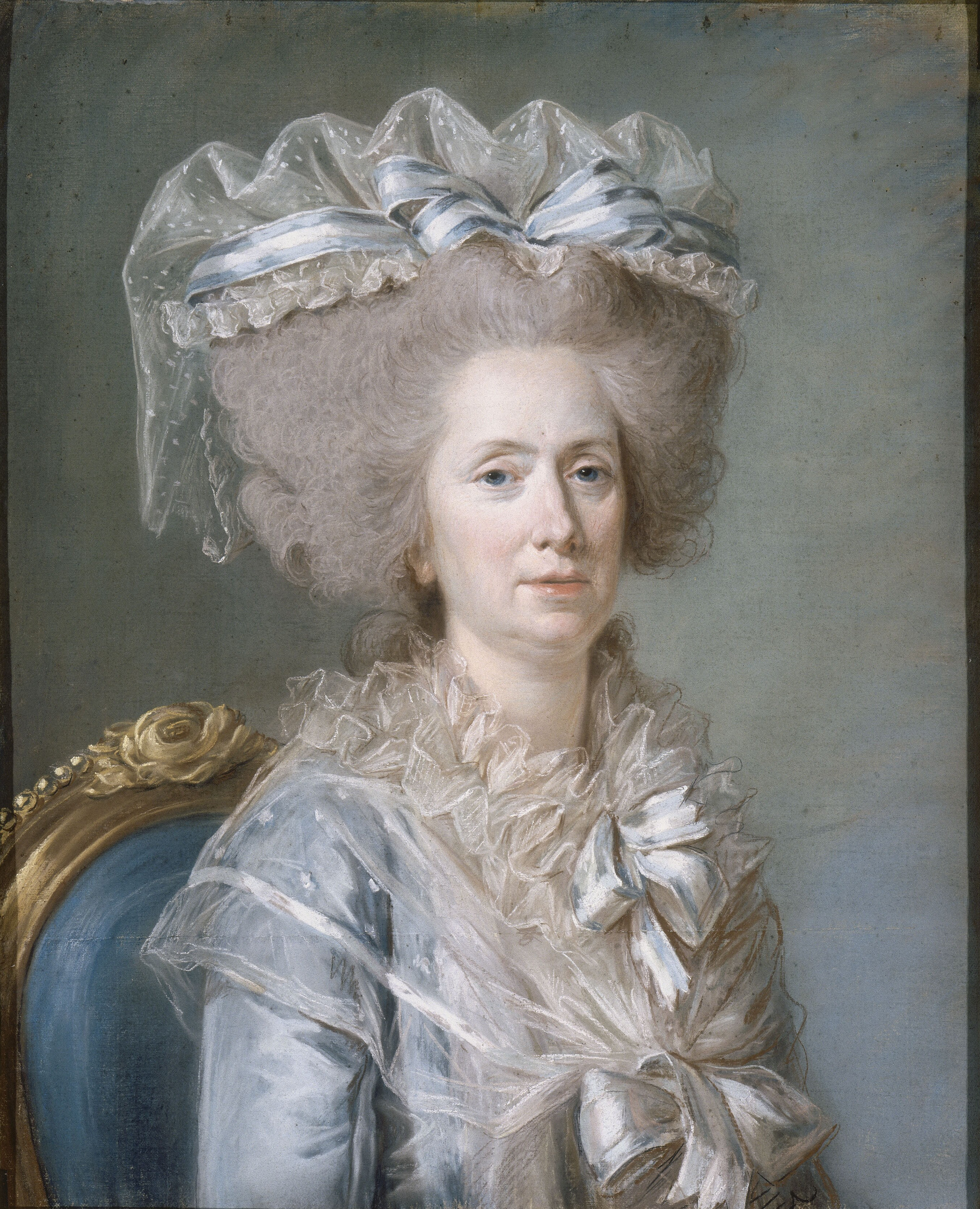
Madame Adélaïde in late life, Adélaïde Labille-Guiard (1786-1787)

== Ancestry ==
Ancestors of Marie Adélaïde of France

8. Louis, Dauphin of France
4. Louis, Duke of Burgundy
9. Maria Anna Victoria of Bavaria
2. Louis XV of France
10. Victor Amadeus II of Sardinia
5. Marie Adélaïde of Savoy
11. Anne Marie of Orléans
1. Marie Adélaïde of France
12. Rafał Leszczyński
6. Stanisław I Leszczyński
13. Anna Jabłonowska
3. Marie Leszczyńska
14. Jan Karol Opaliński
7. Katarzyna Opalińska
15. Zofia Czarnkowska

== See also ==
- Mesdames de France
