= Sophie of France (disambiguation) =

Sophie of France may refer to:

- Sophie of France (1734–1782), the eighth child of Louis XV of France and Marie Leszczyńska
- Sophie of France (1776-1783), a member of the House of Bourbon
- Sophie of France (1786-1787), the second daughter of Louis XVI of France and Marie Antoinette
