= Ingeltrude =

Ingeltrude, Ingeltrud or Engeltrude is a feminine name of Germanic origin. Historically, it may refer to:

- Ingeltrude (fl. 590), abbess of Beaumont-lès-Tours
- Ingeltrude, wife of King Pepin I of Aquitaine (died 838)
- Ingeltrude (fl. 860s), wife of Count Boso the Elder
- Ingeltrude (837 or 840–870), daughter of Duke Eberhard of Friuli and possibly the wife of Henry, Margrave of the Franks
