= Marie de Beauvilliers =

French abbes of the Catholic church (1574–1667)

Marie Catherine de Beauvilliers
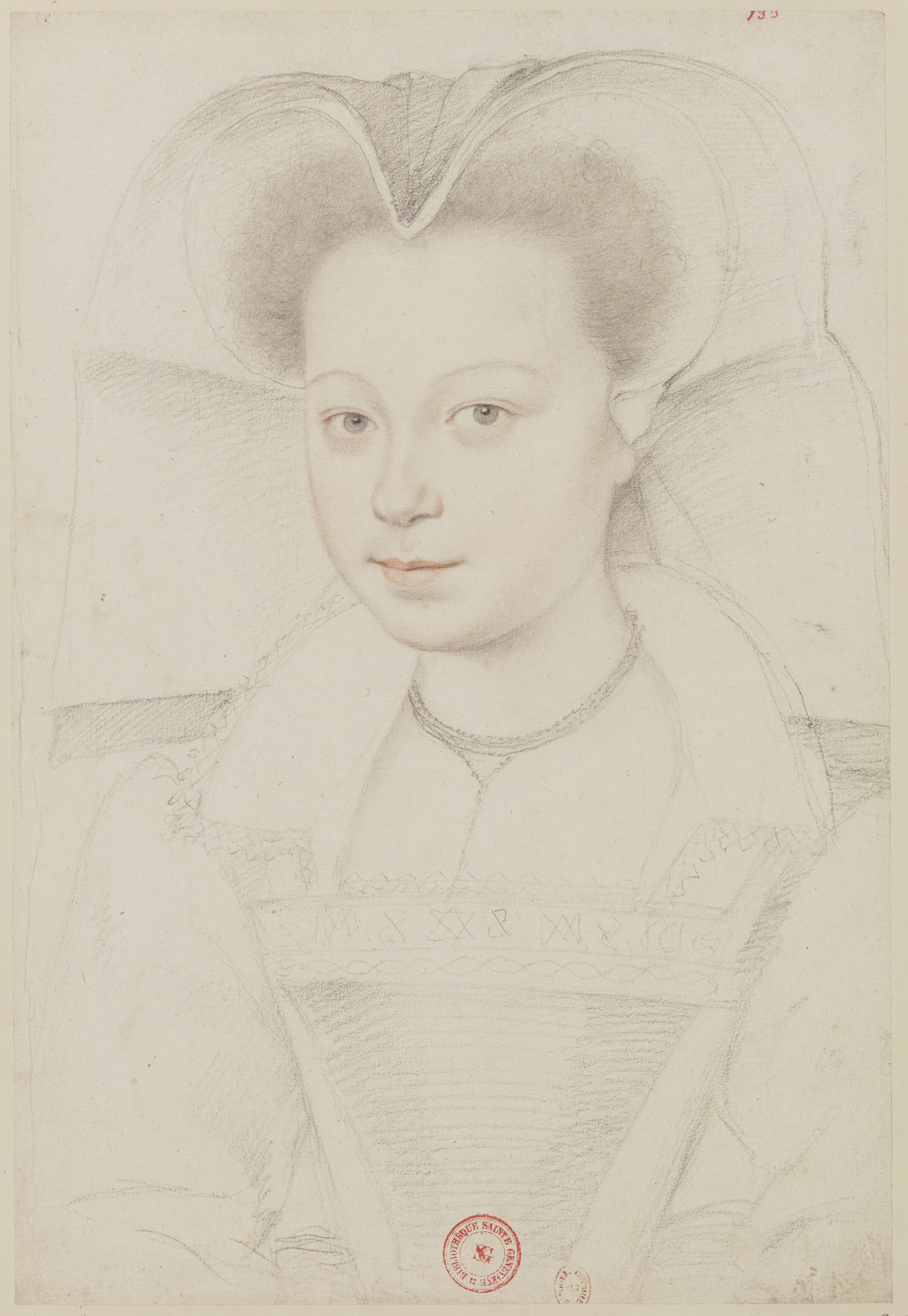
- Marie de Beauvilliers by François Quesnel, 1585
- Born: 15 April 1574; Chantenay-Saint-Imbert, France
- Died: 21 April 1667 (aged 93); Paris, France
- Occupations: Abbess; King's mistress

Marie-Catherine de Beauvilliers (25 April 1574 – 1667) was a French abbess.

When she was 24 she entered the convent-abbey of Montmartre in Paris, installed as abbess in succession to her sister, some three years later, in 1601. As a young woman she became one of the many mistresses of King Henry IV, when he lodged at the abbey while laying siege to Paris in 1590. It is nevertheless Marie-Catherine who is credited with having subsequently restored the abbey to moral and physical good order.

== Life ==
Marie-Catherine de Beauvilliers was born at the Château of La Ferté Imbert at Chantenay-Saint-Imbert, roughly 240 km (150 miles) to the south of Paris. She was the daughter of Claude de Beauvilliers, the Count of Saint-Aignan and of Marie Babou de la Bourdaisière. The family was well connected.

At the age of 7 Marie-Catherine joined the Abbey of Peray to the west. When the abbess died she was returned to her home region and placed under the tutelage of an uncle, her parents having by now died. Then in 1582, she joined the monastery at Beaumont where the abbess, Anne Babou de la Bourdaisière, was her aunt. In 1586, now aged 12, she was baptised by her uncle, the future Cardinal de la Bourdaisière. She took her own religious vows four years later, becoming a nun at Montmartre Abbey in Paris on 11 June 1590.

It was at about this time, aged 16, that she became a mistress of King Henry IV. The king, accompanied by an army of approximately 12,000 men, was undertaking a siege of Paris in the context of the religious wars of the time. He mounted two artillery guns on the abbey and took it over as army accommodation. Most of the nuns fled into the city in order to avoid the carnal attentions of the soldiers, but some of the youngest of them were left behind. The king and the young nun fell in love, their relationship becoming the subject of much comment among the soldiers and the Paris citizenry, while Montmartre Abbey acquired the popular soubriquet, "magasin des putains de l'armée" (loosely: "The army shop of whores"). The lovers became inseparable and when the king moved on to Senlis, Marie-Catherine agreed to leave the abbey in order to accompany him. She was received with great fanfare in Senlis, but the affair quickly ran its course and she was supplanted in the king's affections by Gabrielle d'Estrées. The two women were cousins: their mothers had been sisters. Marie-Catherine remained in Senlis for a few months after the end of the affair and then, displaying some courage, returned to Montmartre.

The king did not entirely forget her, however, and installed her as the abbess at Montmartre in 1598 or 1601. The appointment enjoyed the powerful support of Benoît of Canfield, Cardinal de Sourdis and Francis de Sales. Sources differ as to when she became abbess, but she retained the position for a remarkably long time, retiring from it only in 1657, probably on account of her extreme old age. The death in 1613 of Abbess Anne Babou led to Marie-Catherine's appointment as abbess of Beaumont, apparently concurrently with her position at Montmartre, but she held the Beaumont appointment only for two years.

There was considerable resistance within the abbey, but the new abbess persisted and over the year good order was restored. As she grew older she became more pious and austere personally, and more effective as a leader in imposing obedience on the sisters. It was only in 1657 that she retired. She lived on for another decade, however, dying on 21 April 1667 in Paris, just four days short of her ninety-third birthday.
