= Marie Alvequin =

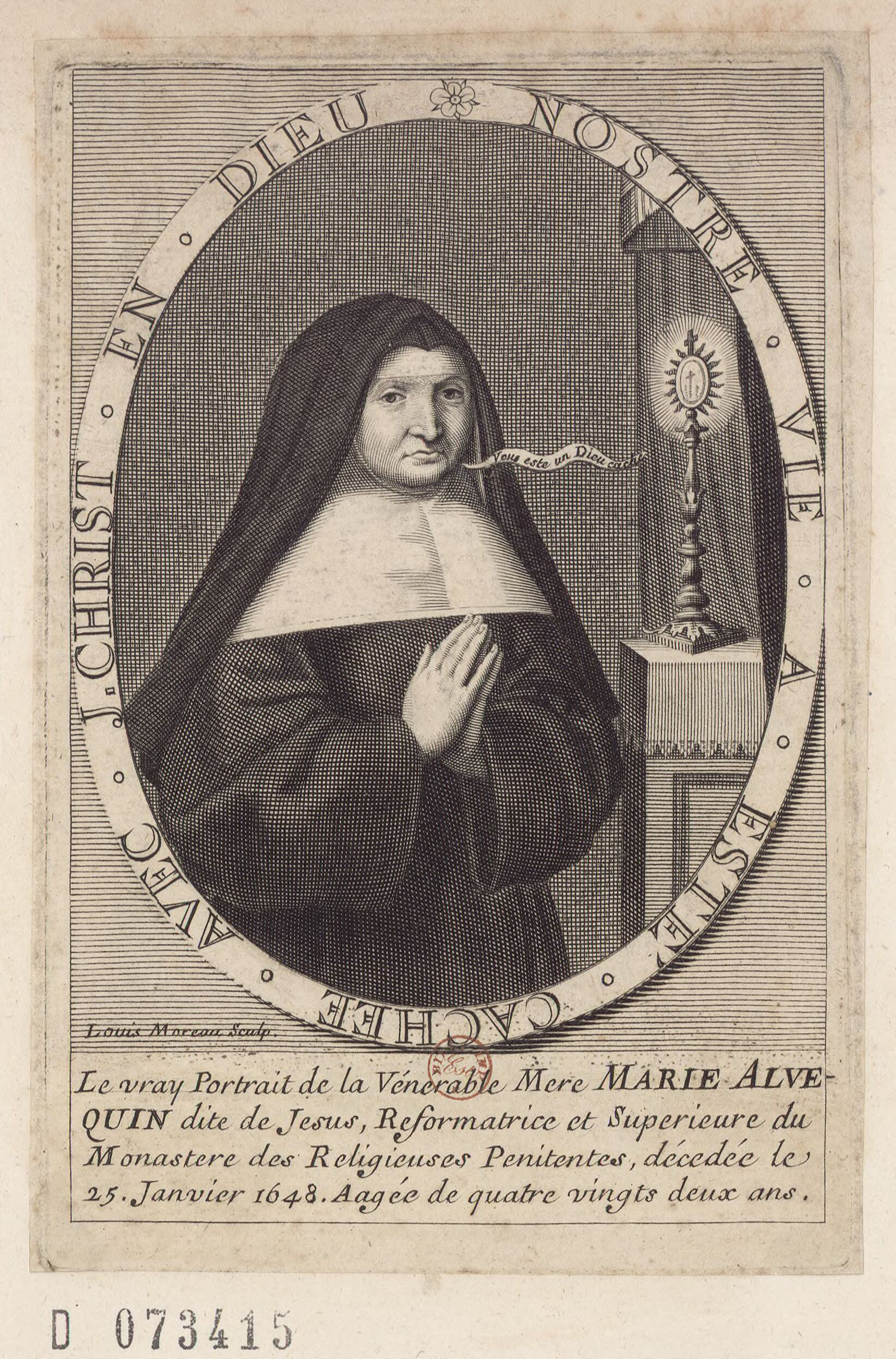
- Born: 1566
- Died: 25 January 1648
- Occupations: Abbess of Saint-Magloire, Paris
- Parent(s): Philippe Alvequin; Marie Rolland

Marie Alvequin (1566 – 25 January 1648) was a nun. As a reforming mother superior she restored order to the Penitent Daughters at the Monastery of Saint-Magloire in Paris, where she arrived to take charge in 1616.

== Life ==
Marie Alvequin was born in 1566 into a Paris family, third of the four recorded daughters of Philippe Alvequin by his marriage to Marie Rolland. Marie followed the example of her elder sister, Catherine Alvequin, in 1578 Marie entering the monastery (convent) at Montmartre on the north side of the city. The period was a turbulent one, following the Siege of 1590, during which two artillery pieces were mounted on the abbey, a new abbess arrived in 1597. The abbess Marie de Beauvilliers is credited with returning Montmatre to an observance of religious discipline, and the Alvequin sisters were moved to re-examine the direction of their own vocations.

On 2 July 1616, accompanied by six other penitent sisters from Montmartre, Marie Alvequin transferred to the Monastery of Saint-Magloire in Paris. Marie Alvequin shared the view monasticism had fallen into moral and spiritual decline during the religious wars that had followed the emergence of Protestantism. The recent establishment at the monastery in Montmartre of the Order of the Penitent Sisters "Ordre de la pénitence de la Madelaine" was part of a wider fight-back. The transfer of Marie Alvequin and her six companions to Saint-Magloire marked a further stage in the process. Marie was installed as Mother Superior (abbess). She remained at the Monastery of Saint-Magloire till her death, aged 82, early in 1642, by when she had acquired a strong reputation for her saintliness ("dans une grande reputation de sainteté"). During her time in charge she had quickly restored compliance with the rules. A particularly visible change regarded vestments, which were simplified and now incorporated a black veil. Sources refer to a wide range of her reforms, few of which are spelled out. She removed the requirement for the nuns to get up every night for a midnight service, changing its time to 8 in the evening. Instructions from the bishop, which she appears to have respected, involved the need to follow the Rule of St. Augustine.

One of the trends that followed the religious turmoil of the sixteenth century was an increasing propensity to demonise certain classes of unmarried women. Particularly in those parts of Europe that had switched to Protestantism, a manifestation of this was the seventeenth century surge in recorded prosecutions for witchcraft, which is reflected in the English language historiographies from Britain and North America. In Catholic parts of Europe, where monasticism persisted more robustly, there was a greater focus on diabolic possession, which could be seen as a particular risk in the case of nuns. As abbess of Saint-Magloire, Marie Alvequin was blessed with the gift of Discernment regarding God's will, and accordingly took to patrolling the convent at night in order to console and support any nun found to be under demonic attack.
