= Louise Adélaïde de Bourbon (1757–1824) =

French royal; daughter of Louis Joseph, Prince of Condé

- Abbess of Remiremont
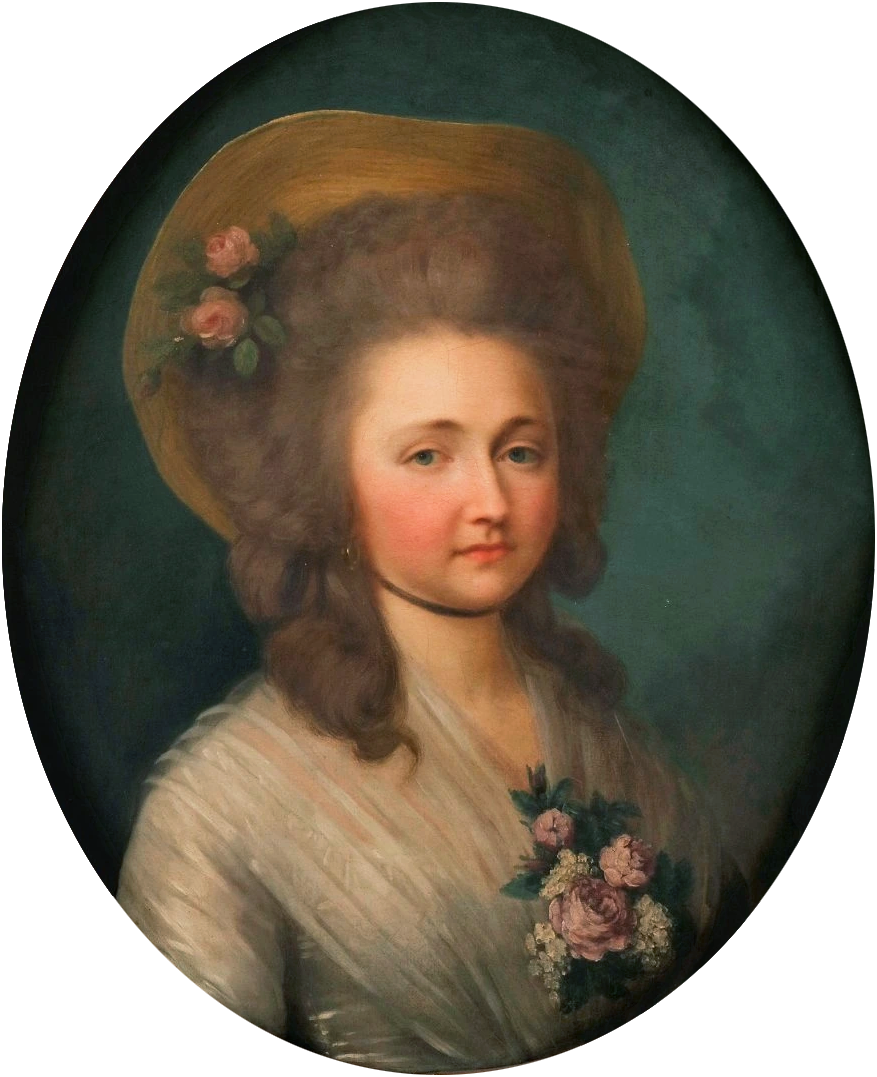
- Portrait, c. 1780s
- Born: 5 October 1757; Château de Chantilly, France
- Died: 10 March 1824 (aged 66); Paris, France
- Burial: Abbaye Saint-Louis de Limon, Vauhallan, France
- House: Bourbon-Condé
- Father: Louis Joseph de Bourbon
- Mother: Charlotte de Rohan
- Religion: Roman Catholicism

Louise Adélaïde de Bourbon (5 October 1757 – 10 March 1824) was a French nun. She was the last Remiremont abbess and founded at the beginning of the Bourbon Restoration a religious community that became famous among French Catholics under the name of Bénédictines de la rue Monsieur. She constructed the Hôtel de Mademoiselle de Condé, named after her.

== Early life ==
Born at the Château de Chantilly in 1757, Louise Adélaïde was the third and last child of Louis Joseph de Bourbon, prince de Condé and his wife, Charlotte de Rohan (1737–1760), the daughter of Charles de Rohan, prince de Soubise. As a member of the reigning House of Bourbon, she was born a princesse du sang; this entitled her to the style of Her Serene Highness. She was educated at the Pentemont Abbey, one of Paris' most prestigious schools for daughters of the aristocracy.

At court, she was known as Mademoiselle de Condé and in some sources is styled as princesse de Condé. A descendant of le Grand Condé, Louise Adelaïde was the aunt of the last duc d'Enghien. She was also a second cousin of the future revolutionary, Philippe Égalité. A first cousin was Charles Alain, Prince of Guéméné, son of her aunt Victoire de Rohan, princesse de Guéméné.

Her mother died at the Hôtel de Condé after a long illness as reported by the Duke of Luynes; at the time, Louise Adélaïde was just three years of age. As a result, Louise Adélaïde was raised by her great-aunt, Henriette Louise de Bourbon (1703–1772), the Benedictine abbess of the Beaumont Abbey (now in Tours).

== Abbess of Beaumont-lès-Tours ==
Louise Adélaïde was supposed to marry her distant cousin Charles Philippe, comte d'Artois, but the marriage fell through; Charles later married Princess Maria Theresa of Savoy and eventually became King Charles X of France during the Bourbon Restoration.

Due to her convent education, almost all of Louise Adélaïde's youth was spent in a religious setting. Her education was completed at the royal abbey of Bernardine Panthémont, located in the 7th arrondissement of Paris. In 1780, Mademoiselle de Condé requested permission to leave the convent of Panthémont. It was at this time that she built the Hôtel de Bourbon-Condé for her personal use, her father still retaining the grand Palais Bourbon built by his grandmother, Louise-Françoise de Bourbon, as his principal residence in Paris. Considerations of rank prevented her from marriage. In 1786, she was appointed Abbess of Remiremont. She did not, however, visit Remiremont more than three times during her period in office

== Last years and death ==
In 1789, she fled to Belgium to escape the first stages of the French Revolution. In 1802, in Poland, she took the veil, returning to Paris in 1816 to found a religious institution. She was later the Lady of Saint Pierre and Metz and Cetera, lordships she held in her own right. Her father died in 1818. Louise Adélaïde died quietly in Paris six years later, in 1824. Six months after her death, her former suitor, the comte d'Artois, succeeded to the French throne as King Charles X.

She was buried at the Abbaye Saint-Louis de Limon, Vauhallan.

== Ancestry ==
Ancestors of Louise Adélaïde de Bourbon (1757–1824)

8. Louis de Bourbon, Prince of Condé
4. Louis Henri de Bourbon, Duke of Bourbon, Prince of Condé
9. Louise-Françoise de Bourbon, Légitimée de France
2. Louis Joseph de Bourbon, Prince of Condé
10. Ernest Leopold, Landgrave of Hesse-Rotenburg
5. Landgravine Caroline of Hesse-Rotenburg
11. Countess Eleonora Maria Anna of Löwenstein-Wertheim-Rochefort
1. Louise Adélaïde de Bourbon
12. Jules François Louis de Rohan, Prince of Soubise
6. Charles de Rohan, Prince of Soubise
13. Anne Julie Adélaïde de Melun, Princess of Soubise
3. Charlotte de Rohan
14. Emmanuel-Théodose de La Tour d'Auvergne, Duke of Bouillon
7. Anne Marie Louise de La Tour d'Auvergne
15. Anne Marie Christiane de Simiane
