= Maria Theresa of Savoy =

Countess of Artois (1756–1805)

Marie Thérèse of Savoy
- Countess of Artois
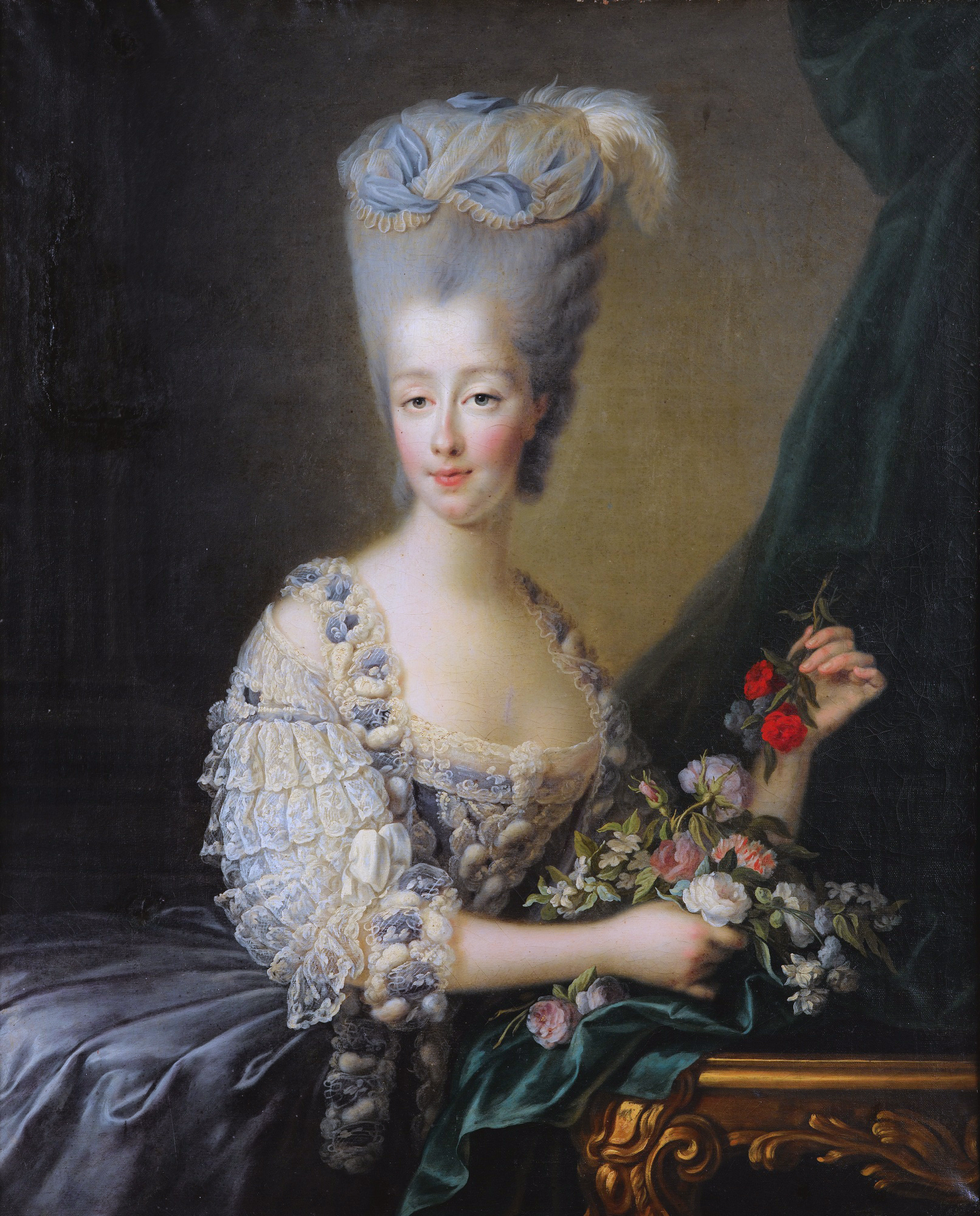
- Portrait of Maria Theresa of Savoy by François-Hubert Drouais, 1775
- Born: 31 January 1756; Royal Palace, Turin, Savoy
- Died: 2 June 1805 (aged 49); Graz, Austrian Empire
- Burial: Imperial Mausoleum, Graz, Austria
- Spouse: Charles X of France (m. 1773)
- Issue Detail: Louis Antoine, Duke of Angoulême; Sophie, Mademoiselle d'Artois; Charles Ferdinand, Duke of Berry; Marie Thérèse, Mademoiselle d'Angoulême
Names
- Italian: Maria Teresa di Savoia; French: Marie-Thérèse de Savoie
- House: Savoy
- Father: Victor Amadeus III of Sardinia
- Mother: Maria Antonia Ferdinanda of Spain

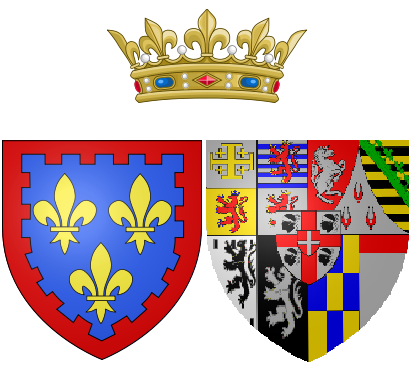

Maria Theresa of Savoy (French: Marie Thérèse de Savoie; 31 January 1756 – 2 June 1805) was a French princess by marriage to Charles Philippe, Count of Artois. Her husband was the grandson of Louis XV and younger brother of Louis XVI. 19 years after Maria Theresa’s death, he assumed the throne of France as King Charles X. Her son Louis Antoine, Duke of Angoulême, married Marie Antoinette's daughter Marie-Thérèse Charlotte.

== Biography ==
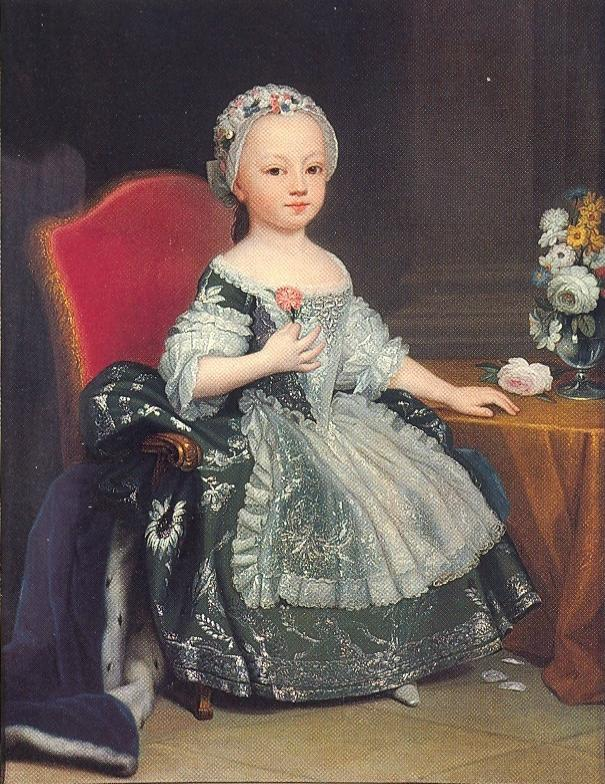
Portrait of Princess Maria Theresa in her early years (by Giuseppe Duprà, ca. 1762)

Princess Maria Theresa of Savoy was born at the Royal Palace in Turin during the reign of her grandfather Charles Emmanuel III of Sardinia. The daughter of the heir apparent Victor Amadeus and his wife Maria Antonia Ferdinanda of Spain, she was the couple's third daughter and fifth child of twelve children. She was raised with her sister Princess Maria Giuseppina, who was three years her senior and whom she would join later as a member of the Royal House of France.

=== Marriage ===
Her aunts, Maria Luisa of Savoy and Eleonora of Savoy, were once proposed as brides for Louis Stanislas' father Louis.

Following a series of dynastic alliances, Maria Theresa was betrothed to the Count of Artois, the youngest grandson of the reigning Louis XV of France and his popular wife, Queen Marie Leszczyńska. Artois had previously been intended to marry Louise Adélaïde de Bourbon, the daughter of the Prince of Condé. However, the union never took place as her rank was much lower than Artois who, as a male-line descendant of a French monarch, was a grandson of France.

Her marriage was arranged as a part of a series of Franco-Savoyard dynastic marriages taking place in a time span of eight years: after the wedding between her cousin Princess Marie Thérèse Louise of Savoy-Carignano and Louis Alexandre, Prince of Lamballe, and the wedding between her elder sister Marie Joséphine of Savoy and Louis Stanislas, Count of Provence in 1771, Maria Teresa was married to the Count of Artois (future King Charles X of France) in 1773, and her eldest brother Prince Charles Emmanuel of Savoy (the future King of Sardinia) was married to her sister-in-law Princess Clotilde of France in 1775. Her eldest brother-in-law, Dauphin Louis Auguste (the future Louis XVI), was since three years prior married to Marie Antoinette.

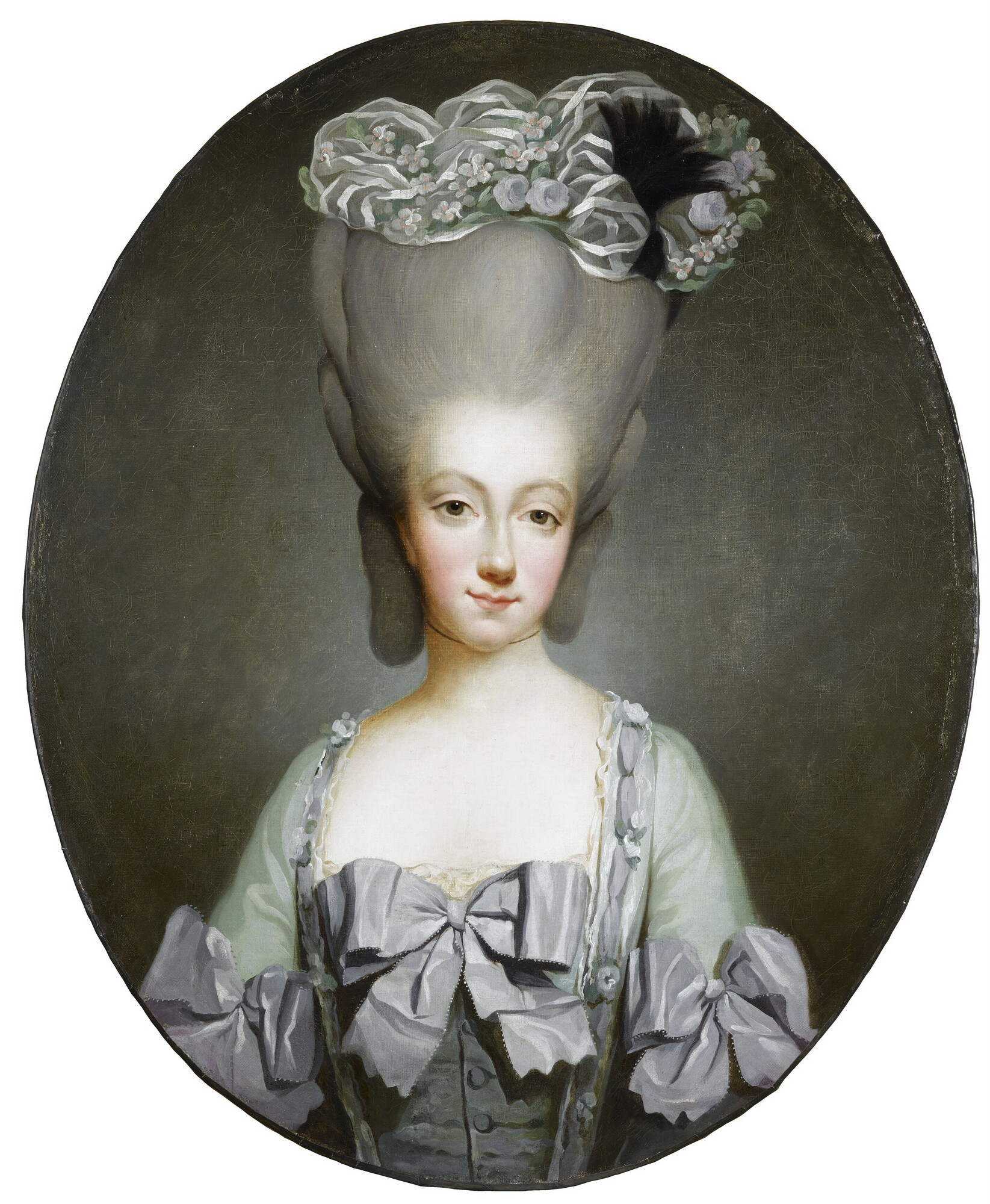
A portrait of Princess Maria Theresa in 1775, two years after her marriage in 1773 (by Joseph Ducreux)

Maria Theresa married the Count in a proxy ceremony at the Palazzina di caccia of Stupinigi before she crossed the bridge of Beauvoisin between Savoy and France, where she was turned over by her Italian retinue to her French entourage, after which her official marriage took place at the Palace of Versailles on 16 November 1773.

As her husband was the grandson of a king, the newly named Marie Thérèse held the rank of granddaughter of France, and was commonly referred to by the simple style Madame la comtesse d'Artois.

=== Countess of Artois ===
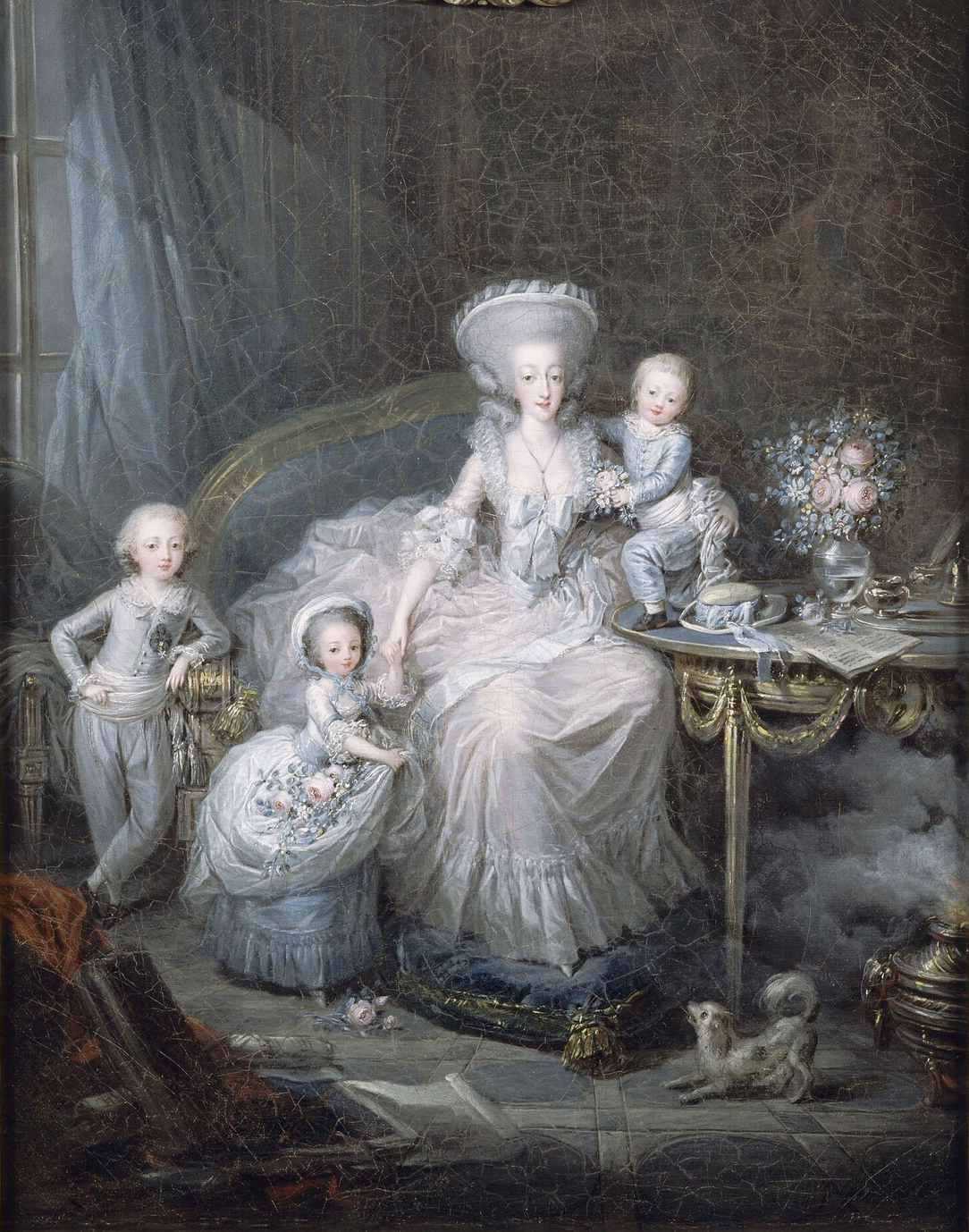
Marie Thérèse with her three surviving children, by Charles Le Clercq, 1783.

Maria Theresa was described as diminutive, somewhat ill-shaped, clumsy and with a long nose and was not regarded a beauty, but her complexion was generally admired; as a person, she was regarded as "not distinguished in any sense", but nevertheless goodhearted. Florimond Claude, Comte de Mercy-Argenteau, who corresponded with Holy Roman Empress Maria Theresa regarding Marie Antoinette, said that she was silent and interested in absolutely nothing. The brother of Marie Antoinette, Joseph II, Holy Roman Emperor, said of her during his visit to France in 1777 that she was the only one in the royal family "to give birth to children, but is in all other aspects a complete idiot."

During her first years in France, the three royal couples; the Count and Countess of Provence, the Count and Countess of Artois, the Dauphin and Dauphine, as well as her cousin, the Princess of Lamballe, who was the favorite of Marie Antoinette, formed a circle of friends and acted in amateur theater plays together, before an audience only consisting of the Dauphin. This intimate friendship, however, gradually deteriorated after the succession of Louis XVI to the throne in 1774.

Roughly a year after Maria Theresa's arrival at Versailles, she became pregnant with her first child, Louis Antoine, Duke of Angoulême: He was the first child of the new royal generation, which was an important event, as there was at that point concern for the succession because the marriage of both the King as well as that of the first of his brothers, the Count of Provence, were childless, and the birth was reportedly stressful to Marie Antoinette, at the time anxious for the consummation of her marriage to take place and concerned for her lack of children. After this birth, Marie Antoinette was harassed by the public for not having given birth herself. The next year Maria Theresa gave birth to a daughter, Sophie, who was known as Mademoiselle as the most senior unmarried princess at court. She died at the age of seven in 1783. Her second son, Charles Ferdinand, Duke of Berry, was born in 1778. Her last child, Marie Thérèse d'Artois, presumably named after her mother, died while the court was at Choisy-le-Roi at the age of just 6 months.

Prior to the meeting of the Estates General, every member of the Royal Family was publicly mocked by libelous verses, in which Maria Theresa was claimed to have given birth to an illegitimate child.

=== Exile ===
Maria Theresa left France with her spouse after the Storming of the Bastille on 14 July 1789, which marked the beginning of the French Revolution, and took refuge in her homeland of Savoy. She left one week after her spouse with a retinue of thirty people, and since she had her possessions sold in connection to her trip, the couple's official statement that they were to return in spring was doubted.

When her spouse left Savoy in 1791, she stayed behind, and the couple lived separated for the rest of their lives. The Count of Artois refused to give her permission to stay with or visit him, even refusing her to attend the wedding of her son the Duke of Angoulême to Marie Thérèse of France in Mitau. Soon after her husband's departure, her two sons also left Savoy to serve in the Condé emigré army. Maria Theresa was described as desolate and deeply saddened after her husband and her sons had left her in Savoy, and reportedly contemplated becoming a nun. She was persuaded not to enter a convent by her sister-in-law Clothilde, who appealed to her sense of duty to her children, and Maria Theresa later expressed gratitude toward Clothilde for this. In 1792, she was joined in Turin by her sister Marie Josephine. Their presence in Savoy was politically sensitive, as it disturbed the relations between France and Savoy.

In April 1796, when Savoy was defeated by France under Napoleon Bonaparte during the Italian campaigns of the French Revolutionary Wars, Maria Theresa and her sister Marie Joséphine left Turin for Novara, in parallel with the departure of Marie Joséphine's husband from Verona. While her sister continued to Austria, Maria Therese accepted her father's invitation to return to Turin after the peace between France and Savoy in May.

In December 1798, when Piemonte was annexed by France, Maria Theresa left with her lady-in-waiting for Graz in Austria, where she was permitted to remain and where she died in 1805. Because she died before her spouse became King of France, she remained Countess of Artois. She was buried in the Imperial Mausoleum near to Graz Cathedral.

== Issue ==
1. Louis Antoine, Duke of Angoulême (Versailles, 6 August 1775 – Görtz, 3 June 1844) married Marie Thérèse of France, had no issue.
2. Sophie, Mademoiselle d'Artois (Versailles, 5 August 1776 – Versailles, 5 December 1783) died in childhood.
3. Charles Ferdinand, Duke of Berry (Versailles, 24 January 1778 – Paris, 14 February 1820); married Princess Maria Carolina of Naples and Sicily and had issue.
4. Marie Thérèse d'Artois, Mademoiselle d'Angoulême (Versailles, 6 January 1783 – Château de Choisy, 22 June 1783) died in infancy.

== Gallery ==
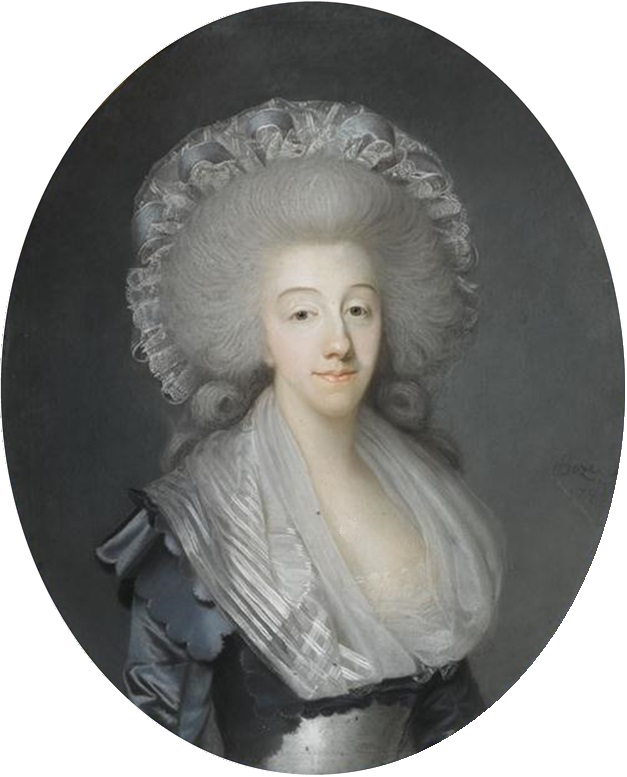
Maria Theresa of Savoy in 1785.

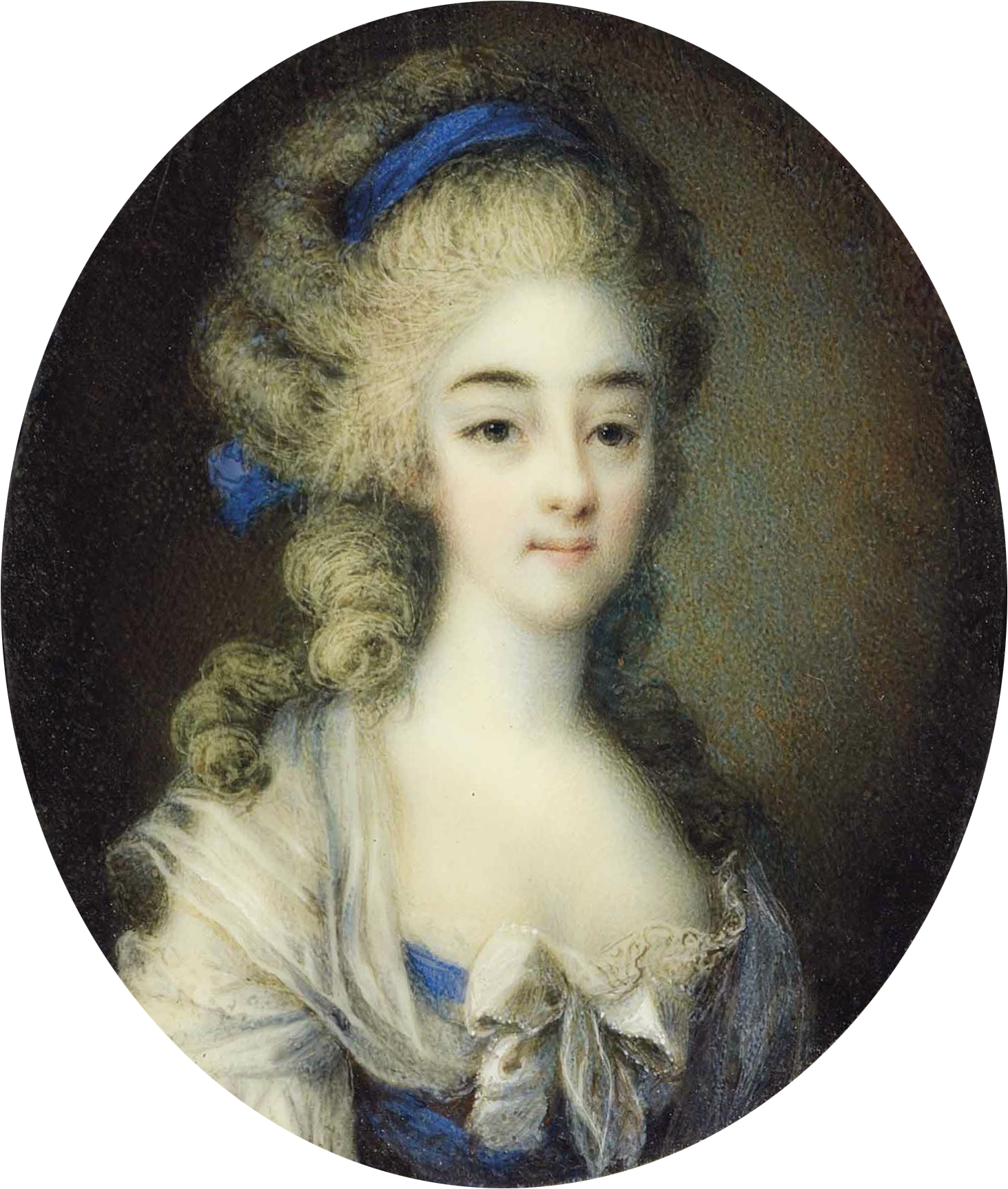
A portrait miniature of the Countess of Artois clad in a white dress with a blue bodice and a white bow (by Ignace Jean Victor Campana).

== Ancestry ==
Ancestors of Maria Theresa of Savoy

8. Victor Amadeus II of Sardinia
4. Charles Emmanuel III of Sardinia
9. Anne Marie of Orléans
2. Victor Amadeus III of Sardinia
10. Ernest Leopold, Landgrave of Hesse-Rotenburg
5. Polyxena of Hesse-Rotenburg
11. Eleonore of Löwenstein-Wertheim-Rochefort
1. Marie Thérèse of Savoy
12. Louis, Dauphin of France
6. Philip V of Spain
13. Maria Anna Victoria of Bavaria
3. Maria Antonia Ferdinanda of Spain
14. Odoardo Farnese, Hereditary Prince of Parma
7. Elisabeth Farnese
15. Dorothea Sophie of Neuburg

== References and notes ==
Media related to Princess Maria Theresa of Savoy at Wikimedia Commons
