= Hôtel de Bourbon-Condé =

Coordinates: 48°51′3.13″N 2°18′56.66″E

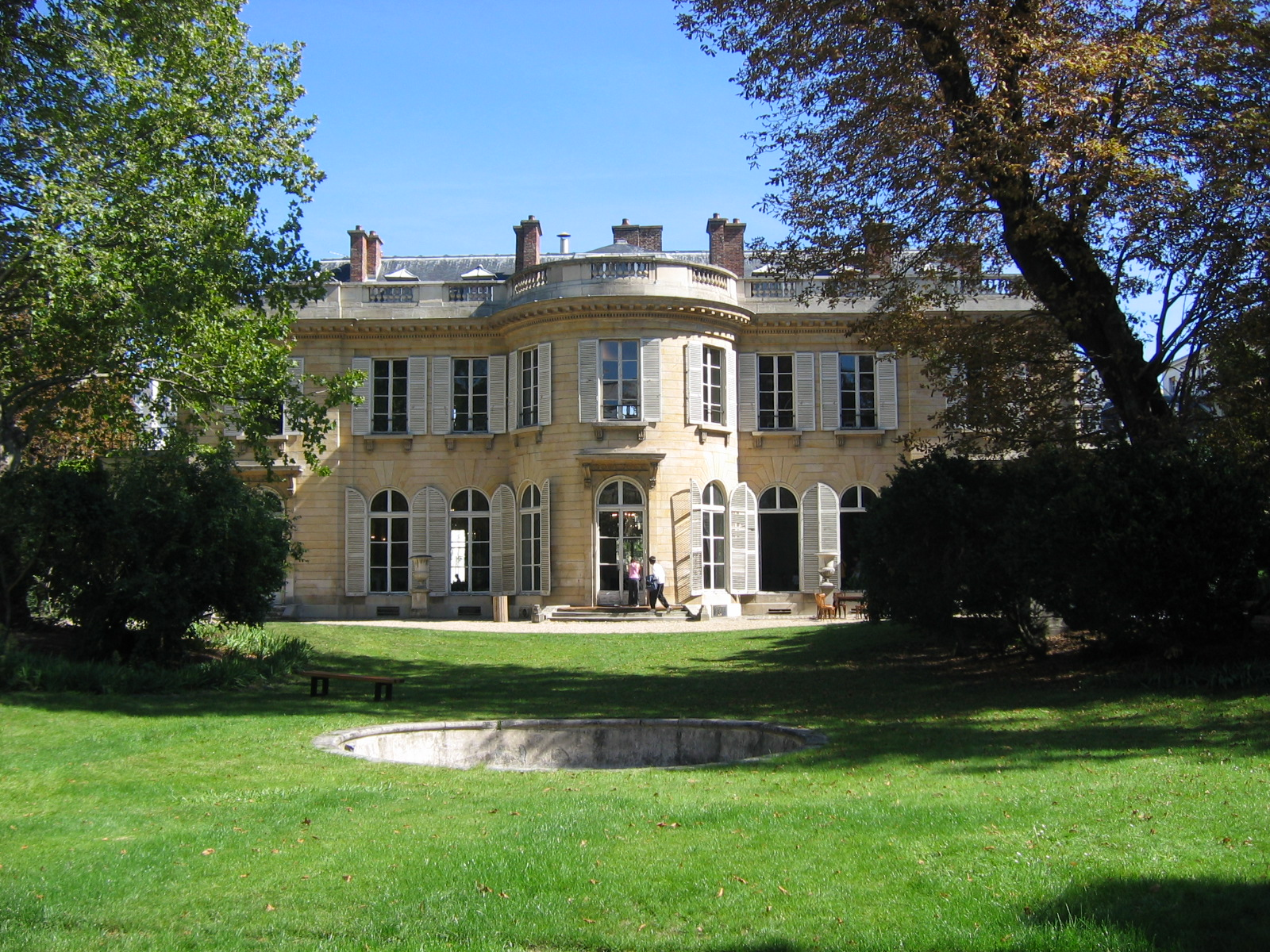
- Garden façade
- Interactive map of the Hôtel de Bourbon-Condé area

General information
- Location: 7th arrondissement of Paris, France

The hôtel de Bourbon-Condé (French pronunciation: [otɛl də buʁbɔ̃ kɔ̃de]) is an hôtel particulier, a kind of grand private townhouse in France, at 12 rue Monsieur, in the 7th arrondissement of Paris. It was commissioned by Louis-Joseph, prince de Condé for his daughter, Louise-Adélaïde de Bourbon, and designed by architect Alexandre-Théodore Brongniart.

== History ==
In 1780 the twenty-three-year-old unmarried daughter of the prince de Condé, Louise-Adélaïde, also known as Mademoiselle de Condé, requested permission to leave the convent of Penthemont, where she had been educated, to live in the world. To suit her station in life a generous site was purchased in the rue Monsieur on the Rive Gauche, where Brongniart erected a splendid house. Previously, while working for the marquis de Montesquiou in 1778, Brongniart had received permission to open the rue Monsieur, where he also built stables for the comte de Provence, and a hôtel for the archives of the ordre de Saint-Lazare. The mansion was situated behind an enclosed courtyard, entered through a central carriage passage, and faced a garden into which the central oval salon projected.

By 1782 the menuisier Georges Jacob had delivered seat furnishings to the amount of 13,958 livres and Jean-François Leleu, a prominent ébéniste, had rendered a bill for veneered case-pieces, but no detailed contemporary description of the interiors survives: Horace Walpole mentioned this 'hôtel de Condé' in passing as an exemplar of the latest French Neoclassical taste, after he had his first view of the Prince of Wales's Carlton House, London, in September 1785.

The garden, made in an English style, was landscaped in the genre pittoresque, the informal 'picturesque genre' that was one aspect of French Anglomania in the 1780s. From the boulevard des Invalides, passing along the garden, an open iron fence gave passers-by a view of the principal façade, the garden front in its landscaped setting.

In the forecourt, long stucco panels in low-relief of children engaged in Bacchanalian procession were supplied by Clodion (Claude Michel). The art historian Michael Levey has written that 'the superb stucco decorations for the courtyard of the Hôtel de Bourbon-Condé ... [are] wonderfully zestful and redolent of the Renaissance in [their] unforced, enchanted pagan air, bringing hints of the countryside of antiquity into late eighteenth-century urban Paris.' The bas-reliefs were eventually removed from the walls of the courtyard and some have been conserved at the Metropolitan Museum of Art since 1959.

Considerations of rank prevented Mademoiselle de Condé from marriage; in 1789 she left France with her father as the French Revolution began. In 1802, while in Poland, she became a nun, before returning to Paris in 1816, to consecrate the rest of her life to religious work. She died in 1824, but she never again resided in Brongniart's hôtel de Bourbon-Condé.

== Gallery ==
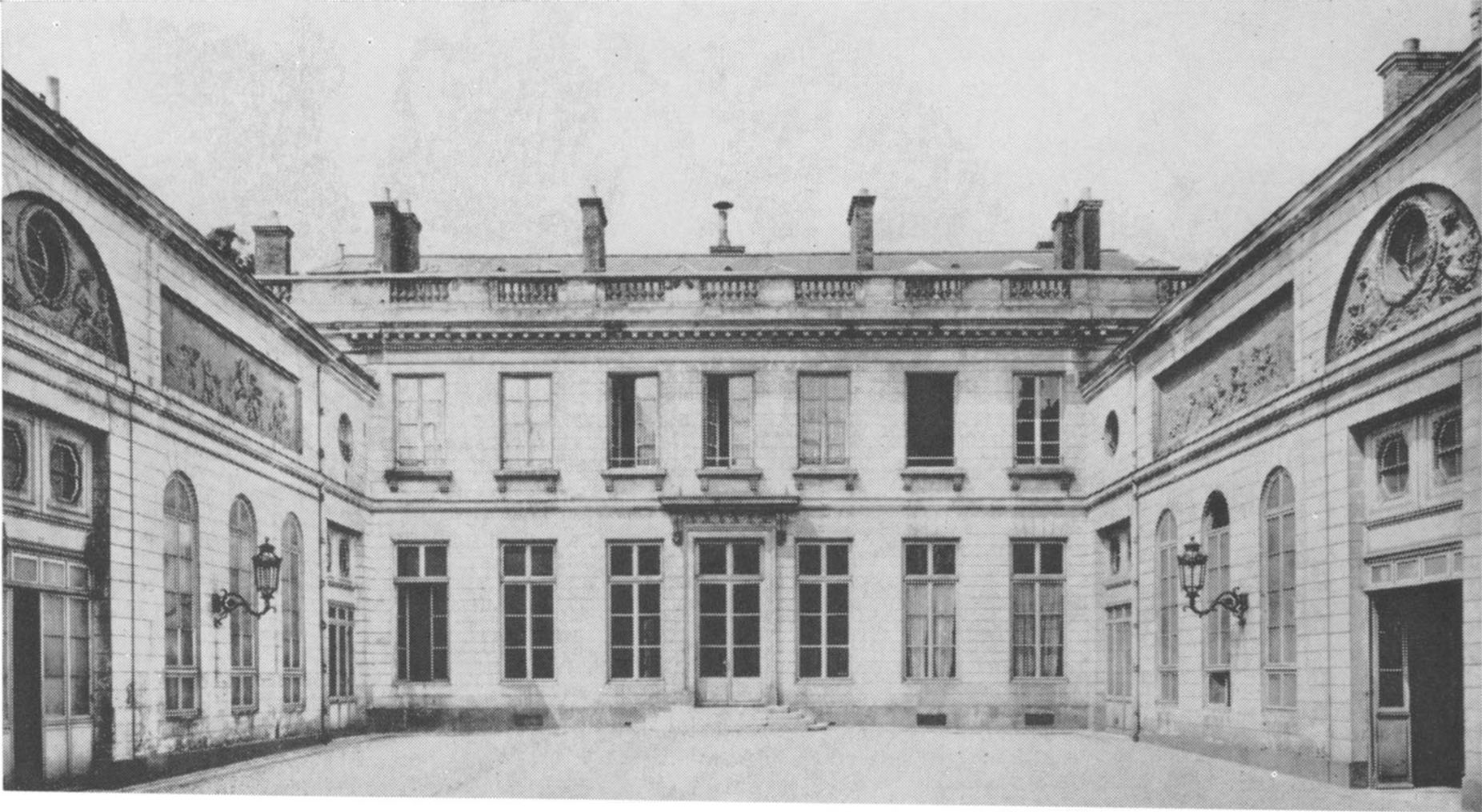
Interior courtyard photograph (c. 1920)

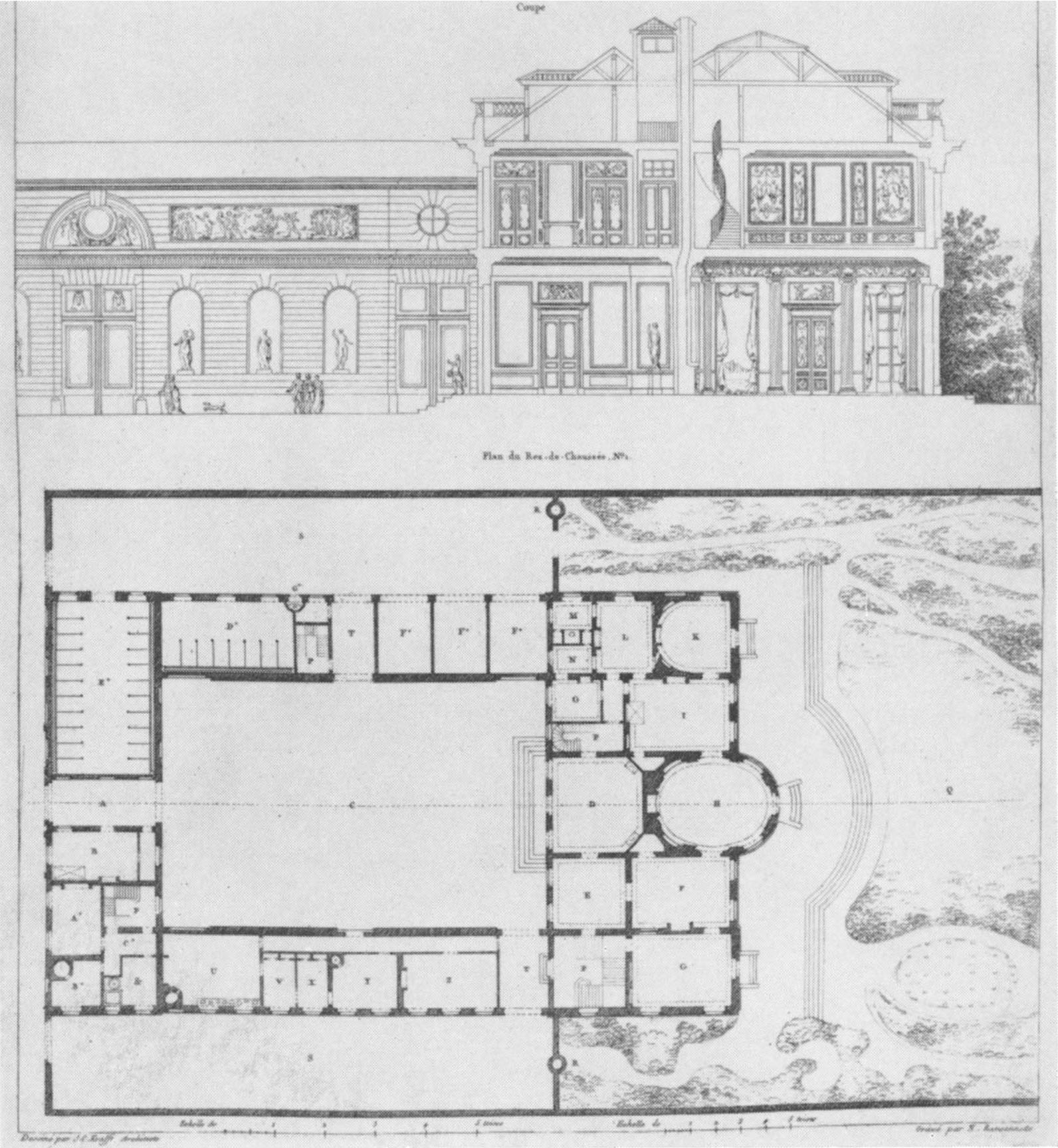
Elevation and floor plan. In the elevation, the sculptures to be added by Clodion were 'fancifully interpreted'. In the plan north, is down; the rue Monsieur, to the left; and the boulevard des Invalides, to the right.

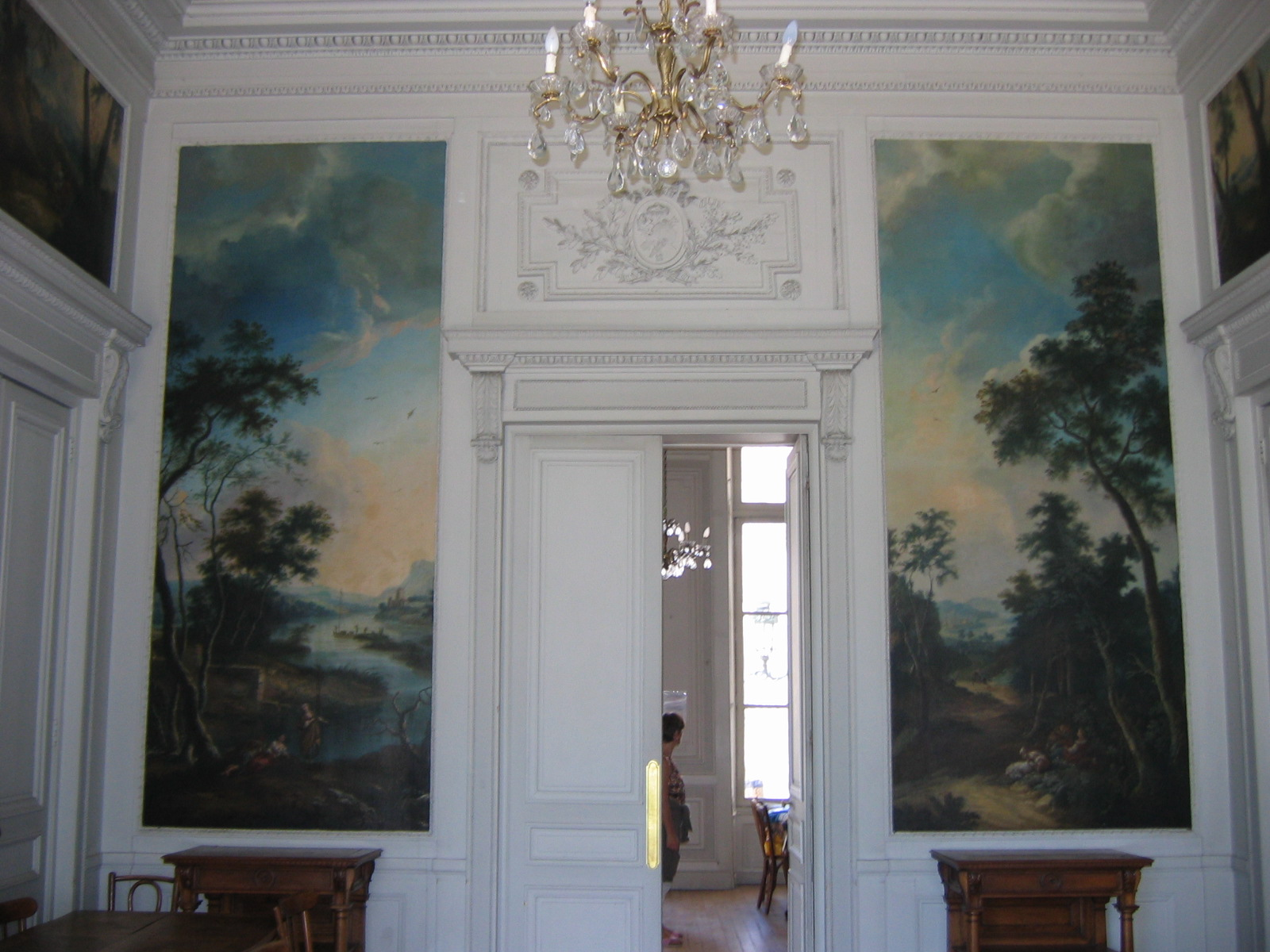
Interior

== See also ==
- Hôtel de Condé

== Sources ==
- Bauchal, Charles (1887). Nouveau dictionnaire biographique et critique des architectes français (in French). Paris: André, Daly Fils. View at Google Books
- Braham, Allan (1980). The architecture of the French enlightenment, pp. 210–219. Berkeley, California: University of California Press. ISBN 978-0-520-04117-2. Limited view at Google Books.
- Cunningham, Peter, ed. (1906). The letters of Horace Walpole: fourth earl of Orford, vol. 9, p. 14. Edinburgh: John Grant. View at Google Books.
- Levey, Michael (1995). Painting and Sculpture in France 1700-1789. New Haven, Connecticut: Yale University Press. ISBN 978-0-300-06494-0. Limited view at Google Books.
- Parker, James (1967). "Clodion's Bas-Reliefs from the Hôtel de Condé" in The Metropolitan Museum of Art Bulletin New Series, 25.6 (February 1967): 230–241., originally available at metmuseum.org.
