= Peray =

- Commune
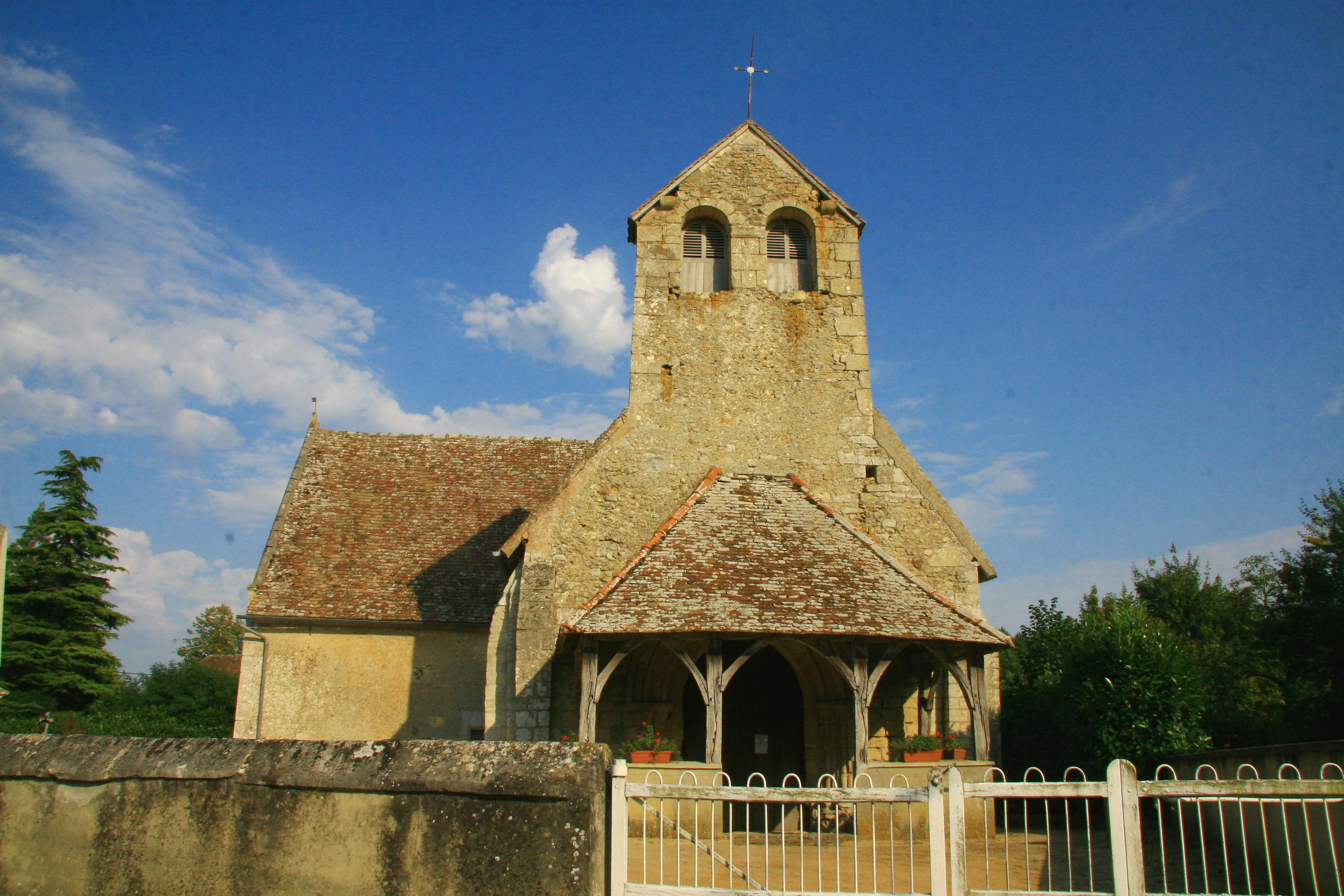
- The church of Saint Jouin, in Peray

- Coat of arms
- Location of Peray
- Location within France Location within Pays de la Loire
- Coordinates: 48°14′55″N 0°21′52″E
- Country: France
- Region: Pays de la Loire
- Department: Sarthe
- Arrondissement: Mamers
- Canton: Mamers
- Intercommunality: Maine Saosnois

Government
  - Mayor (2020–2026): Jean-Luc Godimus
- Area^{1}: 2.45 km^{2} (0.95 sq mi)
- Highest elevation: 96 m (315 ft)
- Lowest elevation: 62 m (203 ft)
- Population (2023): 70
  - Density: 29/km^{2} (74/sq mi)
- Demonym(s): Peréen, Peréenne; Perayen, Perayenne
- Time zone: UTC+01:00 (CET)
  - Summer (DST): UTC+02:00 (CEST)
- INSEE/Postal code: 72233 /72260
- ^{1} French Land Register data, which excludes lakes, ponds, glaciers > 1 km^{2} (0.386 sq mi or 247 acres) and river estuaries.

Peray (French pronunciation: [pəʁɛ]) is a commune in the Sarthe department in the region of Pays de la Loire in north-western France.

== World War II ==
After the liberation of the area by Allied Forces in August 1944, engineers of the Ninth Air Force IX Engineering Command began construction of a combat Advanced Landing Ground outside of the town. Declared operational on 2 September, the airfield was designated as "A-44", it was used by several combat units until November 1944 when the units moved into Central France. Afterward, the airfield was closed.

== See also ==
- Communes of the Sarthe department
