= Sophie d'Artois =

- Mademoiselle d'Artois
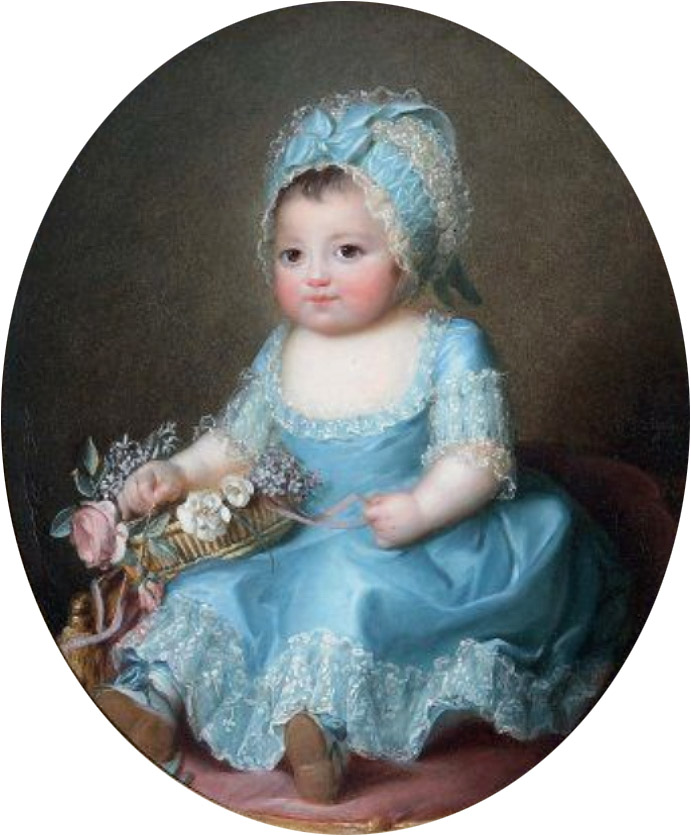
- Sophie c. 1776–1777
- Born: 5 August 1776; Palace of Versailles, France
- Died: 5 December 1783 (aged 7); Palace of Versailles, France
- Burial: Basilica of Saint-Denis
- Father: Charles, Count of Artois (later Charles X of France)
- Mother: Princess Maria Theresa of Savoy

Sophie d'Artois (5 August 1776 – 5 December 1783) was a member of the House of Bourbon as the elder daughter and second child of Charles X of France, the then Count of Artois, and Maria Theresa of Savoy.

== Early life ==
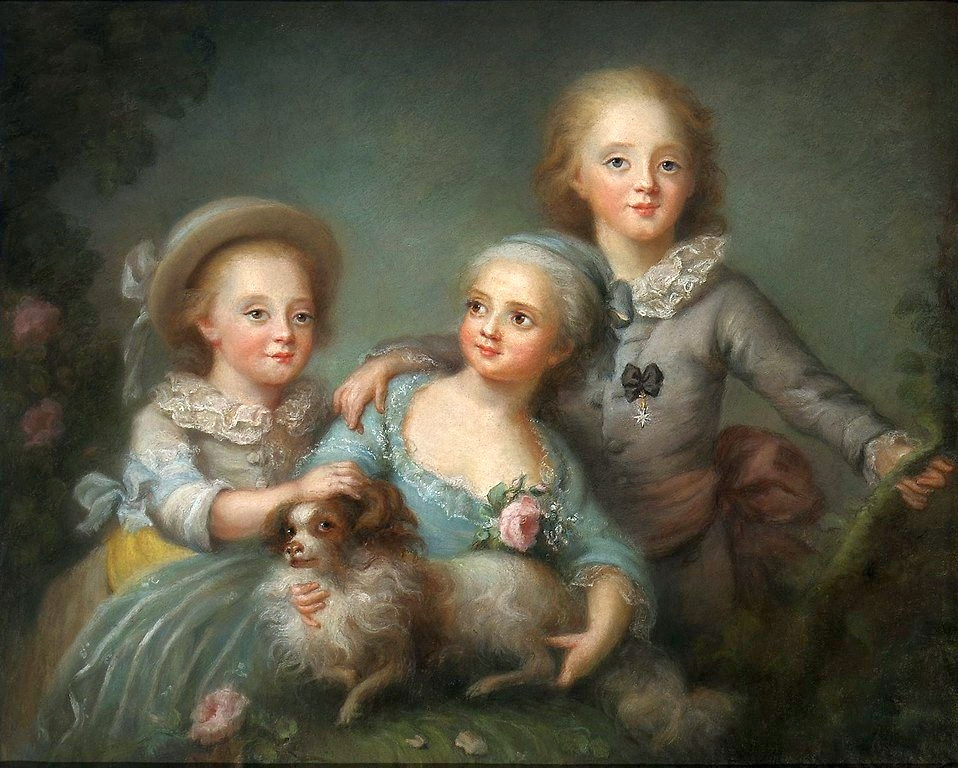
Sophie (center) with her older brother Louis Antoine and younger brother Charles Ferdinand, 1781.

Sophie d'Artois was born at the Palace of Versailles during the reign of her paternal uncle, Louis XVI. Her father was Charles Philippe de France, known as the Comte d'Artois. Her mother was Princess Maria Theresa of Savoy, third daughter of Victor Amadeus III of Sardinia and Maria Antonia of Spain.

== Biography ==
She was known as Mademoiselle – a very prestigious style of address which was given to the most senior unmarried princess at the court of Versailles. Sophie was also titled Mademoiselle d’Angoulême and Mademoiselle d'Artois – the former reflecting the Duke of Angoulême which was the title of her brother Louis Antoine d'Artois. Artois was derived from her father's Appanage of the County of Artois.

Her father, as a son of Louis, Dauphin of France, held the rank of Grandson of France. Louis XVI declared that his niece and her siblings would be regarded as Grandchildren of France, despite not being born to a King or Dauphin of France. This rank of Grandchild, which immediately followed the Children of France allowed Sophie to use the style of Royal Highness, but she was always known as Mademoiselle.

Sophie died at the Palace of Versailles at the age of seven. She was buried at the Royal Basilica of Saint Denis outside Paris, the traditional burial place of Bourbon royalty. Portraits of Sophie and her family exist at Versailles, one of them being by the famous Élisabeth-Louise Vigée-Le Brun.

== Ancestors ==
Ancestors of Sophie d'Artois

8. Louis XV of France
4. Louis, Dauphin of France
9. Marie Leszczyńska
2. Charles, Count of Artois
10. Augustus III of Poland
5. Maria Josepha of Saxony
11. Maria Josepha of Austria
1. Sophie d'Artois
12. Charles Emmanuel III of Sardinia
6. Victor Amadeus III of Sardinia
13. Polyxena of Hesse-Rotenburg
3. Marie Thérèse of Savoy
14. Philip V of Spain
7. Maria Antonia of Spain
15. Elisabeth Farnese
