= Beaumont-lès-Tours =

Former French commune

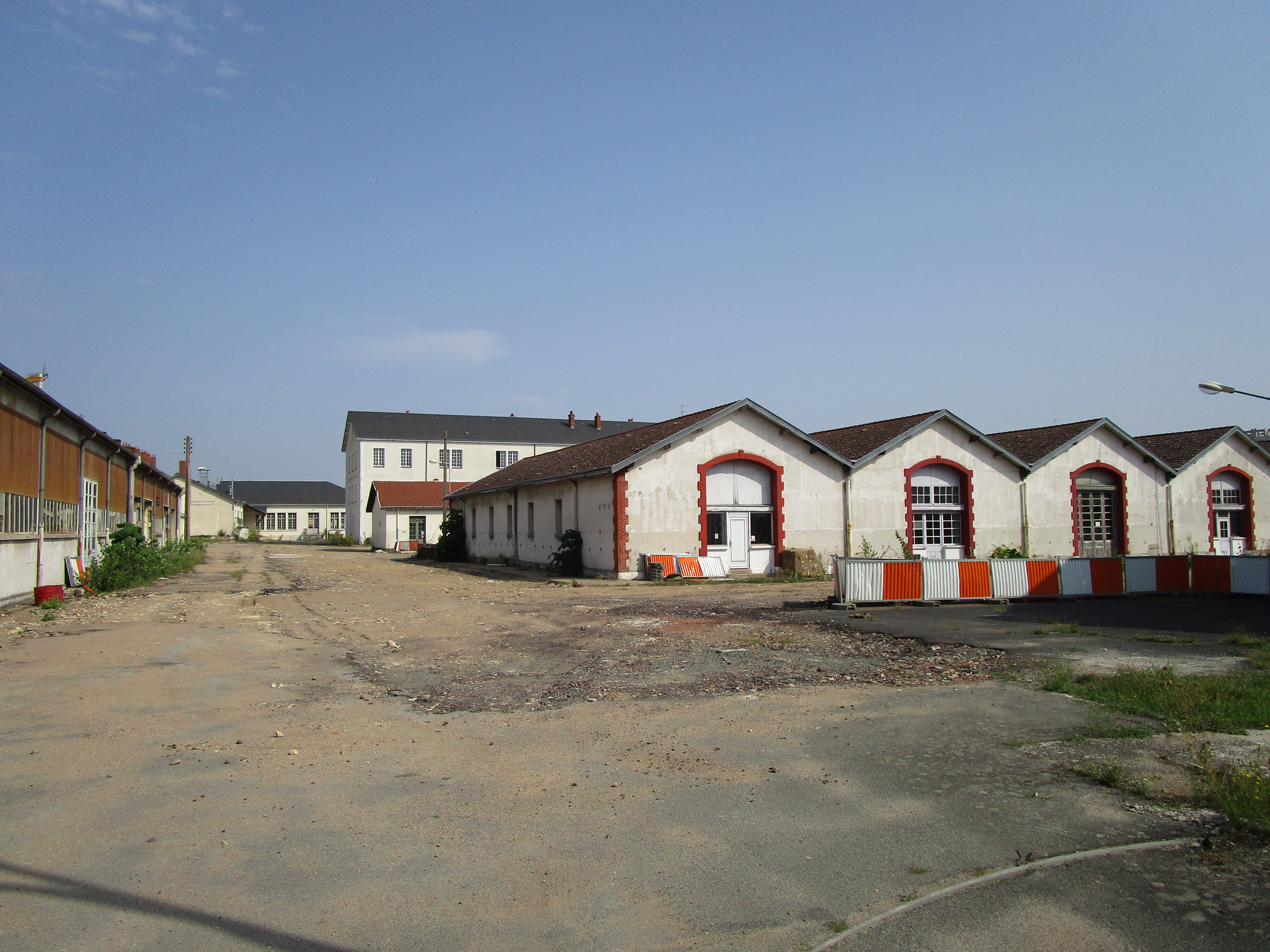
Beaumont-lès-Tours

Beaumont-lès-Tours, in the Indre-et-Loire department of France, is a former commune in the Touraine, near the large town of Tours.

It was famed for its large religious institution, the Benedictine Abbey of Beaumont-lès-Tours, once the home of Henriette Louise de Bourbon, Abbess of Beaumont-lès-Tours, great-granddaughter of Le Grand Condé, and granddaughter of Louis XIV and Madame de Montespan.

In 1828, the commune was annexed by the larger town of Saint-Étienne-Extra, which in turn was annexed by Tours in 1845.
