= Anna Leszczyńska (1699–1717) =

Princess of Poland (1699–1717)

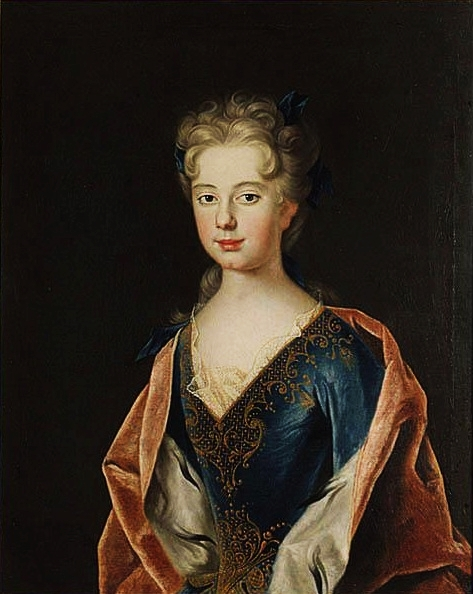
- Portrait by Johan Starbus, 1712
- Born: 25 May 1699; Poland
- Died: 20 June 1717 (aged 18); Mandelbachtal, Saarpfalz-Kreis, Palatine Zweibrücken
- Polish: Marianna Leszczyńska French: Marianne Leczinska
- House: Leszczyński
- Father: Stanisław Leszczyński
- Mother: Katarzyna Opalińska

Marianna "Anna" Leszczyńska (25 May 1699 – 20 June 1717) was Princess of Poland as the eldest child of King Stanisław Leszczyński and Catherine Opalińska. Her sister, Maria Leszczyńska, became Queen of France in 1725.

== Life ==
=== Childhood ===
Marianna Leszczyńska was born on 25 May 1699 in Poland, as the eldest child of Stanisław Leszczyński and Catherine Opalińska. Marianna was named after her paternal grandmother, Anna Jabłonowska, and was often called “Anna”.

Her only sister, Maria Leszczyńska, was born four years later in 1703 and was later crowned Queen of France as the consort of Louis XV. Between Stanisław's two daughters, Marianna seems to have been the favourite. She, reportedly, received a good education.

=== Death ===
Marianna died of pneumonia at the age of 18 in the district of Mandelbachtal in Saarpfalz-Kreis. She is buried in Gräfinthal cloister. Although her father called many doctors to her bedside, they likely accelerated her death by applying multiple purges and bleeding.

Her death devastated the Leszczyński family, especially her father, who asked his second daughter Maria to never pronounce the name of Anna before him again. Maria followed his instructions so carefully, even in front of her husband, that years later he was surprised to learn that she had a sister.

== Ancestry ==
Ancestors of Anna Leszczyńska (1699–1717)

16. Rafał Leszczyński
8. Bogusław Leszczyński
17. Anna Radzimińska
4. Rafał Leszczyński
18. Kaspar von Dönhoff
9. Joanna Katarzyna von Dönhoff
19. Anna Aleksandra Koniecpolska
2. Stanisław Leszczyński, King of Poland
20. Jan Jabłonowski
10. Stanisław Jan Jabłonowski
21. Anna Ostroróg
5. Anna Jabłonowska
22. Dominik Aleksander Kazanowski
11. Marianna Kazanowska
23. Anna Potocka
1. Anna Leszczyńska −
24. Piotr Opaliński
12. Krzysztof Opaliński
25. Zofia Kostka
6. Jan Karol Opaliński
26. Adam Sędziwój Czarnkowski
13. Teresa Konstancja Czarnkowska
27. Katarzyna Leszczyńska
3. Katarzyna Opalinska
28. Kazimierz Franciszek Czarnkowski
14. Adam Uriel Czarnkowski
29. Konstancja Lubomirska
7. Zofia Czarnkowska Opalińska
30. Remigian Zaleski
15. Teresa Zaleska
31. Anna Miełżyńska
