= Catherine Opalińska =

Queen of Poland (1704–1709, 1733–1736)

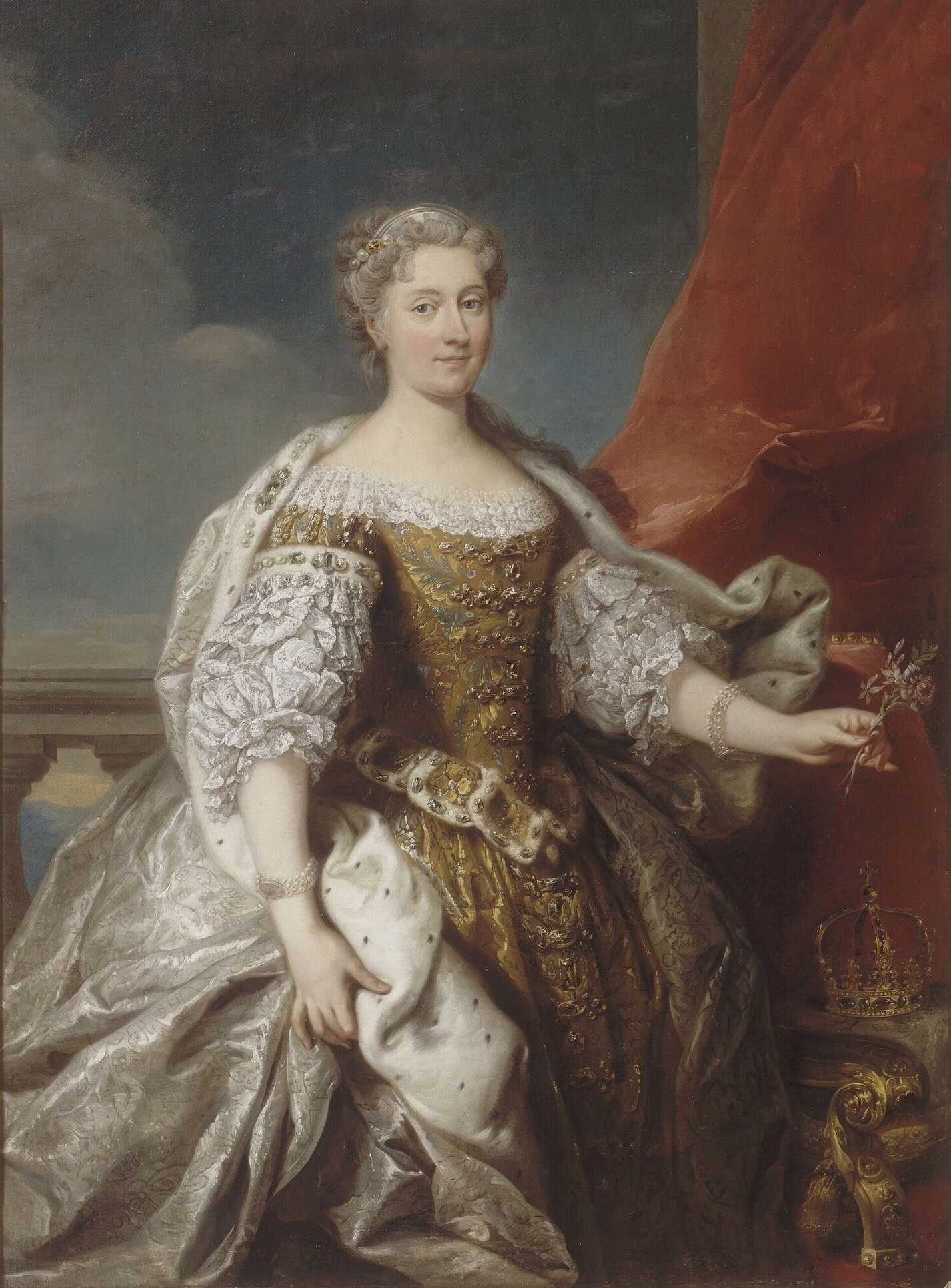
- Portrait by Jean-Baptiste van Loo, 1725

Queen consort of Poland Grand Duchess consort of Lithuania
- Tenure: 4 October 1704 – 8 August 1709; 12 September 1733 – 27 January 1736

Duchess consort of Lorraine
- Tenure: 9 July 1737 – 19 March 1747
- Born: 13 October 1680; Poznań, Poland, Polish–Lithuanian Commonwealth
- Died: 19 March 1747 (aged 66); Lunéville, Duchy of Lorraine, Holy Roman Empire
- Burial: Notre-Dame-de-Bonsecours, Nancy
- Spouse: Stanisław I Leszczyński (m. 1698)
- Issue: Anna Leszczyńska; Marie Leszczyńska
- Noble family: Opaliński
- Father: Jan Karol Opaliński
- Mother: Zofia Czarnkowska

Countess Catherine Opalińska (Polish: Katarzyna Opalińska; 13 October 1680 – 19 March 1747), was by birth member of House of Opaliński, Queen consort and Grand Duchess consort of the Polish–Lithuanian Commonwealth twice and Duchess consort of Lorraine through her marriage with Stanisław I of Poland and Lithuania.

Born into the Polish aristocratic family of Opaliński, Catherine married Stanisłaus Leszczyński in 1698 and six years later he was elected as King of Poland and Grand Duke of Lithuania, due to the support of Charles XII of Sweden where she repaid this favour by favouring Swedish people at court.

In 1708 Catherine was sent to Stettin due to the increasingly unstable political environment and a year later her husband was deposed due to the loss of Swedish dominance in the Commonwealth; and she and her family were exiled to Sweden and were welcomed by the dowager queen, Hedwig and they became popular members of high society. In 1714 they moved to the Swedish ruled town of Zweibrücken where they were supported by the state. However, after the death of Charles in 1718 they moved to Wissembourg where the family were subjected to cramped conditions and because of this Catherine began feeling annoyance towards her husband but in 1725 their only surviving child, Maria, married the King of France, which was massive upgrade in status.

In 1733 Stanisłaus was restored to the Polish-Lithuanian throne during the War of Polish Succession, thanks to French support, but only three years later he abdicated. The peace treaty made Catherine Duchess of Lorraine but her husband had to give up rights to the Polish-Lithuanian throne. She never fully adjusted to life in Lorraine and always longed for Poland-Lithuania but suffered from ill health, which hindered her opportunities to attend court. Upon their arrival Stanisłaus immediately began taking up mistresses which most of the time, came from her household. Catherine died on 19 March 1747 and a grand funeral service was staged by her son-in-law at Notre Dame.

== Biography ==
Catherine was the daughter of the magnate Count Jan Karol Opaliński and his wife, Sofia Anna Czarnkowska. On 10 May 1698 in Kraków she married Stanisław Leszczyński, who became Duke of Lorraine and was, briefly, king of Poland and grand duke of Lithuania (reigned as Stanisław I). In 1699, she gave birth to Anna Leszczyńska, and in 1703, to Marie Leszczyńska, the future spouse of Louis XV of France. Catherine suffered 20 miscarriages between 1700 and 1720.

=== Queen and Grand Duchess ===
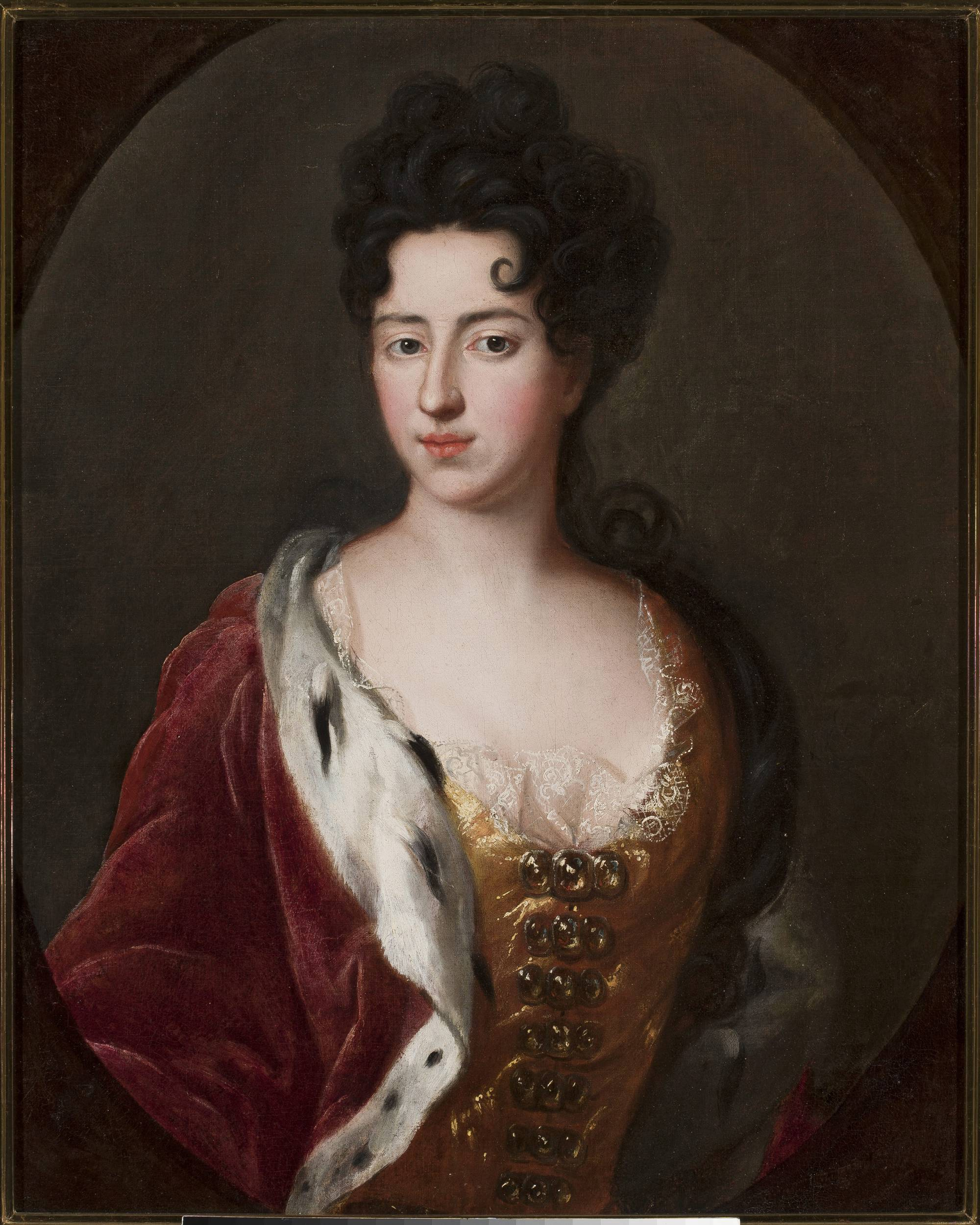
Portrait by Ádám Mányoki, 1700s

Portrait by Johan Starbus, 1712

In 1704, her spouse was elected King of Poland and Grand Duke of Lithuania after having been supported as a candidate by Charles XII of Sweden, who had at the time placed Poland-Lithuania under his occupation. Between November 1704 and July 1705, Charles XII had his headquarters at Rawicz, and the royal couple held court at Rydzyna Castle nearby, where Queen-Grand Duchess Catherine hosted balls and masquerades for the Swedish power holders and welcomed the wives of the Swedish commanders stationed there, such as for example Christina Piper, who visited Carl Piper in Ravicz and were introduced at the Polish court at the same time.

=== Exile ===
Queen-Grand Duchess Catherine was sent by Stanislaw through Gdansk to Stettin in 1708, when the political situation became unstable. In 1709, her spouse was deposed when the Swedish army lost the military upper hand in Poland-Lithuania, and the family was by Charles XII granted refuge in the Swedish city of Kristianstad in Scania, where they arrived in 1711 and stayed for three years.

In Sweden, the family was welcomed by the Queen Dowager Hedwig Eleonora and became popular members of the society life on the estates of the nobility around Kristianstad: one of their acquaintances among the Swedish nobility were Christina Piper, whom they had met in Ravicz in 1705 and with whom they spent several months in Norrköping in the autumn of 1713. In 1712, they also visited Medevi, the spa of the Queen Dowager. In 1714, Charles XII gave them permission to live in the Swedish province of Zweibrücken in Germany, where they were supported by the income of Zweibrücken: they lived there until the death of Charles XII in 1718 Catherine, as well as her daughter Queen Marie, maintained a political correspondence with Margareta Gyllenstierna, the spouse of Arvid Horn, with whom she had made the acquaintance during her stay in Sweden.

After the death of Charles XII in 1718, they lived in Wissembourg in Alsace in France. Their lifestyle in Wissembourg was regarded as very below standard for a royal at that time; they lived in a small house, and could not pay the salary of their small retinue from which a few "served as an apology for a guard of honour", and the jewels of Catherine were reportedly held as security by a moneylender.

Catherine Opalińska was described at this point as economical but bitter, and her relationship with Stanislaw was reportedly not happy at this point as she felt disappointment over the loss of a royal position and her exile and blamed this on the actions of Stanislaw, in which she was joined by her mother-in-law Anna Leszczyńska (1660–1727), who lived with them in exile.

=== France ===
In 1725, her daughter Marie was chosen to be the queen of France, which made Catherine mother-in-law to Louis XV. After the wedding, Catherine and Stanisław resided at the Château de Chambord. They kept their titles and were addressed and treated at the French court as king and queen.

In 1733, Stanislaw again took the throne of Poland-Lithuania during the War of the Polish Succession, making her queen of Poland and grand duchess of Lithuania for the second time. He abdicated the throne in 1736, however. Catherine remained in exile in France during his second reign in Poland-Lithuania.

In 1737, her spouse was granted the Duchy of Lorraine for life, and settled there as Duke of Lorraine. This made Catherine duchess consort of Lorraine, and she joined him there and settled at the Ducal court in Nancy. Until her death, however, she kept her title of Queen and Grand Duchess. Catherine suffered from asthma and heart problems, which served as a reason for not attending ceremonial functions, and she was described as a bigot occupied with her "obsession" with returning to Poland-Lithuania.

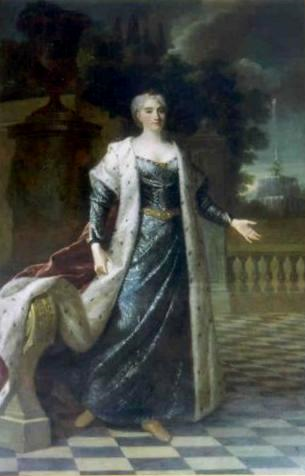
Portrait by Jean-Baptiste Lemercier, 1728

As long as she lived, Stanisław reportedly benefited the Catholic church and the Jesuit order financially. In contrast to Stanisław, Catherine did not adjust to life in France or Lorraine, but felt a certain bitterness over her exile, and continued to long for Poland-Lithuania. Catherine Opalinska was described as homely, pious and charitable, but also as a "dour" personality whom Stanisław regarded to be boring. As soon as they were installed with their court in Lorraine, Stanisław took numerous mistresses, many among her ladies-in-waiting, such as Catherine Ossolińska and Anna Maria Ossolińska, the Première dame d'honneur Marie-Louise de Linanges, Madame de Bassompierre and Madame de Cambres, until from 1745 he had a permanent relationship with Marie Françoise Catherine de Beauvau-Craon, all relationships which Catherine could not prevent.

=== Death ===
When his mother-in-law, the spouse of the dethroned king of Poland and grand duke of Lithuania, died in 1747, Louis XV ordered a commemorative ceremony, in her honour at Notre Dame Cathedral in Paris. The ceremony glorified the deceased who underwent a veritable deification.

Her tomb is in the church of Notre-Dame-de-Bonsecours, in Nancy, next to her husband and the heart of their daughter. Rue Catherine Opalinska in Nancy is named after her.

== Gallery ==
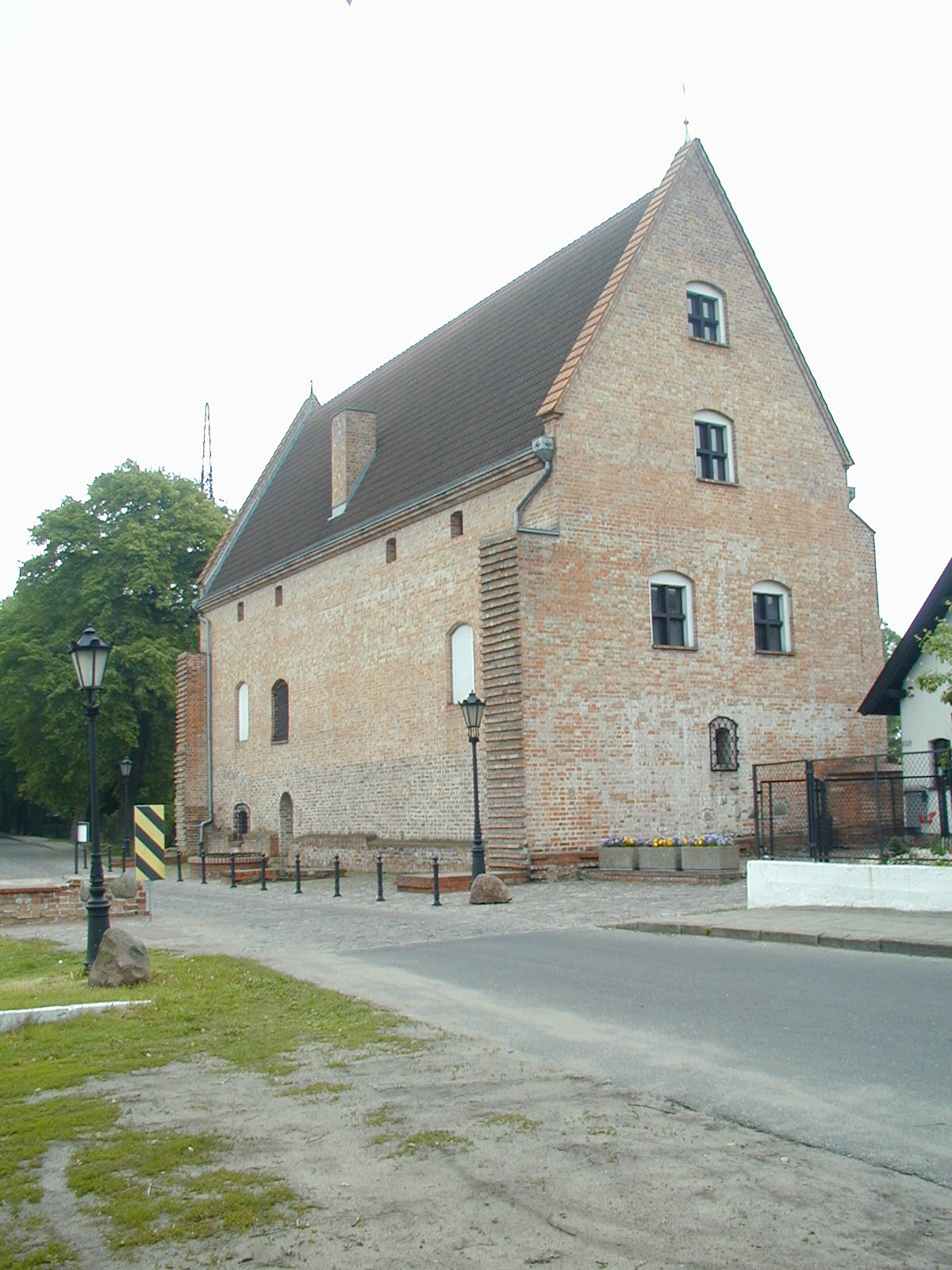
Castle in Sieraków which she inherited in 1695.

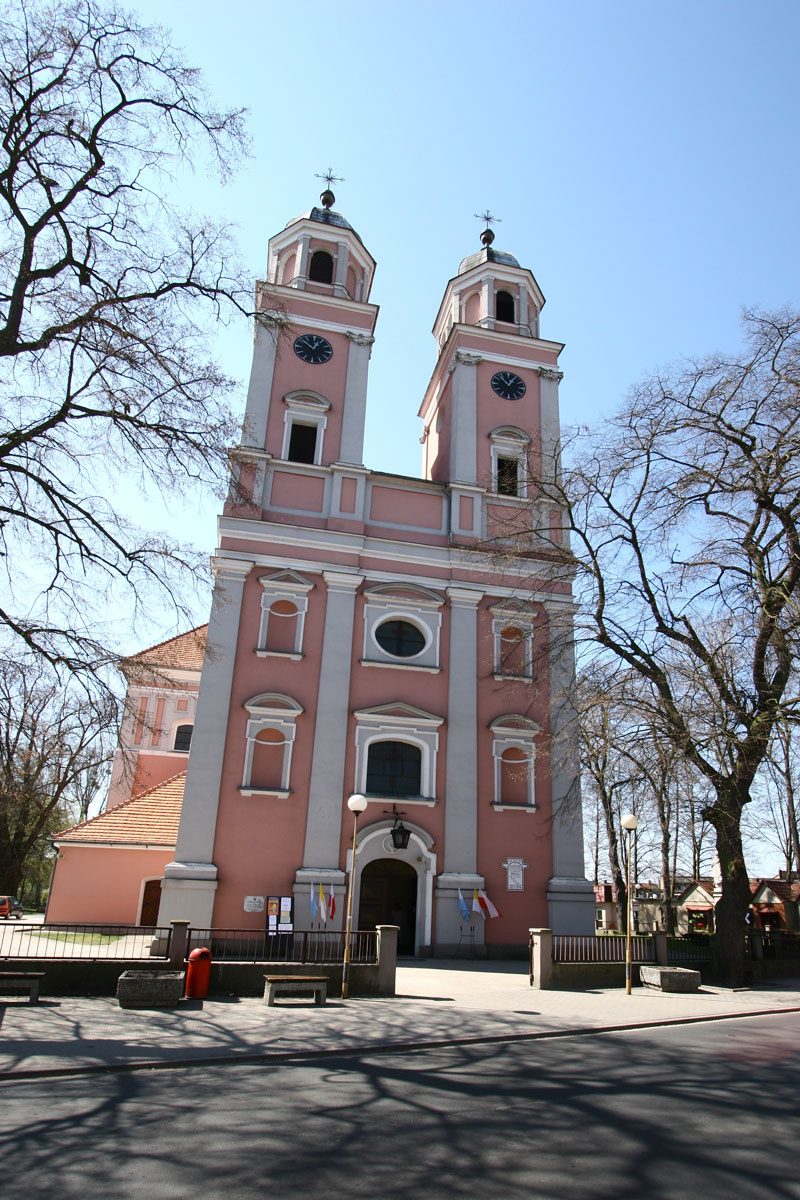
The towers of the church in Sieraków were built in 1740 on her order.

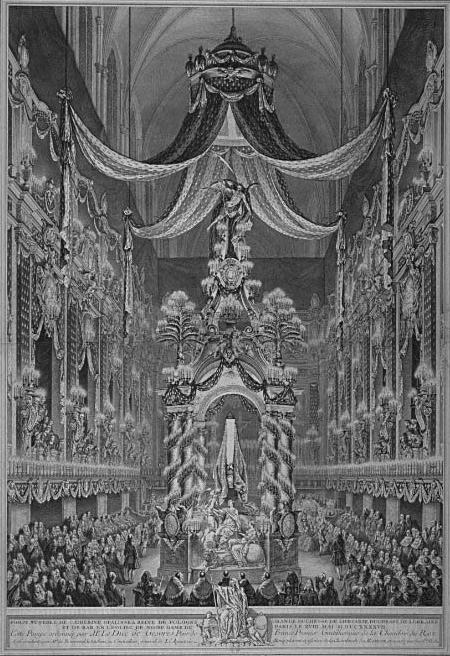
Pompe funèbre for Catherine Opalińska in Notre Dame de Paris.

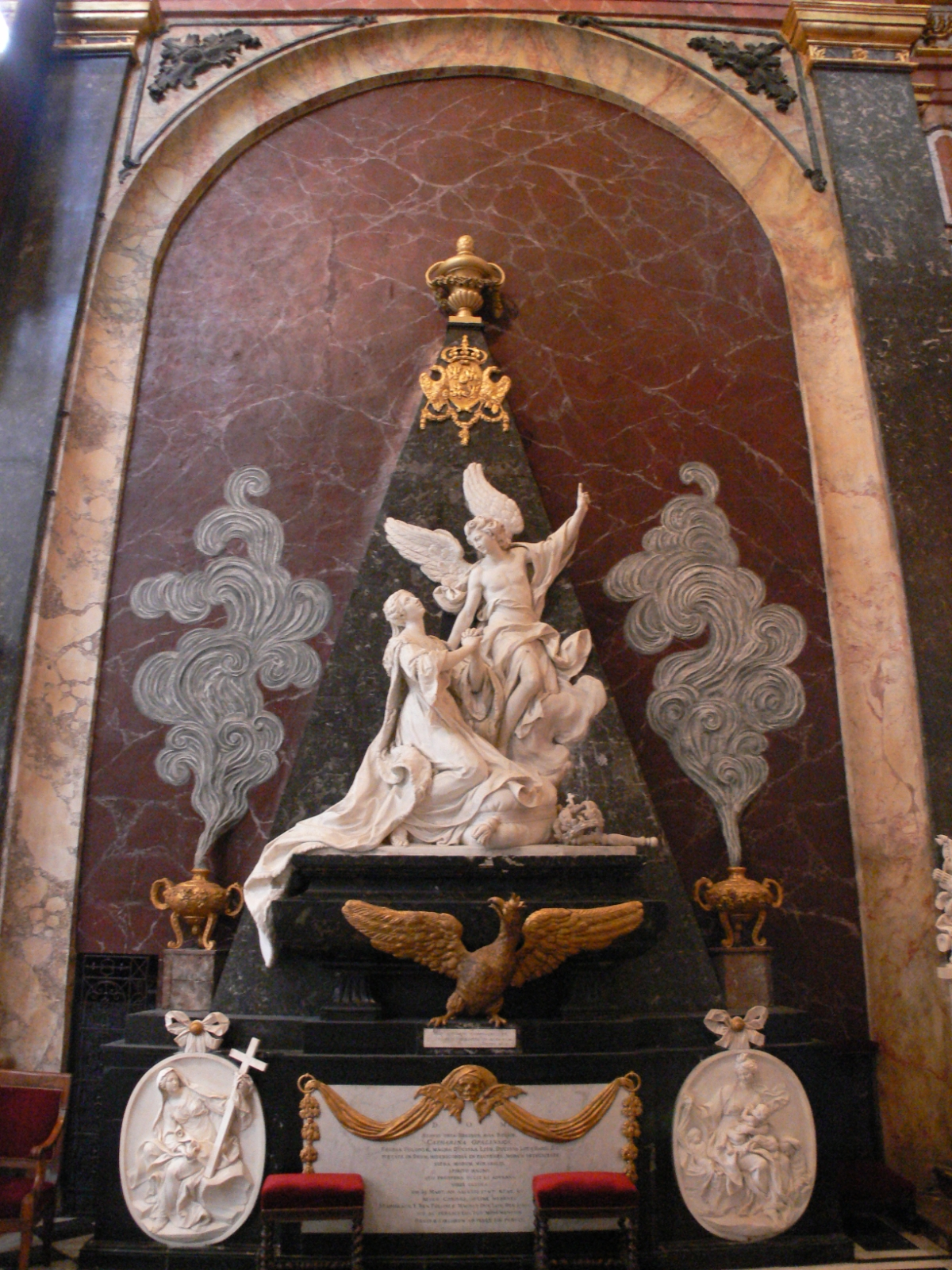
Funeral Monument of Catherine in Nancy

== Ancestors ==
Ancestors of Catherine Opalińska

16. Jan Opaliński
8. Piotr Opaliński, voivode of Poznań
17. Barbara Ostrorožanka Lwowska
4. Krzysztof Opaliński, voivode of Poznań
18. Krzysztof Kostka
9. Zofia Kostka
19. Anna Pilecka
2. Jan Karol Opaliński, castellan of Poznań
20. Wojciech Sedziwój Czarnkowski
10. Adam Sędziwój Czarnkowski, voivode of Łęczyca
21. Jadwiga Sierpska
5. Teresa Konstancja Czarnkowska
22. Rafał Leszczyński
11. Katarzyna Leszczyńska
23. Barbara z Podhajec Wolska
1. Catherine Opalińska
24. Adam Sędziwój Czarnkowski
12. Kazimierz Franciszek Czarnkowski, castellan of Poznań
25. Katarzyna Leszczyńska
6. Adam Uriel Czarnkowski
26. Prince Stanisław Lubomirski
13. Princess Konstancja Lubomirska
27. Princess Zofia Ostrogska
3. Zofia Anna Czarnkowska
28. Wojciech Zaleski
14. Remigian Zaleski, Castellan of Łęczyca
29. N. Beldonska
7. Teresa Zaleska
30. Łukasz Miełžyński
15. Anna Miełżyńska
31. Ełžbieta Czacka

== See also ==
- History of Poland in the Early Modern era (1569–1795)
- Sieraków
- Nancy

Catherine Opalińska House of Opaliński Born: 13 October 1680 Died: 19 March 1747
Royal titles
Preceded by Christiane Eberhardine of Brandenburg-Bayreuth	Queen consort of Poland; Grand Duchess consort of Lithuania; 1705–1708	Succeeded by Christiane Eberhardine of Brandenburg-Bayreuth
Preceded by Christiane Eberhardine of Brandenburg-Bayreuth	Queen consort of Poland; Grand Duchess consort of Lithuania; 1733–1736	Succeeded by Maria Josepha of Austria
Preceded by Maria Theresa of Austria	Duchess consort of Lorraine; 1737–1747	None
