= Tuszyński =

Tuszyński is a Polish surname with Tuszyńska feminine form. Notable people with the surname include:

- Abraham Icek Tuschinski (1886–1942, Polish spelling: Tuszyński), businessman of Jewish Polish descent
- Agata Tuszynska (born 1957), Polish writer, poet and journalist.
- Bogdan Tuszyński (1932–2017), Polish journalist and historian
- Jack Tuszyński (born 1956), Polish oncologist and physicist
- Jan Florian Drobysz Tuszyński (1640–1707) was a Polish nobleman and diarist
- Kamila Tuszyńska, researcher in media studies and comics theoretician.
- Patryk Tuszyński (born 1989), Polish footballer
