= Tuszyńska =

Tuszyńska is a surname. Notable people with the surname include:

- Agata Tuszyńska (born 1957), Polish writer;
- Kamila Tuszyńska, Polish academic.
