= Kędzierski =

Nałęcz coat of arms, used by some of Kędzierski family

Kędzierski (feminine: Kędzierska, plural: Kędzierscy) is a Polish surname. It may be transliterated as: Kedzierski, Kedzierska. Notable people with the surname include:

- Aleksandra Kędzierska (born 1984), Polish-French dancer and actress
- Anna Kędzierska (1932–2020), Polish economist and politician
- Apoloniusz Kędzierski (1861–1939), Polish painter
- Celina Kędzierska, Polish Righteous Among the Nations
- Johanna Kedzierski (born 1984), German sprinter
- Katherine Kedzierska, Polish Australian immunologist
- Karolina Kedzierska (born 1987), Swedish taekwondo practitioner
- Marek Kędzierski (born 1953), Polish writer
- Michał Kędzierski (born 1994), Polish volleyball player

== See also ==
- Kendziorski
