= Anna Leszczyńska =

Anna Leszczyńska may refer to:

- Anna Leszczyńska (1660–1727), Polish noble lady and the mother of King of Poland Stanisław I Leszczyński
- Anna Leszczyńska (1699–1717), eldest daughter of King Stanisław Leszczyński of Poland (later Duke of Lorraine) and Katarzyna Opalińsk
- Anna Leszczyńska-Łazor (born 1971), Polish athlete
