= Nałęcz coat of arms =

Polish coat of arms

Nałęcz
- Battle cry: Nałęcz, Nałęcz Jezioro
- Alternative names: Choczennica, Łęczuch, Nalancz, Nalencz, Nałęczyta, Nałonie, Pomłość, Toczennica,
- Earliest mention: 1293 (seal), 1398 (record)
- Cities: Czarnków, Ostroróg
- Gminas: Gmina Babiak, Gmina Odrzywół
- Families: 933 names A Abram, Andrzejewski, Andrzejowski. B Babecki, Baczkowski, Badoracki, Baranowski, Batycki, Bączkowski, Bąklewski, Beklewski, Bendoński, Benglewski, Benklewski, Berski, Berzbortkiewicz, Bethune, Będoński, Bęklewski, Białłyszewski, Białowieski, Bielakowski, Bielański, Bielejewski, Bierwecki, Bierzwięcki, Bierżewicki, Bierżewski, Blanday, Błażejewicz, Błędostowski, Błędowski, Błogowski, Błoniewski, Błoniowski, Błoński, Bobolecki, Bobolicki, Bobrowski, Bocianowski, Bodzisławski, Bogdaszewski, Boguchwał, Bohdaszewski, Bojarski, Bolochowiec, Bołchowiec, Bołkoński, Bołochowiec, Bonczakowski, Bonisko, Boniuszko, Borkowski, Borodziński, Borsa, Borsza, Borszowicz, Bortkiewicz, Bortkowicz, Bortkowski, Borzestowski, Borzkowski, Boszkowski, Bratkowski, Brodzki, Brudzewski, Bryndzanacki, Brzański, Brzozdowski, Buczek, Buczko, Bukojemski, Buza, Bużański, Bzowski. C Cal, Ciborski, Charbicki, Chawejłowicz, Chełmicki, Chełmiński, Cherubinowicz, Chinowski, Chlebicki, Chłembowski, Chłębowski, Chłopecki, Chmar, Chmara, Chmiel, Chodakowski, Chomiąski, Chomięcki, Chrepkowicz, Chwalibogowski, Chwat, Chynowski, Cichocki, Ciechanowicz, Ciechocki, Ciechowski, Ciepieński, Ciepiński, Conradi, Cwiklicz, Czasoński, Czech, Czeperowski, Czepiński, Czerniewicz, Czołpiński. Ć Ćmachowski, Ćwikliński. D Dahlke, Dalkiewicz, Darowski, Dawrowski, Dąbrowski, Debrzyński, Derszniak, Dersztorff, Ditrich, Dłuski, Dmowski, Dobaczewski, Dobrogost, Dobrosławski, Dobrowolski, Dobrzyński, Dołągowski, Dołongowski, Domasławski, Domasłowski, Domaszewski, Domosławski, Domysławski, Donajewski, Donajski, Dorohanicki, Dowgiał, Dowolg, Dowolgo, Drochiński, Drociński, Drohiciński, Drohiczański, Drohiczyński, Drohiński, Droyczewski, Drużbicki, Drużbiński, Drzewiecki, Dubieniecki, Duszyński, Dworczyński, Dwornicki, Dwornik, Dybczyński, Dybowski, Dybek, Dybrzyński, Dylądowski, Dylągowski, Dylengowski, Dylkiewicz, Dzbański, Dzbeński, Dzbiński, Dziećmiarowski, Dzierżykraj, Dziewierzewski, Dziewoński, Dzułay, Dzwonowski, Dżugay, Dżułat, Dżułay. E Eńko. F Falcz, Fąferek, Felner, Felnerowicz, Filicki, Filipecki, Fortuna. G Gajewski, Gartkiewicz, Garwoliński, Gasperowicz, Gawarecki, Gawin, Gawłowski, Gembicki, Gębicki, Gigański, Gilbaszewski, Gimbut, Gimbutowicz, Ginalski, Ginbut, Giżycki, Gliszczyński, Gładki, Głowacz, Głuchowski, Głuzicki, Gnuszyński, Goleszewski, Golian, Golikowski, Goloszewski, Gołębski, Gołoszewski, Gorawski, Gorski, Gorzeński, Gorzycki, Gorzyński, Gosławski, Gostomski, Goszczyński, Gowarecki, Gozdzikowski, Gożewski, Górecki, Górka, Górski, Grabski, Graff, Grąbczewski, Grochala, Grocholski, Grochowalski, Grochowolski, Grodzicki, Grodziecki, Grodziński, Grot, Grzejewski, Grzymisławski, Gulczewski, Gurski. H Hanowiecki, Herstopski, Hersztopski, Hłodki, Holibowski, Horaszkiewicz, Horoszkiewicz, Horoszowski, Horski, Horyszewski, Horyszowski, Horztopski, Howryłowski, Hoztopski, Hryniewicz, Hulewicz, Huściłło, Huściło. I Idzelewicz, Idzellewicz, Idzikowski, Ilikowski, Iłłowiecki, Iłowicki, Iłowiecki, Imbir, Imbram, Imbramowicz, Imram. J Jabłonowski, Jakusz, Jałomowicz, Jałowicki, Jałowiecki, Jamont, Jamontt, Janczewski, Janicki, Janowski, Januszewicz, Jarczewski, Jarczowski, Jargocki, Jargoski, Jarzymski, Jasielski, Jasieński, Jawecki, Jawiecki, Jeleniewski, Jeleński, Jeliński, Jełowicz, Jeńkowicz, Jezierski, Jeżewski, Jeżowski, Jędrychowski, Jędrzejewski, Jędrzejowski, Jędrzychowski, Jędrzyjewski, Jędrzyjowski, Jocher, Jodkowski, Jodłowski, Jotkowski, Juckiewicz, Judkowski. K Kaczan, Kaczanowski, Kaczkowski, Kaczyński, Kagan, Kaliński, Kaliszewski, Kaliszkowski, Kalitowski, Kalitwiński, Kamieński, Kampiery, Kaniewiecki, Kaniewski, Kaniowski, Karczewski, Kardaszewski, Karkuszka, Karkuszko, Karłowicz, Karpowicz, Karpowski, Kasinowski, Kawałowski, Kazanecki, Kazański, Każdajlewicz, Kąsinowski, Kembłowski, Kębłowski, Kędzierski, Kęsicki, Kęszycki, Kibeleński, Kielbicki, Kiełbasa, Kietułk, Kissiński, Kiszewski, Klonowski, Kłobicki, Kłobocki, Kłokocki, Kłokowski, Kłonowski, Kobelecki, Kobelnicki, Kobierzycki, Kobylnicki, Kobyłecki, Kocieło, Koczan, Koczanowicz, Koczanowski, Koleński, Koliński, Komornicki, Komorowski, Koniewski, Konradi, Konrady, Kopczyński, Korkuć, Kormanowicz, Koroza, Korycieński, Korzanowicz, Korzenicki, Korzeniecki, Korzeniewski, Korzeniowski, Korzeń, Korzyniewski, Kosinowski, Kostecki, Koszczyński, Kozłowski, Koźmian, Kraskowski, Krasowski, Krassowski, Kraszkowski, Krazan, Krempski, Krępski, Kruchowski, Kruszkowski, Kublewski, Kucewicz, Kuczan, Kulikowski, Kulinkowski, Kunowski, Kupraszewicz, Kurkuć, Kuszycki, Kwaśniewski, Kwiatkowski, Kwieciński. L Laband, Labanda, Lachowski, Laszowski, Lauterbach, Lazański, Lebiedziejewski, Ledzeński, Lekczyński, Leński, Lesenko, Lesicki, Lesiecki, Leszczkowski, Leszczyński, Leszkiewicz, Lewandowski, Lewicki, Lewiecki, Lezeński, Leziński, Leźnicki, Leżański, Leżeński, Leżnicki, Leżyński, Lęcki, Lędzki, Lipka, Lippi, Lisieński, Lisowski, Liszak, Lubieński, Lubiński, Lubsiński, Ludicki, Ludzicki, Ludziski, Lwowski. Ł Łagiewnicki, Łakieński, Łakiński, Łakucewicz, Łaszewski, Łaszowski, Łaściszewski, Ławicki, Ławiecki, Łazański, Łażyński, Łączyński, Łąka, Łąkowski, Łążyński, Łekieński, Łęcki, Łędzki, Łękiński, Łękowski, Łokucewicz, Łomnicki, Łoniecki, Łoniewski, Łopacieński, Łopaciński, Łowecki, Łowęcki, Łowicki, Łowiecki, Łowiński, Łubkowski, Łubowski, Łukomski, Łust, Łusta, Łuszczewski, Łuszczowski. M Maciurkowski, Mackiewicz, Majewski, Malicki, Malicz, Maliski, Malski, Małachowski, Małyski, Manikowski, Mańkowski, Marcinkiewicz, Marcinkowski, Markowski, Masłowski, Mazurowski, Meszyński, Męszyński, Michalecki, Michalicki, Mickiewicz, Mićkiewicz, Mierzyński, Miesłowicki, Mieszyński, Milanowski, Milkiewicz, Miłachowski, Mitraszewski, Mniski, Modlski, Mogniński, Molski, Monczyński, Montrym, Morawicki, Moszczenicki, Moszczeński, Moszczyński, Moszeński, Moszyński, Mrocki, Mroczkowski, Mrozowski, Mściwojewski, Mściwujewski, Mukiewicz, Mulewski, Muszyński, Mysłowski. N Nakielski, Nalaskowski, Nałęcz, Nagórski, Napachański, Napachowski, Nasadowski, Nicki, Niedziałkowski, Niemierza, Niemira, Niemirowicz, Niemiryc, Niemirycz, Niemirzyc, Nienałtowski, Nienieński, Nieniewski, Nieniński, Niepokojczycki, Niesiołowski, Niesłuchowski, Nieświastowski, Nieświatowski, Niewiejski, Niewiński, Ninieński, Niniewski, Niwiński, Nojewski, Norejkowicz, Nosadowski, Nowodworski, Nowokuński, Nowopolski, Nowosielecki, Nowosielski. O Obiezierski, Objezierski, Obolewicz, Oborowski, Oborski, Obrzycki, Ochmanowicz, Odachowski, Odechowski, Odrzywolski, Okoński, Okuliński, Okuński, Olkiewicz, Orchowski, Orochowski, Oryszowski, Osiński, Ostropolski, Ostroróg, Ostrowski, Oszczonowski, Ośmiałowski, Ośniałowski, Ożarowski. P Padarzewski, Padaszewski, Palenowski, Pancerski, Papuskowski, Parczewski, Parol, Parskliński, Parszchliński, Parszewski, Parul, Parzkliński, Paszkiewicz, Pawłowski, Perowski, Petraszkiewicz, Petrykowski, Pęcherzewski, Pęchorzewski, Piasecki, Piegłowski, Piergowski, Pierski, Pietraszkiewicz, Pietraszko, Pietrusiński, Pigłowski, Pilawski, Pilichowski, Piorowski, Piotrowicz, Piotrowin, Pirgocki, Pirogowski, Pirski, Piruski, Pniewski, Pniowski, Podkocki, Podlecki, Podleski, Podłęcki, Podolak, Podolski, Poklękowski, Polaski, Poleński, Poluchowicz, Połaski, Poławski, Połazki, Popiel, Popielski, Popowski, Poradziński, Porzyński, Post, Posth, Potarzycki, Prusimski, Pruszyński, Przedwieczorski, Przedzyński, Przetecki, Przetocki, Przewoski, Przewóski, Przewuski, Przędzielski, Przędzyński, Przyborowski, Przyborów, Przybysławski, Przyłęcki, Przywieczerzyński, Pulnarowicz, Pułczyński, Putkowski, Pycz, Pyczyński. R Raczyński, Radaczyński, Radzicki, Ragowski, Rajewski, Ramatowski, Regacki, Regmont, Regmunt, Rogajski, Rogalski, Rogaski, Rogiński, Rokitnicki, Rokszycki, Rostworowski, Rozwarowski, Rucieński, Ruciński, Rudnicki, Rudziewicz, Rulikowski, Rumbo, Rumbowicz, Rumowski, Runowski, Rusian, Rusiłowicz, Russian, Russyan, Rychłowski. S Sachno, Sachnowski, Sadokierski, Sadomski, Sadowski, Sadzyński, Samacki, Sarbski, Sempelborski, Sernicki, Setnicki, Sędywój, Sępiński, Sianożęcki, Siedlecki, Sieprawski, Sierakowski, Sieroszewski, Sierszewski, Sierzchowski, Sietnicki, Sirochowski, Sitański, Sitnicki, Skaławski, Skałecki, Skałocki, Skałowski, Skaryszewski, Skomorowski, Skoś, Skórski, Skrobaczewski, Skubaczewski, Skubaszewski, Sławieński, Sławiński, Słonkowski, Sobieszczański, Sobocki, Socha, Sokolnicki, Sosnowski, Soszyński, Sozański, Sożański, Stadnikiewicz, Staniszewski, Stanowski, Stańczyk, Starczewski, Starogrodzki, Starorypiński, Stasiewicz, Stawiarski, Stempniewicz, Slizewicz, Stromiło, Strumiłło, Strumiłowski, Struś-Kamyszkowski, Sudmont, Sulicki, Suradowski, Suski, Suyski, Swarczewski, Swaryczewski, Swaryszewski, Saryszowski, Swarzyszewski, Sypkowski, Szadokierski, Szadokretski, Szamota, Szamotulski, Szamotuła, Szarogrodzki, Szczekocki, Szczukocki, Szemborski, Szepetowski, Szlagowski, Szubiński, Szujski, Szuyski, Szwaryszowski, Szwarzyszowski, Szyberna, Szymberski, Szymborski, Szymbowski, Szyprowski. Ś Ślęski, Śmietanka, Śnieszek, Śnieszko, Świdwa, Świeprawski. T Taplicki, Tarajewski, Tarnawski, Tarnowski, Tessarowski, Tholibowski, Timiński, Tłukomski, Tokbowski, Tolbowski, Tolibowski, Tomasz, Tomkiewicz, Topalski, Toplicki, Topolski, Trawiński, Trzebicki, Trzeyeński, Trzyeński, Tulibowski, Tupalski, Tupolski, Tuskiewicz, Tuszyński, Tymiński, Tynicki, Tyrzyński. U Udanowski, Udowicz, Udrycki, Udrzycki, Udzielski, Uhrynowski, Uszak. W Wakulewicz, Wardęski, Warszowski, Watkiewicz, Watkowski, Wąsowski, Wąssowski, Wątkiewicz, Wątkowski, Westchowski, Węgier, Wielądka, Wielądko, Wielątkowski, Wielżyno, Wielżyński, Wiencewicz, Wienicki, Wieniecki, Wiennicki, Wierszowski, Wierzbicki, Wierzbiński, Wierzbowski, Wierzchaczewski, Wierzuchowski, Wikowski, Wilga, Wilk, Wilkczycki, Wilkowski, Wilksicki, Wilksycki, Wilkszycki, Wilżyński, Winiecki, Winnicki, Wir, Wisłogórski, Wisłogurski, Witowski, Włyński, Wodecki, Wojchowski, Wojciechowski, Wojnicz, Wojniesławski, Wojno, Wojnowicz, Wojnowski, Wojsławski, Wolański, Wolski, Wołucki, Wołudzki, Woyno, Wójcikowski, Wstowski, Wujcikowski, Wysocki. Z Zabicki, Zagajewski, Zajączkowski, Zaklikowski, Zakrzewski, Zanszyk, Zarczycki, Zarczyński, Zarszyniski, Zarszyński, Zasułtowski, Zbański, Zbąski, Zborzeński, Zdanowski, Zgliczyński, Złotopolski, Zorawski, Zrzylski, Zygmuntowicz. Ż Żabicki, Żarcicki, Żarczyński, Żebrowski, Żołądkiewicz, Żołądkowski, Żołątkowski, Żołędkowski, Żorawski, Żórawski, Żurawski, Żwanowski, Żydowski.

Nałęcz (Polish pronunciation: [ˈnawɛnt͡ʂ]) is a Polish coat of arms. It was used by associated szlachta families in the Kingdom of Poland (see Kingdom of Poland (1320–1385), and Kingdom of Poland (1385–1569)) and the Polish–Lithuanian Commonwealth (1569–1795).

== History ==
Nałęcz is a Polish coat of arms from the 12th century (like the Abdank, Leliwa, Radwan, and Bogorya coats of arms) that represented unity and harmony. It was used by the Gembiccy, Ostrorogowie, Szamotulscy, Chełmicki, Czarnkowscy, Slizewicz, Raczyńscy, Raczkowski, Dworniccy, Sadowski, Łowińscy, Grąbczewscy and other families. It is traditionally described as a silver shawl, tied, on a red background. Most versions had the shawl tied downwards; some were tied upwards. Some families showed the woman at the top blindfolded. Earlier versions and some modern ones depict the shawl untied. The shawl is similar in shape to the Teutonic image of Rune Othila, the Rune of a Fatherland.

The Nałęcz arms were initially connected with Greater Poland. The Nałęcze were accused of murdering Przemysł II in 1296. They also allied with Brandenburg against Władysław I Łokietek, and after the death of Louis I of Hungary waged war against the Grzymalites, attempting to put Ziemowit III of Masovia forcibly on the throne of Poland.

The best-known Poles who bore these arms were Joseph Conrad (Korzeniowski) and Sędziwój Ostroróg. A Nałęcz relief is on the Guard House building in Poznań.

== Blazon ==
In heraldic English, the shield may be blazoned: Gules the Nałęcz shawl circled and knotted Argent.

== Notable bearers ==
Notable bearers of this coat of arms have included:

- Józef Karol Konrad Chełmicki
- Kazimierz Franciszek Czarnkowski
- Adam Sędziwój Czarnkowski
- Benedykt Dybowski
- Apollo Korzeniowski
- Joseph Conrad Korzeniowski
- House of Małachowski
  - Jacek Małachowski
  - Stanisław Małachowski
- Fryderyk Józef Moszyński
- Mikołaj Ostroróg
- Edward Raczyński (1786–1845)
- Edward Aleksander Raczyński
- Edward Bernard Raczyński
- Józef Sosnowski

== Gallery ==
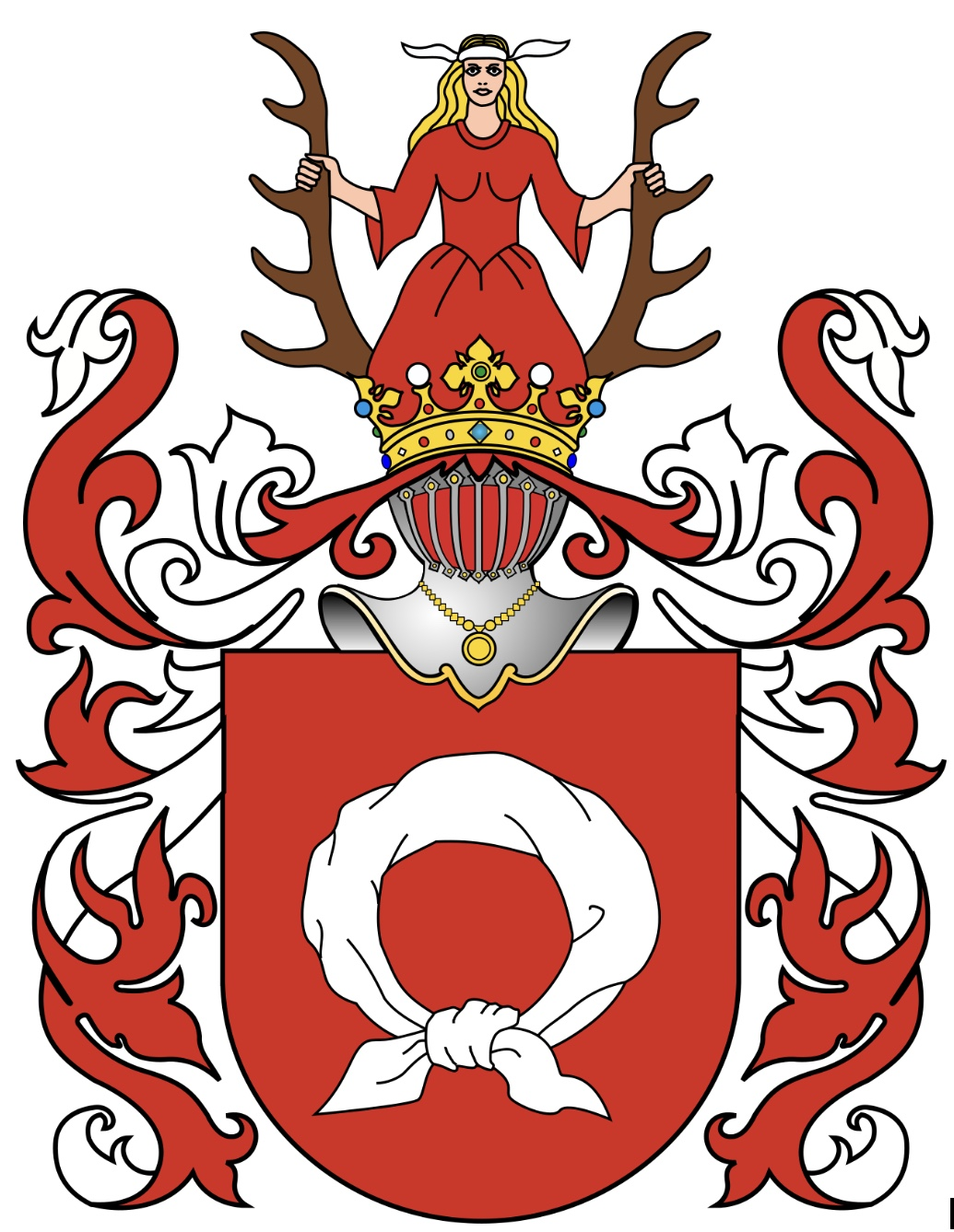
coat of arms of the Slizewicz family

Standard variations

Coat of arms of Stanisław Bartoloni, 1589

Coat of arms of Dybowski family

Coat of arms of Felsztyński family (1780)

Coat of arms of Gostomski family

Coat of arms of Korth vel Kort family

Coat of arms of Kunowski family

Coat of arms of Mikołaj Łączyński, 1580

Coat of arms of Dobrogost Miliński, 1570

Coat of arms of Gołyszewski and Morawski family

Nałęcz II

Nałęcz III

Nałęcz IV

Nałęcz V

Coat of arms of Andrzej Strykowski, 1565 and Jan and Stanisła Niczów, 1578

Coat of arms of Nowosielecki family

Coat of arms of Odachowski family

Coat of arms of Counts Ostroróg

Coat of arms of Tomasz Pirawski, 17th century

Coat of arms of Raczkowski family, 1591

Coat of arms of Rostworowski family

Coat of arms of Szawłowski family

Coat of arms of Tański family

Coat of arms of Jan Węgier, 1613

Coat of arms of Woropaj family

Coat of arms of Maciej Żądłowski, 1565

Coat of arms of Żychliński family.

Coat of arms of Morawski family.

Aristocratic variations

Coat of arms of Counts Gorzeński family

Coat of arms of Counts Kęszycki, Łączyński and Małachowski

Coat of arms of Count Stanisław Małachowski

Coat of arms of Counts Moszczeński

Coat of arms of Counts Moszczeński.

Coat of arms of Counts Ostrorog

Coat of arms of Counts Raczyński

Other

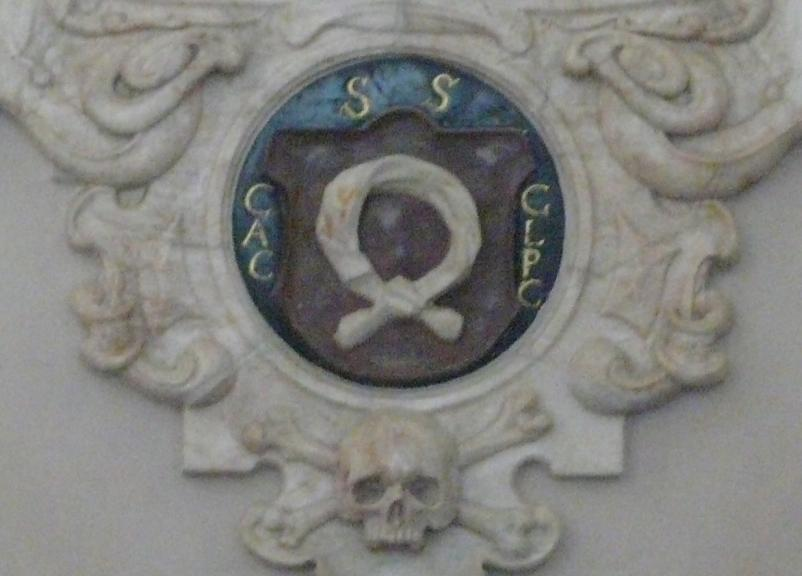
Nałecz coat of arms of Stanisław Slawieński in his burial monument inside Gniezno Cathedral (c. 1661)

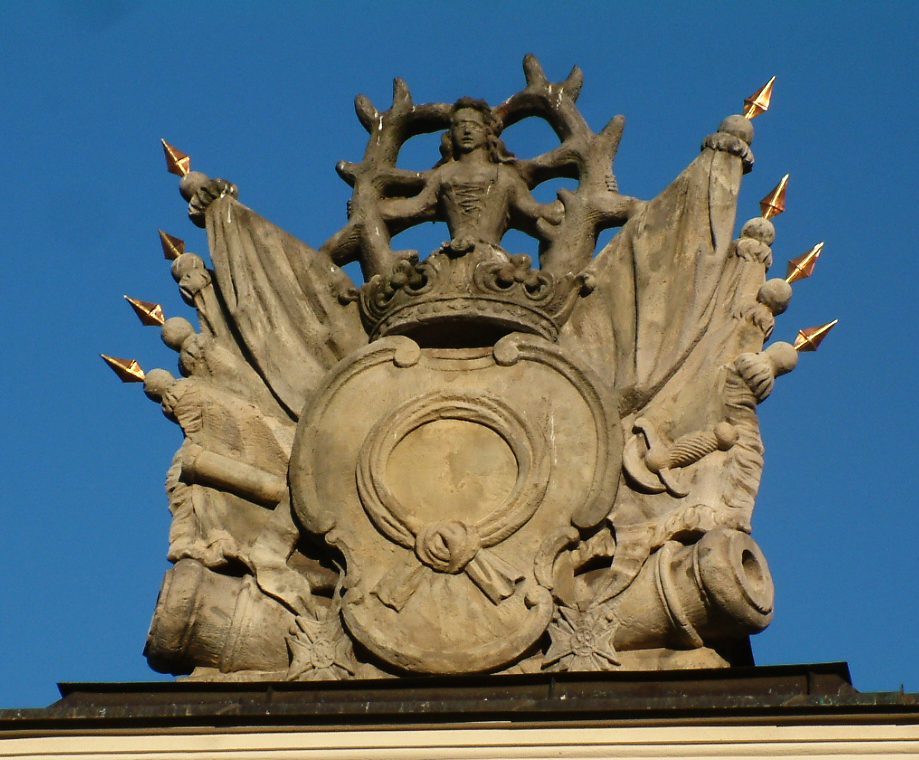
Nałęcz coat of arms of Kazimierz Raczyński, detail of Guardhouse in Poznań

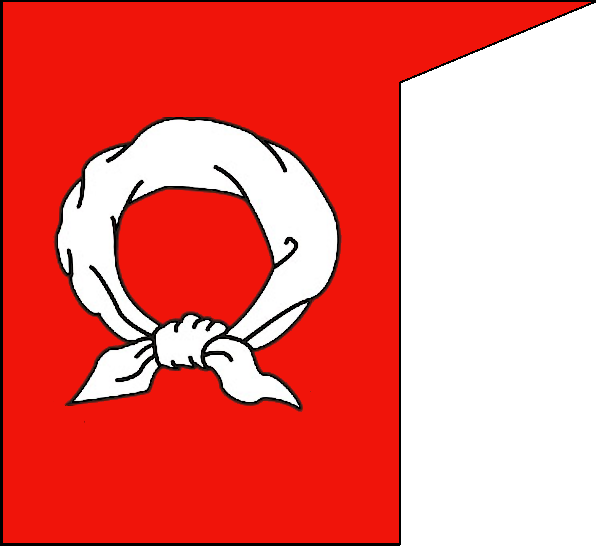
The Nałęcz Flag

Medieval version of Nałecz coat of arms according to the Gelre Armorial

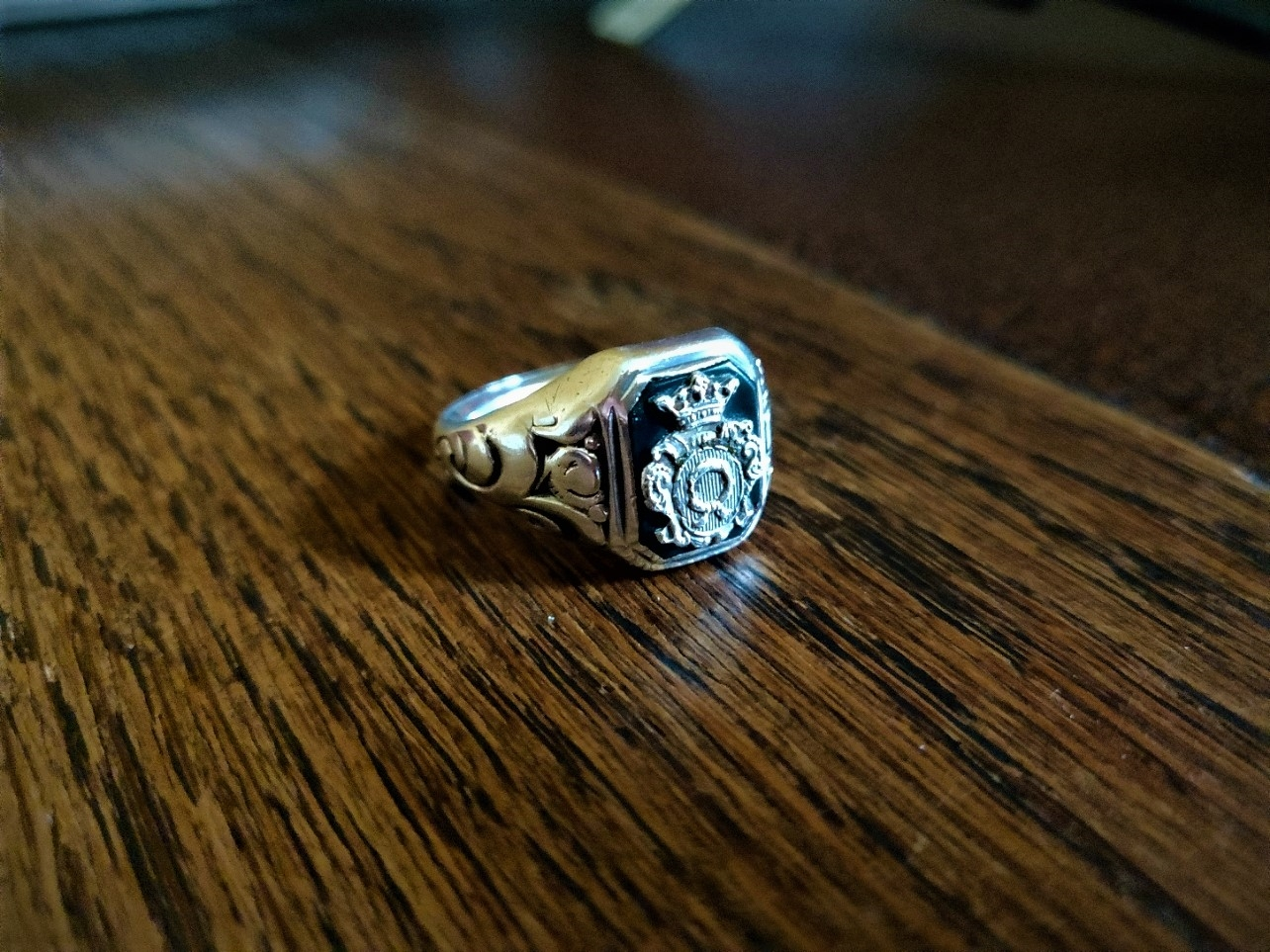
A silver ring belonging to the Kalitvianski (Kalitwiński) family with an embossed Nałęcz coat of arms, manufactured in the XIX century in the Russian Empire.

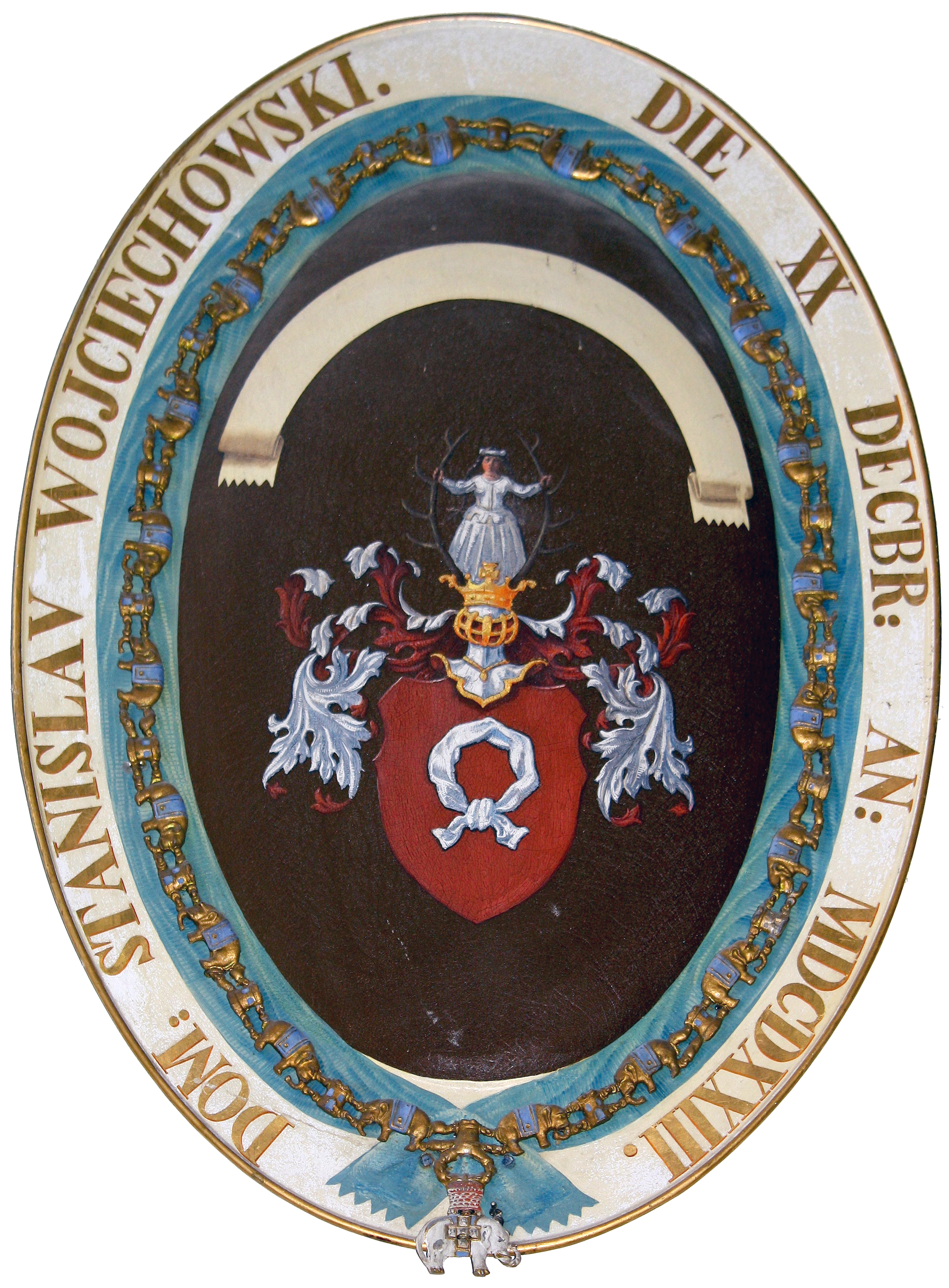
Coat of arms of the Polish President Stanisław Wojciechowski as Knight of the Order of the Elephant (1923). The Chapel of the Order of the Elephant, Frederiksborg Castle, Hillerød (Denmark).

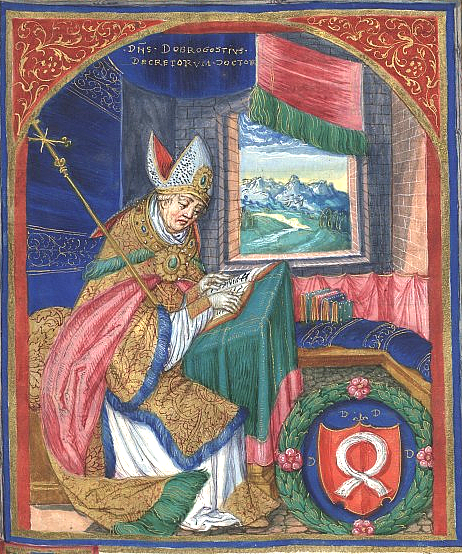
Dobrogost z Nowego Dworu, Archbishop of Gniezno

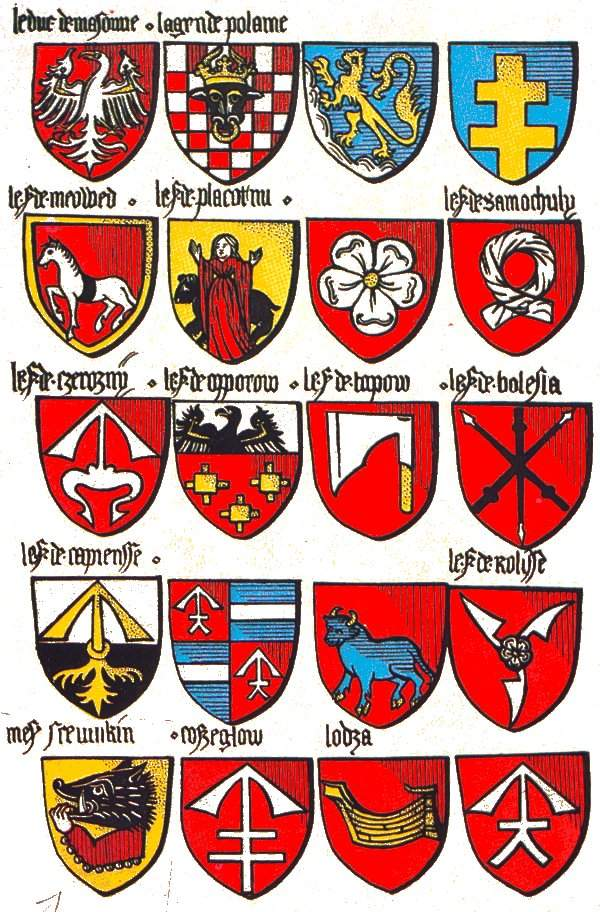
Armorial Toison d'Or

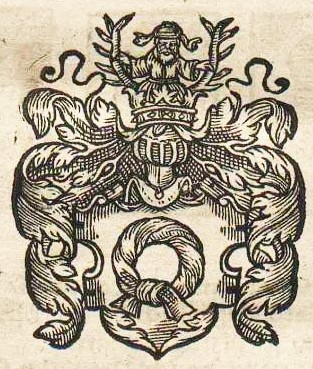
Nałęcz coat of arms by Bartłomiej Paprocki published in "Gniazdo cnoty.." (1578)

== See also ==
- Polish heraldry
- Heraldic family
- List of Polish nobility coats of arms

== Bibliography ==
- Juliusz Karol Ostrowski: Księga herbowa rodów polskich. T. 1-2. Warszawa: Główny skład księgarnia antykwarska B. Bolcewicza, 1897.
- Adam Boniecki: Herbarz polski. Warszawa: skł. gł. Gebethner i Wolff, 1899.
- Franciszek Piekosiński: Heraldyka polska wieków średnich. Kraków: Akademia Umiejętności, 1899.
- Józef Szymański: Herbarz średniowiecznego rycerstwa polskiego. Warszawa: PWN, 1993. ISBN 83-01-09797-3.
- Anna Wajs: Materiały genealogiczne, nobilitacje, indygenaty w zbiorach Archiwum Głównego Akt Dawnych w Warszawie. Warszawa: DiG, 2001. ISBN 83-7181-173-X.
- Alfred Znamierowski: Herbarz rodowy. Warszawa: Świat Książki, 2004. ISBN 83-7391-166-9.
- Tadeusz Gajl: Herbarz polski od średniowiecza do XX wieku : ponad 4500 herbów szlacheckich 37 tysięcy nazwisk 55 tysięcy rodów. L&L, 2007. ISBN 978-83-60597-10-1.
- Tadeusz Gajl: Nowy herbarz polski. 5 000 herbow + 50 000 nazwisk. Gdański Kantor Wydawniczy, 2016. ISBN 978-83-65387-05-9
- Schlesinger, Edward Ondřej von: Die Wappengenossenschaft Nałęcz und deren Abwandlungen mit lateinisch-kyrillischen und kyrillisch-lateinischen Konvertierungstabelle der Geschlechternamen, in: Schriftenreihe für angewandte Sozialgeschichte StudIaS - Heraldik, Serie der Wappengenossenschaften der Res Publica, Band 1, Eitorf 2025, VI+266 Seiten, (germ.), ISBN 9 783819 299124.
