= Račkauskas =

- Lithuanian surname
- m.: Račkauskas
- f.: (unmarried): Račkauskaitė
- f.: (married): Račkauskienė

Račkauskas is a Lithuanian-language surname, Lithuanized from the Slavic patronymic counterparts, Polish Raczkowski, Russian Rachkovsky/Rachkovskiy (Рачковский), and Belarusian Račkoŭski (Рачкоўскі).

Notable people with the surname include:

- Andrius Račkauskas, Lithuanian handball player
- Arimantas Račkauskas, mayor of Kaunas, 1992–1995
- Karolis Račkauskas-Vairas (1882 – 1970) Lithuanian writer, journalist, translator, cultural activist, and diplomat
- Rytis Mykolas Račkauskas, Lithuanian politician and a former Mayor of Panevėžys
