= Jan Karol Opaliński =

Polish starost

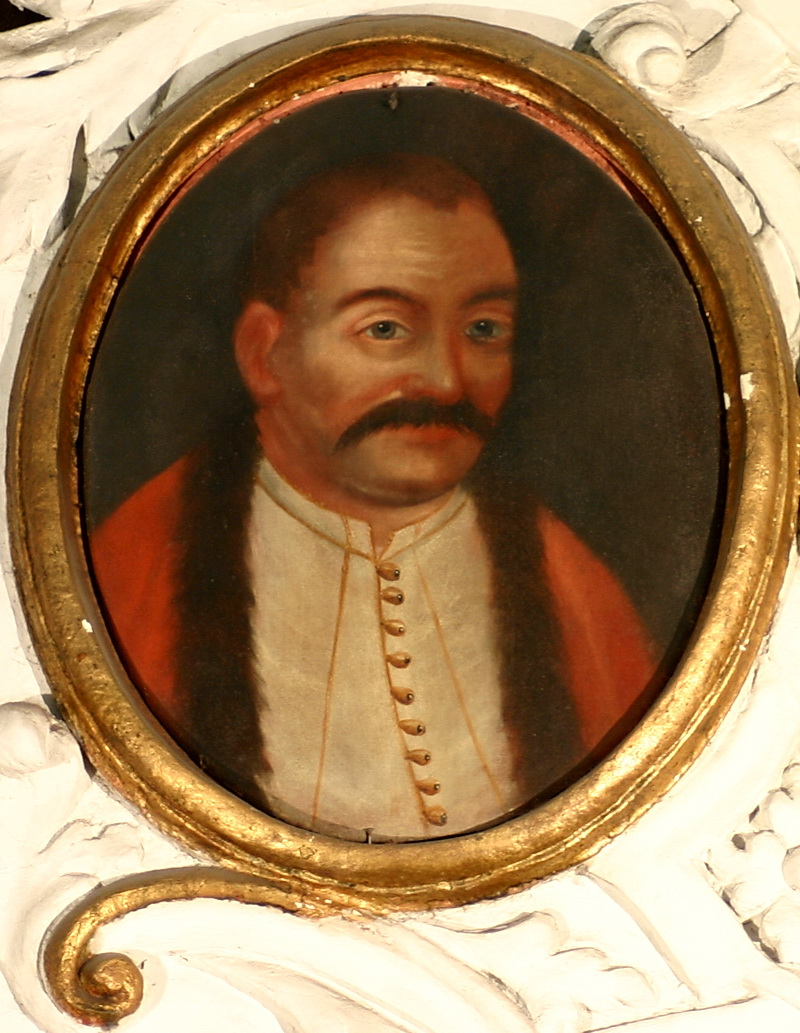
- Jan Karol Opaliński in Sierakow Church
- Born: 1642
- Died: 26 March 1695 (aged 52–53)
- Noble family: Opaliński
- Spouse: Zofia Anna Czarnkowska
- Issue: Katarzyna, Queen of Poland
- Father: Krzysztof Opaliński
- Mother: Teresa Konstancya Czarnkowska

Jan Karol Opaliński (1642 – 26 March 1695), known as Henri Opaliński in France, was a Polish starost and kasztelan of Poznań. He was the son of Krzysztof Opaliński and Teresa Konstancya Czarnkowska.

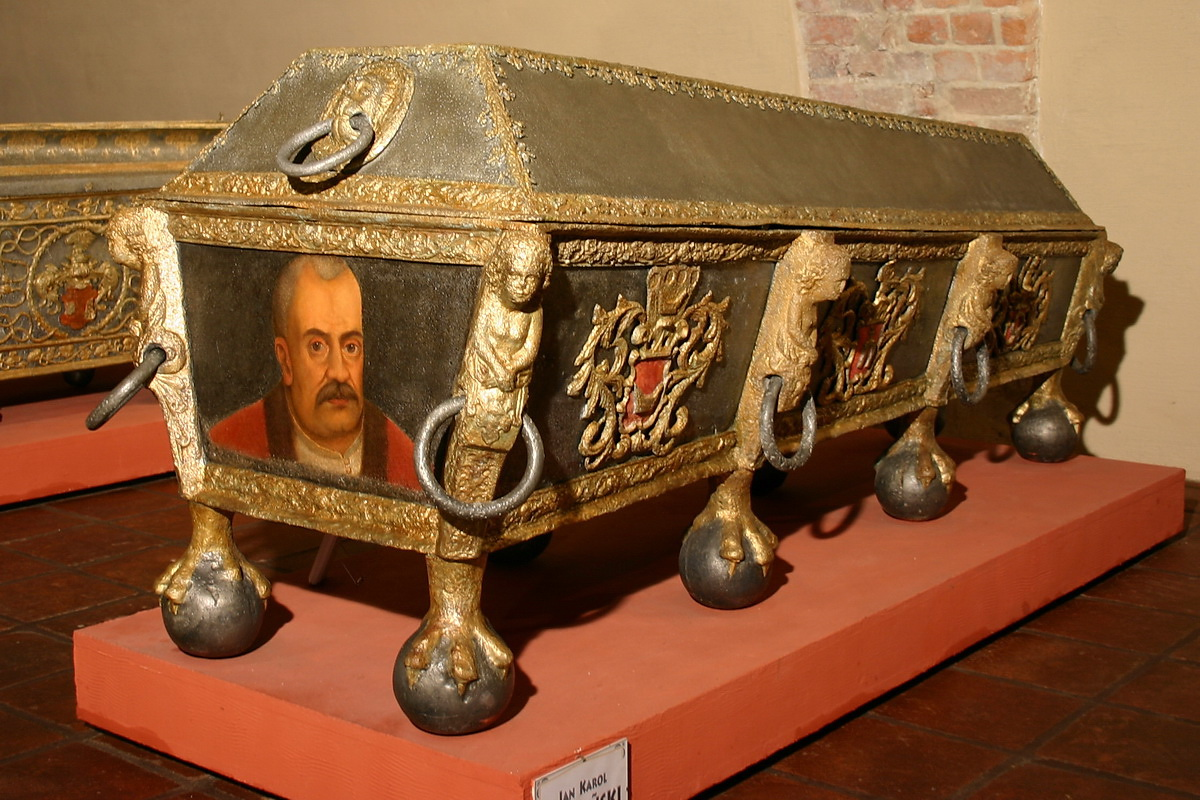
Jan Karol Opaliński's sarcophagus

== Marriage and issue ==
In December 1678, he married Zofia Anna Czarnkowska and had issue, only one of whom survived infancy.

- Maria Opalińska (August 1679-October 1679)
- Katarzyna, Queen of Poland (1680–1743)
- Stillborn child (1681)
- Stanislas Opaliński (1682-1682)

Katarzyna went on to marry Stanisław Leszczyński, the King of Poland and Duke of Lorraine.

== Ancestors ==
Ancestors of Jan Karol Opaliński

16. Jan Opaliński (1519–1561)
8. Jan Opaliński (1546-1598)
17. Anna Gostynska
4. Piotr Opaliński
9. Barbara z Ostroroga Lwowska
2. Krzysztof Opaliński
5. Zofia Kostka
1. Jan Karol Opaliński
12. Wojciech Sędziwój Czarnkowski
6. Adam Sędziwój Czarnkowski
13. Jadwiga Sierpska z Gulczewa
3. Teresa Konstancya Czarnkowska
7. Katarzyna Leszczyńska
