= Raczkowski =

Raczkowski (feminine: Raczkowska; plural: Raczkowscy) is a Polish noble surname associated with the Raczkowski coat of arms, a variation of the Nałęcz coat of arms and several other coats of arms. It corresponds to the Lithuanian surname Račkauskas, Ukrainian, and Russian surname Rachkovsky.

Notable people with the surname include:

- Andrew Raczkowski (born 1968), American politician
- Bogdan Raczkowski (1888– 1939), Polish engineer
- Damian Raczkowski (born 1975), Polish politician
- Krzysztof Raczkowski (1970–2005), Polish drummer
- Paweł Raczkowski (born 1983), Polish football referee
- Władysław Raczkowski (1893–1959), Polish conductor and composer
