= Konstancja Lubomirska =

Polish noble lady

- Princess
- Coat of arms: Lubomirski
- Born: ca. 1618
- Died: 1646; Czarnów
- Family: Lubomirski
- Consort: Kazimierz Franciszek Czarnkowski
- Issue: Adam Uriel Czarnkowski
- Father: Stanisław Lubomirski
- Mother: Zofia Ostrogska

Princess Konstancja Lubomirska (ca. 1618–1646) was a Polish noble lady.

Lubomirska married Kazimierz Franciszek Czarnkowski on 1 February 1637 in Kraków. She was the mother of Adam Uriel Czarnkowski, grandmother of Zofia Anna Czarnkowska, great-grandmother of Katarzyna Opalinska and the great-great-grandmother of Maria Leszczyńska. She died in 1646.
