= Rachkovsky =

Rachkovsky or Rachkovski (Russian: Рачковский, Ukrainian: Рачковські; both of them may be transliterated in both ways; in addition the Ukrainian one may be transliterated as Rachkovskyi). The Russian feminine form is Rachkovskaya (Russian: Рачковская). Ukrainian feminine: Rachkovska/Rachkovs'ka (Рачковська). It corresponds to the original Polish noble surname Raczkowski. Lithuanized form: Račkauskas.

The surname may refer to:

- Ilya Rashkovskiy, Russian pianist
- Iryna Bakovetska-Rachkovska (born 1985), Ukrainian novelist, poet, journalist, local historian, composer, public figure, ethno-rock performer.
- Pyotr Rachkovsky (1853–1910), Russian Empire police official
- Vangeliya Rachkovska, Bulgarian volleyballer
