= Kendziorski =

Kendziorski is a Polish surname. Notable people with the surname include:

- Casimir Kendziorski (1898–1974), American politician
- Christina Kendziorski, American biostatistician
