= Czarnkowski =

Czarnkowski family used Nałęcz coat of arms

The Czarnkowski family (feminine: Czarnkowska; plural: Czarnkowscy) was an old Polish noble family.

== Notable people ==
- Adam Sędziwój Czarnkowski (1555–1628), Polish nobleman
- Kazimierz Franciszek Czarnkowski (died 1656), Polish nobleman
- Zofia Czarnkowska Opalińska (1660–1701), Polish noblewoman
