= Jan Florian Drobysz Tuszyński =

Polish Nobleman

Jan Florian Drobysz Tuszyński (born 21 June 1640, d. 3 April 1707 in Zamość) was a Polish szlachcic (nobleman) and diarist.

During the service under Marcin Zamoyski he gained the office of stolnik of Zhytomyr. However, the date of this event is unknown.

He died on 3 April 1707 in Zamość. He was buried in St. Peter church in Zamość.

He wrote his diary after 1684. Some parts he finished before 1696 as he mentioned Jan III Sobieski as an alive. Adam Przyboś, a Polish historian and editor of Tuszyński's diary, considered that Drobysz Tuszyński had written notes during his military service and after retirement, in 1690s, he decided to compile them.
