= Bogdan Tuszyński =

Polish sports journalist, reporter and historian

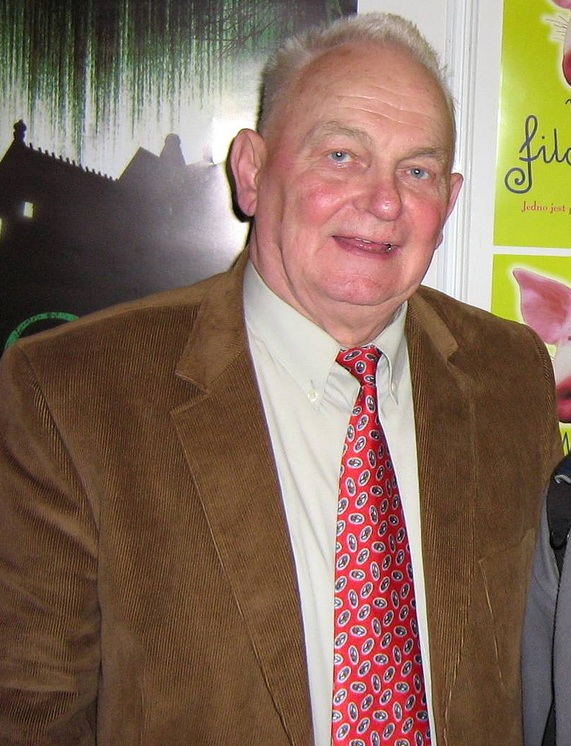
- Tuszyński in August 2007
- Born: Bogdan Romuald Tuszyński; 4 July 1932; Łódź, Poland
- Died: 1 January 2017 (aged 84); Warsaw, Poland
- Occupations: Journalist, reporter, historian
- Years active: 1951–2017
- Children: 3; including Agata Tuszyńska

Bogdan Romuald Tuszyński (4 July 1932 – 1 January 2017) was a Polish sports journalist, reporter and historian. He was best known for his sports report Studio S-13 of the Polskie Radio, beginning in 1970. Born in Łódź, he began his career as an editor of Przegląd Sportowy (1951–1952), before moving to Polskie Radio in 1953, departing from the radio broadcaster in 1981. He also reported on the Peace Race annually. He published approximately thirty books between 1975 and 2009.

For his services to Polish sports journalist, Tuszyński was awarded the Order of Polonia Restituta and the Cross of Merit.

Tuszyński died following a long illness on 1 January 2017 in Warsaw at the age of 84.
