= Aleksandra Fontaine =

Polish-French dancer and actress (born 1984)

Aleksandra Fontaine (born Aleksandra Kędzierska on April 13, 1984 (age 42)) is a Polish-French dancer and actress. She is also a novelist.

== Life and career ==
=== Early life ===
Fontaine grew up in Gdynia, Poland. She started dancing at the age of nine at the National Ballet School in Gdańsk. At sixteen, she left her parents and Poland to study neo-classical dance, choreography, and theater at the Anton Bruckner Private University for Music, Drama and Dance in Austria.

=== Dancing ===
Fontaine's first professional dance engagement was with the It Dansa company in Barcelona, Spain, in 2003. The same year, she became a Bluebell Girls dancer, joining the Lido cabaret in Paris, She appeared several times in Patrick Sébastien's show Le Plus Grand Cabaret du monde on France 2.

Fontaine appeared in documentaries in Poland (We are from Poland on TVP Polonia) and France (Sept à huit on TF1) on 18 March 2012,

=== Choreographer and producer ===
In 2015, Fontaine founded a production company, Fontaine Media, to produce her own shows, with the first one, the revue Le Rêve (Dream), presented in July 2015 in Kraków, Poland, at the Variété Theatre. In 2016, she presented the Theatre-Revue Show first in Singapore and then in Gdańsk.

=== Actress and body double ===
In 2010, she played the role of Indra in the film White as Snow by Christophe Blanc. She appeared in the short film Job Interview by Pauline Caballero in 2016. She next played a teacher in L'Atelier de l'ange (Angel's Workshop) by Pierre Laffargue. In 2017, she appeared in the film HHhH by Cédric Jimenez.

Fontaine served as body double for actresses such as Margaret Qualley, in The Substance, or Sandrine Kiberlain.

On 17 March 2018, she directed and played the role of Lidia in the adaptation of her novel La Fille à la valise (The Girl with the Suitcase) at the Municipal Theatre of Perpignan, France.
