= Church of Notre-Dame-de-Bonsecours, Nancy =

Church in Grand Est, France

Coordinates: 48.6767°N 6.1994°E

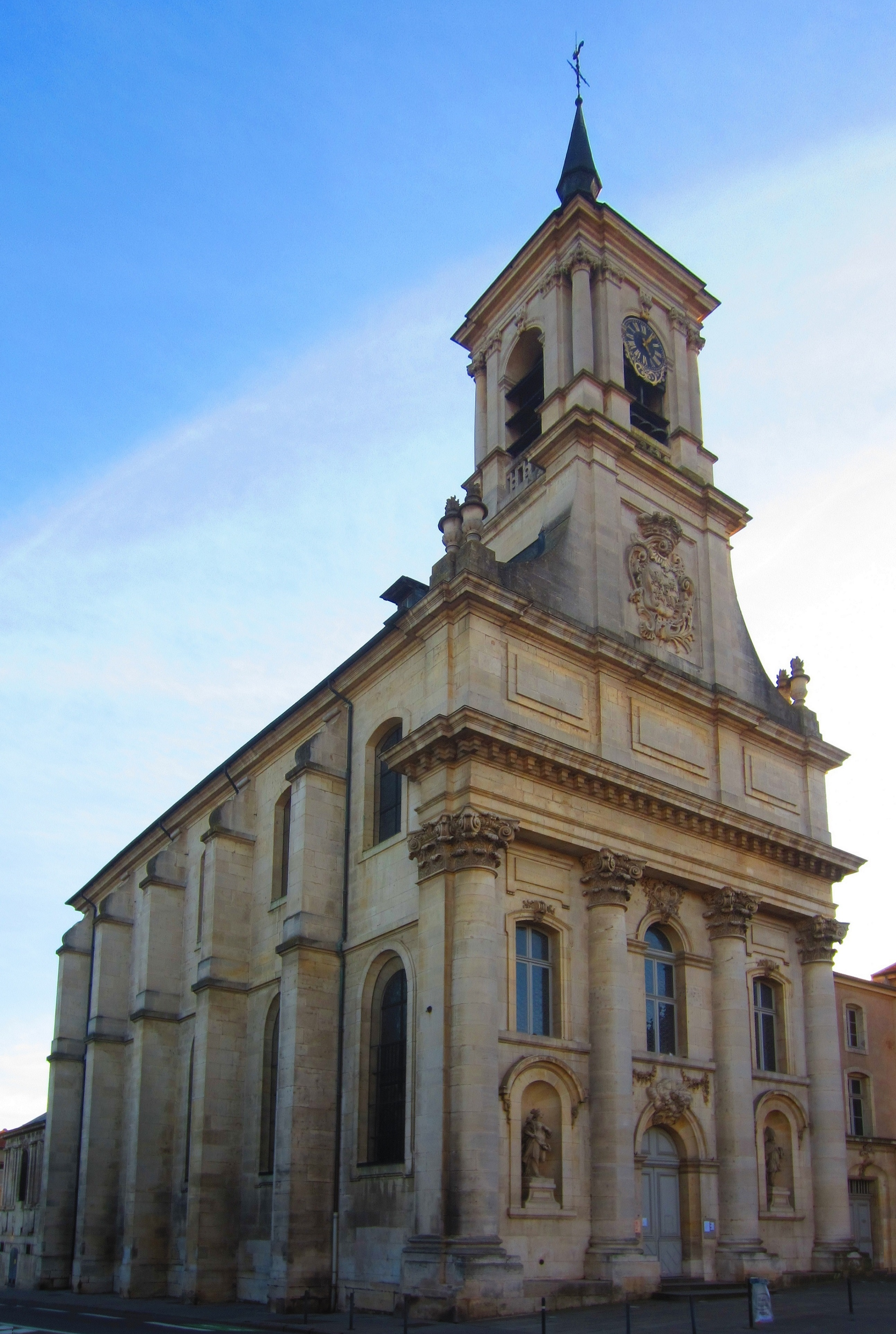
Church of Notre-Dame-de-Bonsecours, Nancy

The Church of Notre-Dame-de-Bonsecours (Our Lady of Good Help) is a historic church located in Nancy, France.

It used to be the resting place of the Polish king Stanisław Leszczyński, who was the last duke of Lorraine. A large stone relief of the coat of arms of the Polish–Lithuanian Commonwealth is located on the clock tower on the main front.

It is home to the 1505 statue of Our Lady of Good Help, sculpted by Mansuy Gauvain in 1505.

== Images ==
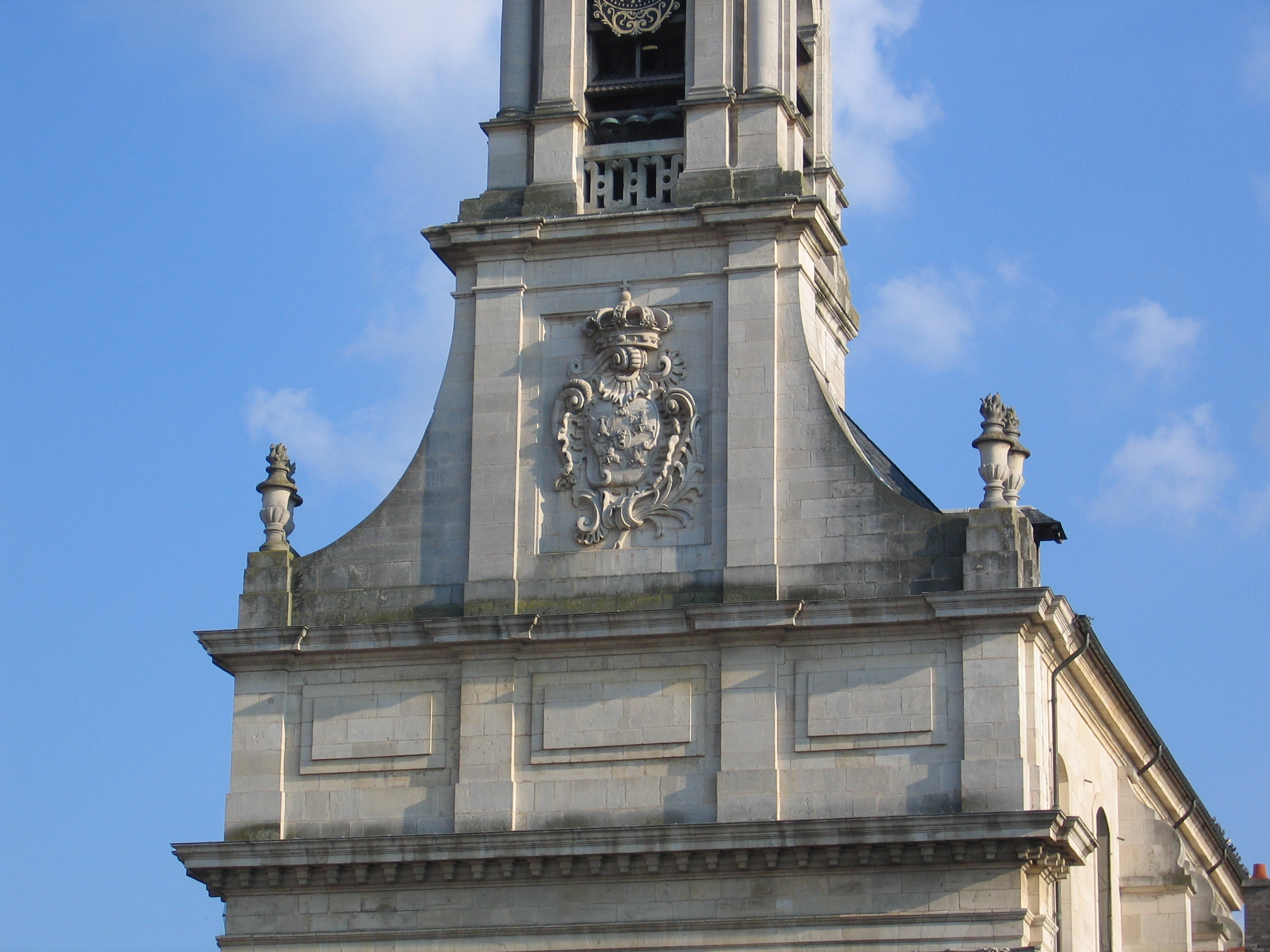
Coat of arms of Polish–Lithuanian Commonwealth

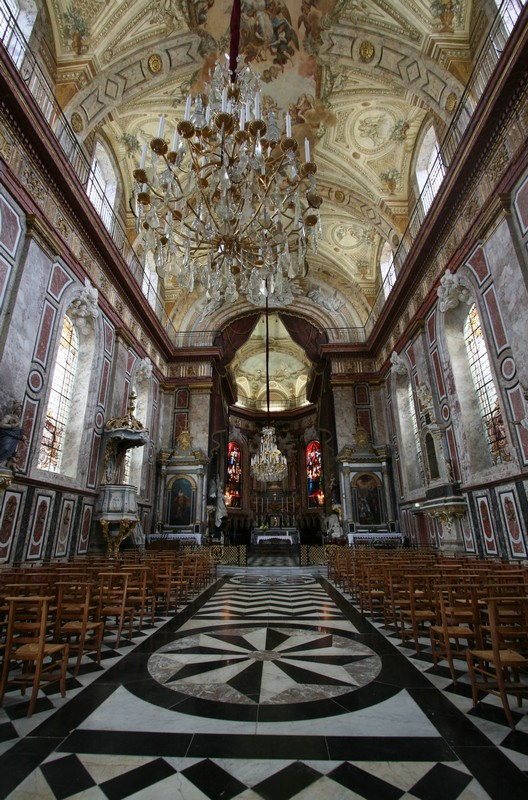
Interior

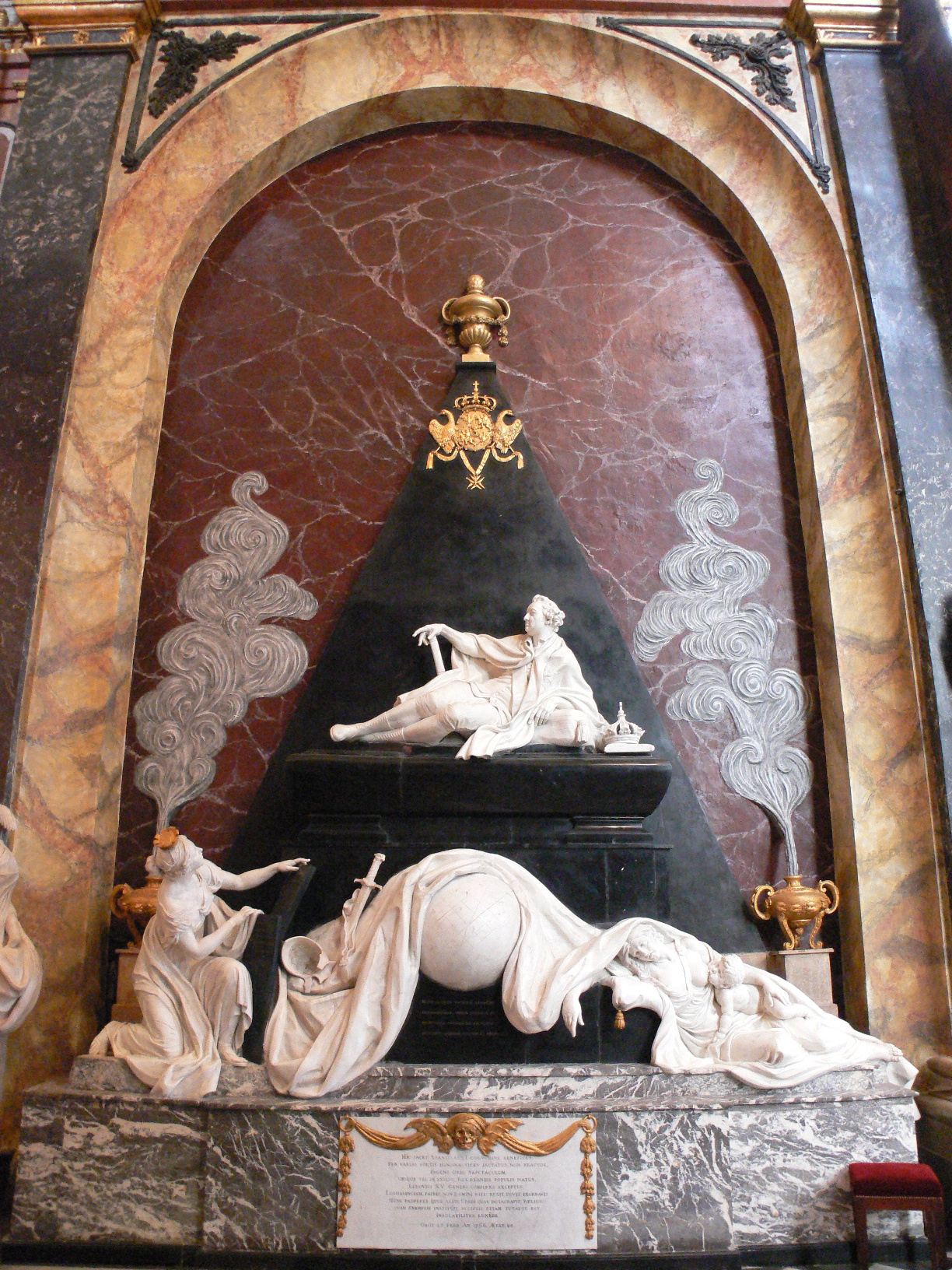
Cenotaph of Stanisław Leszczyński

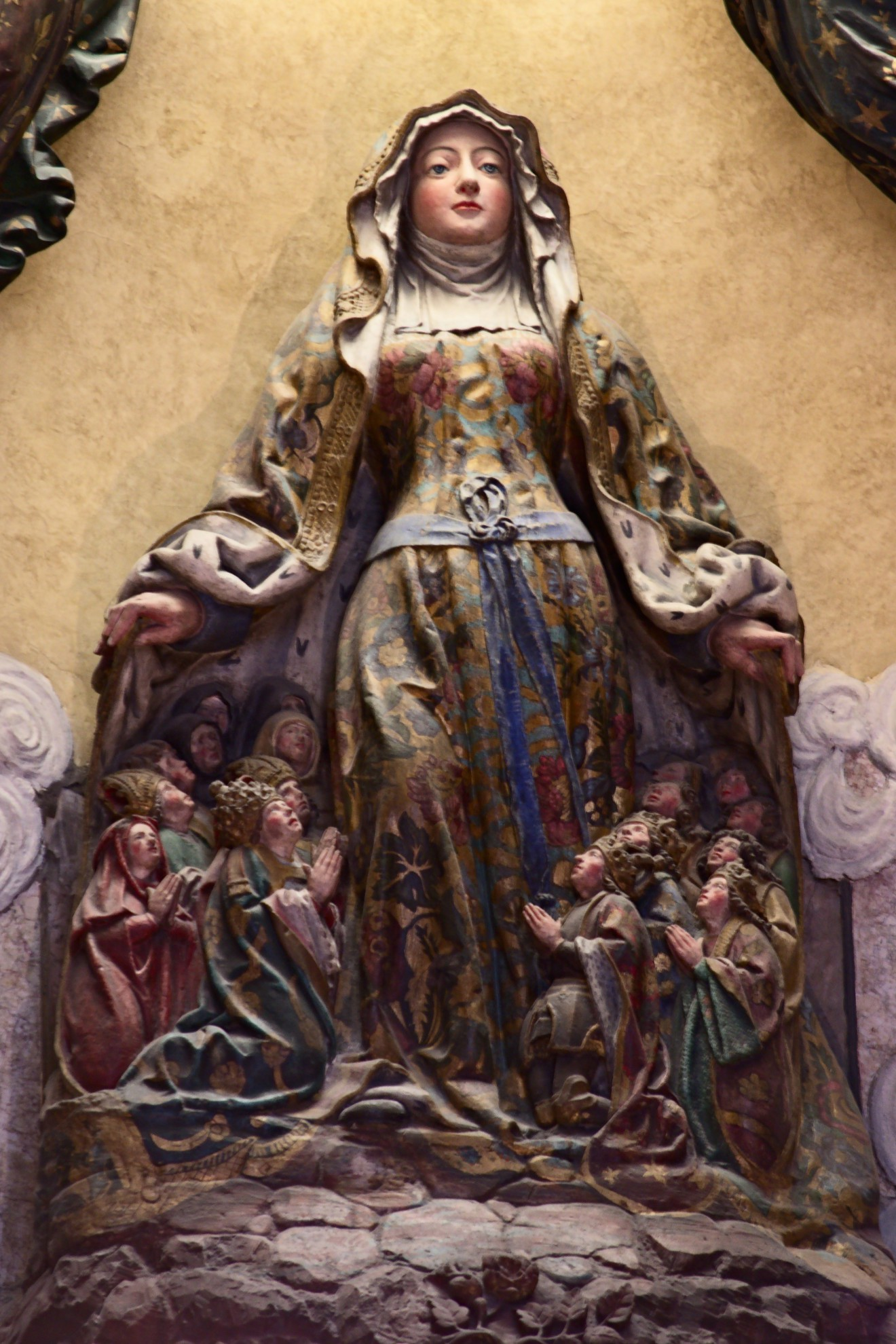
Our Lady of Good Help, by Mansuy Gauvain (1505)
