= Zofia Czarnkowska Opalińska =

Polish noblewoman

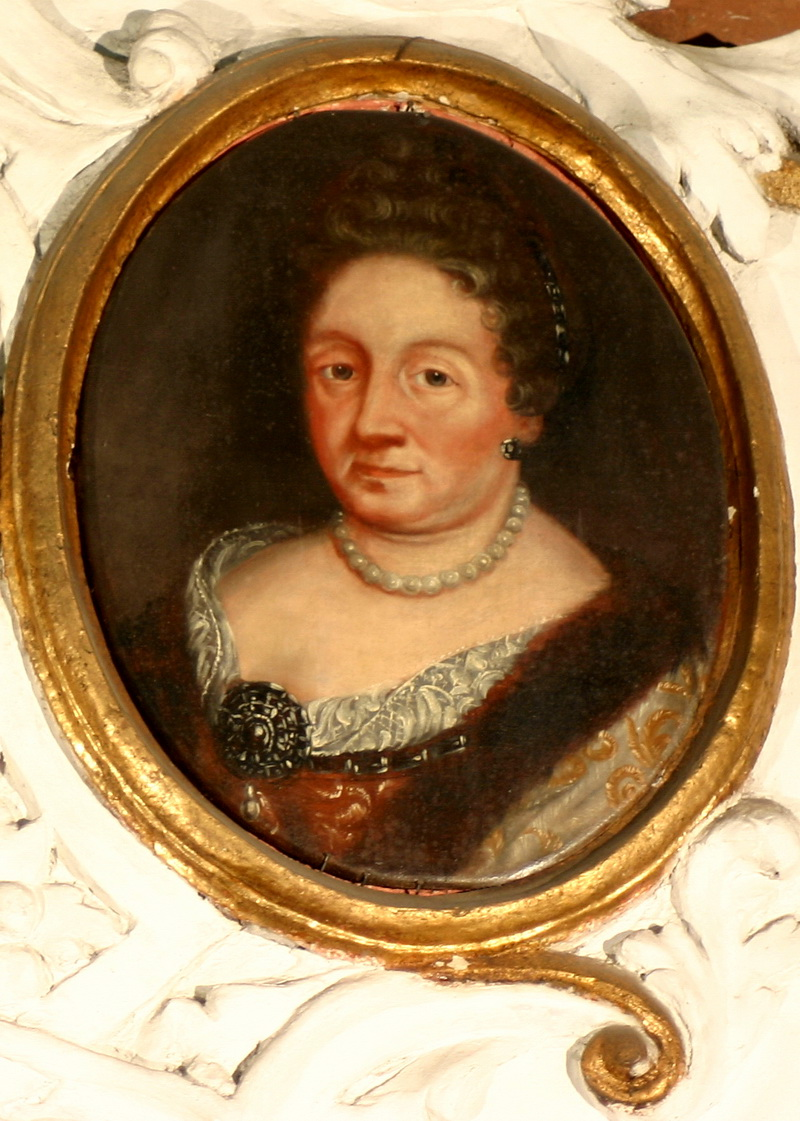
- Zofia Anna Czarnkowska, detail of a monument in the church of Sieraków
- Born: Zofia Anna Czarnkowska; 12 March 1660; Poznań
- Died: 2 December 1701 (aged 41); Wrocław
- Noble family: Czarnkowski
- Spouse: Jan Karol Opalinski
- Father: Adam Uriel Czarnkowski
- Mother: Theresa Zaleska

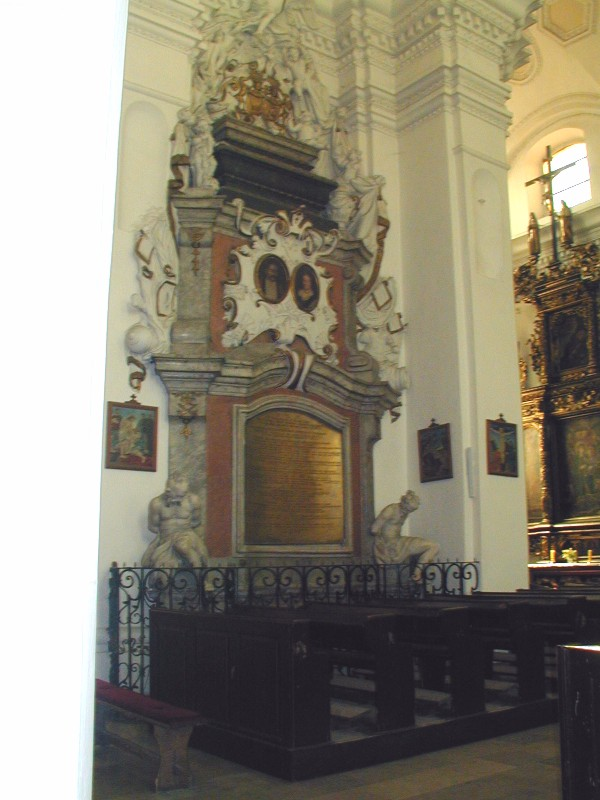
Jan and Zofia Opaliński monument, church of Sieraków

Sofia Anna Czarnkowska (also called Zofia Czarnkowska Opalińska or Catherine-Sophie-Anne Czarnkowska) (12 March 1660 – 2 December 1701) was a Polish noblewoman, known as the maternal grandmother of the queen of France, Marie Leszczyńska.

== Life ==
She was the daughter of Adam Uriel Czarnkowski and Teresa Zaleska. She married Jan Karol Opaliński on 4 December 1678. They had the children Maria (August 1679 – October 1679), Catherine (Katarzyna) Opalińska, Queen of Poland (1680–1743), a stillborn child (1681), and Stanislas (1682–1682). She became the grandmother of Marie Leszczyńska (who would be Queen Consort of France, married to Louis XV) and Anna Leszczyńska.

She died on 8 December 1701 from pneumonia aged 41, at Breslau (today Wrocław).

== Legacy ==
A monument was erected in 1748 in the church of Sieraków. The crypt in a nearby castle contains the sarcophagus of the Opaliński family.

== See also ==
- Opaliński family
