= Christina Kendziorski =

American biostatistician

Christina Marie Kendziorski is a biostatistician whose research involves genomics, statistical genetics, and the statistical analysis of data from high-throughput sequencing. She is a professor in the Department of Biostatistics & Medical Informatics at the University of Wisconsin–Madison,

== Education and career ==
Kendziorski grew up in the housing projects of Chicago, in an apartment shared by her mother and grandmother, neither of whom had a college education. She earned a bachelor's degree in mathematics in 1992 from the University of Wisconsin–Eau Claire, and completed her Ph.D. in 1998 from Marquette University, where she studied mathematics with a specialization in biostatistics. Her dissertation, supervised by Peter J. Tonellato, was A Physiologially Based Mathematical Model of Arterial Pressure Recordings.

After completing her doctorate, Kendziorski became a postdoctoral scholar at the University of Wisconsin–Madison. She was hired as regular-rank faculty there in 2001. Since 2010, she has headed the Statistical Genetics and Genomics program in Wisconsin's Institute for Translational and Clinical Research.

== Recognition ==
Kendziorski became a Fellow of the American Statistical Association in 2018.
