= Agata Tuszyńska =

Polish writer, poet and journalist (born 1957)

Agata Tuszynska
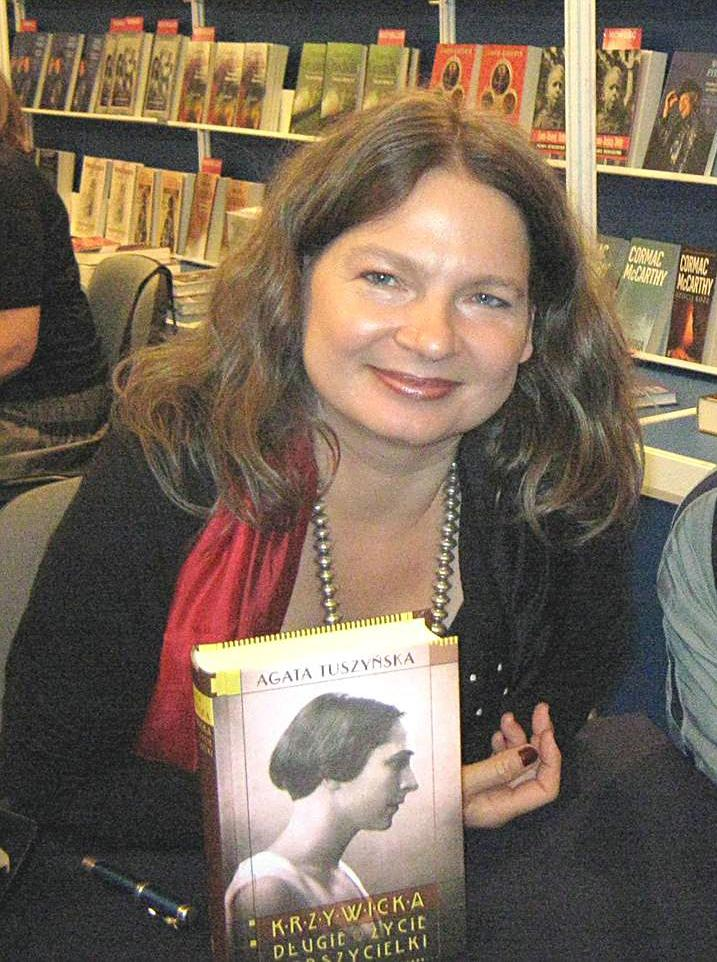
- 2009
- Born: May 25, 1957; Warsaw, Poland
- Occupations: Poet, writer, journalist
- Writing career
- Language: Polish

Agata Tuszynska (born May 25, 1957) is a Polish writer, poet and journalist.

== Biography ==
The daughter of Bogdan Tuszyński, sports reporter and historian, and Halina Przedborska journalist, Agata Tuszynska graduated from the prestigious Academy of Drama and Theatrical Art in Warsaw, majoring in History of Drama. She received her PhD in humanities from the Institute of Arts of the Polish Academy of Sciences. In 1987–1992, she worked as a lecturer at the Institute of Literary Research. In 1996–1998, she lectured at the Center for Journalism in Warsaw, and from 2001, taught courses in reportage and literary history at Warsaw University. From 2011 she's been cooperating with the Reportage Institute in Warsaw.

She began her literary career in cultural periodicals as an author of articles on theater, combining it with an interest in biography and literary reportage. She made her debut in 1990 with the fin de siècle biography of the Warsaw actress, Maria Wisnowska. The same year, she published the book Russians in Warsaw, in the Literary Institute in Paris, describing the life and culture of the enslaved capital under the Russian occupation. In 1994, she published the book Singer: Landscapes of Memory, the biography of the Nobel winner Isaac Bashevis Singer, born in Poland and writing in Yiddish. Tuszynska collected materials for this book in the United States, Israel, France, and in Polish small towns and villages. The book, reprinted many times in Poland, was also published in the USA and France.

Tuszynska continued her interest in the vanishing world of the Polish Jews in the volume of Israeli reports Portraits with Poland in the Background, also published in the French translation. Confessions of a Temptress – memories of Irena Krzywicka, writer and feminist, author of Literary News and a longtime friend of Tadeusz Boy-Zelenski – was the book Tuszynska wrote in a tiny town near Paris, where Krzywicka lived since the mid-1960s. In her next book, The Long Life of a Temptress, published in 1999 Tuszynska returned to Krzywicka's story after her death.

A Family History of Fear, Tuszynska's bestseller, released in March 2005, and nominated for the Prix Medicis, is a dramatic and complex story about the fate of her Polish and Jewish ancestors. The author combined here her experience in biography writing with personal non-fiction, the genre rarely used in Poland. In May 2016 the book was published in English by Knopf.

A story of her struggle with her husband's cancer is the subject of Exercises of Loss, very intimate book by Agata Tuszynska (2007), also published in French (Grasset, 2009) and Korean (2012).

The most controversial in her literary output is The Accused: Vera Gran (Wydawnictwo Literackie, 2010) – the story of a singer from the Warsaw ghetto, accused of collaborating with the Germans. The book, based on conversations with Gran, supplemented by witness accounts and opinions, documents, archives and court testimony, has become a multidimensional treatise on the tragic choices, their moral consequences and the price to pay for salvation. "The Accused" was published in a number of countries: France, Spain, Italy, the Netherlands, Greece, Israel and in the US by Knopf-Randomhous-Bertelsmann Publishers. It was released in Germany by Suhrkamp / Insel in March 2013. In 2015 the Slovenian Modrijan published the book, as well as the Macedonian publishing house Antolog. The story of Vera Gran is also available in an audible audio edition in Polish.

Tyrmandowie. Romans amerykański is Tuszyńska’s latest publication. It tells the story about the last period of Tyrmand’s life, the author of Zły (published in English as The Man With White Eyes), alongside his American wife – Mary Ellen Fox. Almost a hundred of never before published Tyrmand’s letters complete memories of the widow, showing a completely unseen face of the Vistula River playboy.

In November 2013 Dialog published a drama Wiera co-written with Jerzy Żurek.

In The Fiancé of Bruno Schulz (Wydawnictwo Literackie, 2015) she presents an extraordinary literary story, connecting dramatic elements of love and war. This time she was inspired by Juna, Józefina Szelińska, the only woman whom Bruno Schulz proposed the marriage. The book was nominated for the Prix Médicis and the Prix Femina 2015. It was translated into French, Macedonian and Ukrainian.

Jamnikarium (Wydawnictwo MG, 2016) is about dachshunds and their famous owners and for dachshunds lovers.

Bagaż osobisty. Po Marcu is a polyphonic story about the generation of post-March emigrants who left Poland with a “travel document” stating that its holder is no longer a citizen of the country. It is the story of growing up, friendship, losing one’s homeland and starting a new life as an emigrant. Co-written with the participants of a History Meeting House seminar: Dorota Barczak-Perfikowska, Grażyna Latos, Elżbieta Strzałkowska, and Wiola Wejman.

The newest Mama zawsze wraca based on the memories of a Holocaust survivor, is a moving story of a girl hidden for many months in the Warsaw Ghetto. Beautifully illustrated by Iwona Chmielewska the book is a testimony of the saving power of love and imagination.

Bibliothèque Braille Romande from Geneva printed in braille the following books of Tuszynska: "Accused: Vera Gran", "A Family History of Fear" and "Exercises of Loss."

Along with biography and reportage, Agata Tuszynska is engaged in writing poetry. She is the author of six collections of poetry, of which the latest, Hope 2, was released in the winter of 2010. Her poems were published in English, French, Hebrew, Spanish and Russian translations.

She contributes to Historical Notebooks, Literary Notebooks, Tygodnik Powszechny, Borderlands and Odra and collaborated with the Paris Culture. Member of the Association of Polish Writers, PEN-Club and ZAIKS, scholar at Columbia University, the Fulbright Foundation, MacDowell, Ledig-Rowohlt, Kosciuszko Foundation, Yad Vashem and the American Jewish Archives. Winner of the Xavier Pruszynski PEN-Club award for outstanding achievements in the field of documentary and fiction. In 2015 Tuszyńska was awarded the silver Gloria Artis Medal. In 2016 – the Canadian Jewish Literary Award in a category of Holocaust Literature for "Family History of Fear".

== Works ==
- 1980 – Rysowanie
- 1990 – I znowu list, Warsaw: Oficyna Poetów
- 1990 – Maria Wisnowska, Warsaw: WAiF
- 1992 – Rosjanie w Warszawie, Warsaw: Interim
- 1992 – Wyznania gorszycielki. Pamiętniki Ireny Krzywickiej, Warsaw: Czytelnik
- 1993 – Zamieszkałam w ucieczce, Lublin: Kresy
- 1993 – Kilka portretów z Polską w tle. Reportaże izraelskie, Gdańsk: Marabut
- 1994 – Singer. Pejzaże pamięci, Gdańsk: Marabut
- 1996 – Wygrać każdy dzień, Warsaw: Diana
- 1997 – Adresat nieznany, Warsaw: Diana
- 1999 – Długie życie gorszycielki. Losy i świat Ireny Krzywickiej, Warsaw: Iskry
- 2001 – Na cudzych brzegach, Warsaw: Diana
- 2001 – Łęczyca, Warszawa: Diana
- 2003 – Maria Wisnowska. Jeśli mnie kochasz – zabij!, Warsaw: Wydawnictwo Książkowe Twój Styl
- 2004 – Miejsce przy oknie, Warsaw: Wydawnictwo Nowy Świat
- 2005 – Rodzinna historia lęku, Kraków: Wydawnictwo Literackie
- 2007 – Ćwiczenia z utraty, Kraków: Wydawnictwo Literackie
- 2009 – Krzywicka. Długie życie gorszycielki (expanded edition), Kraków: Wydawnictwo Literackie
- 2010 – Oskarżona: Wiera Gran, Kraków: Wydawnictwo Literackie
- 2010 – Nadzieja 2, Lublin: Brama Grodzka – Teatr NN
- 2012 – Tyrmandowie. Romans amerykański, Warsaw: Wydawnictwo MG
- 2013 – Wiera. Dramat w sześciu obrazach, Warsaw: Dialog 684
- 2015 – Narzeczona Schulza, Kraków: Wydawnictwo Literackie
- 2016 – Jamnikarium, Warsaw: Wydawnictwo MG
- 2018 - Bagaż osobisty. Po Marcu, Warsaw: Dom Spotkań z Historią
- 2020 - Mama zawsze wraca, Warsaw: Wydawnictwo Dwie Siostry, illustrations: Iwona Chmielewska

== Translations ==
=== English ===
Lost Landscapes: In Search of Isaac Bashevis Singer and the Jews of Poland (Singer. Pejzaże pamięci). transl. Madeline Levine. New York: William Morrow 1998 Vera Gran – The Accused (Oskarżona: Wiera Gran). transl.from French Charles Ruas. New York: Knopf. Random House, Inc. 2013 Family History of Fear (Rodzinna historia lęku). transl.from French Charles Ruas. New York: Knopf. Random House, Inc. 2016

=== Czech ===
Krajiny pameti (Singer. Pejzaże pamięci), transl. Vlasta Dvorackova. H&H Vysehradska s.r.o., 2006

=== French ===
Les disciples de Schulz (Uczniowie Schulza), transl. M.Carlier, G.Erhard. Paris: Noir sur Blanc 2000 Singer. Paysages de la memoire (Singer. Pejzaże pamięci), transl. Jean Yves Erhel. Paris: Noir sur Blanc 2002 Une histoire familiale de la peur (Rodzinna historia lęku), transl. by Jean-Yves Erhel. Paris: Éditions Grasset & Fasquelle 2006 Exercices de la perte (Ćwiczenia z utraty), transl. Jean-Yves Erhel. Paris: Éditions Grasset & Fasquelle 2009 L'Accusée: Wiera Gran (Oskarżona: Wiera Gran), transl. Isabelle Jannès-Kalinowski, Grasset & Fasquelle 2011 La fiancée de Bruno Schulz (Narzeczona Schulza), transl.Isabelle Jannès-Kalinowski, Grasset & Fasquelle 2015 Affaires personnelles (Bagaż osobisty), transl. Isabelle Jannès-Kalinowski, Éditions de l'antilope 2020

=== German ===
Die Sängerin aus dem Ghetto, trans. from French Xenia Osthelder, Suhrkamp/Insel 2013

=== Greek ===
Oskarżona: Wiera Gran, transl. Thomas Skassis, Rachel Kapon 2011

=== Spanish ===
La cantante del gueto de Varsovia. Wiera Gran, la acusada (Oskarżona: Wiera Gran), transl. Íñigo Sánchez Paños, Elena-Michelle Cano, Madrit: Alianza Literaria, 2011

=== Korean ===
Ćwiczenia z utraty, DD World, 2011

=== Dutch ===
Vera Gran. De zangeres van het getto van Warschau. transl. Liesbeth van Nes, De Bezige Bij, Amsterdam, 2011

=== Italian ===
Wiera Gran. L'accusata. transl. Margherita Botto, Giulio Einaudi, 2012

=== Hebrew ===
Vera Gran, transl. from French Arieh Uriel, Kinneret, 2012

=== Slovenian ===
Obtozena, transl. Tatjana Jamnik, Modrijan, 2015

=== Macedonian ===
Obwinieta: Wjera Gran [Oskarżona: Wiera Gran], transl. Milica Mirkulowska, Skopje: Antolog, 2015 Narzeczona Schulza, transl. Milica Mirkulowska, Skopje: Antolog, 2016

=== Ukrainian ===
Narzeczona Schulza, transl. Wiera Meniok, Czerniowice: Wydawnictwo 21, 2018

== Bibliography ==
- Beres S., Historia literatury polskiej w rozmowach XX-XXI w., WAB, Warsaw 2005, ISBN 83-88221-75-2
- Cieślar A., Kobieta metafizyczna, rozmowy Artura Cieślara, Wydawnictwo Inanna, Warsaw 2005, ISBN 83-920015-1-6;
- Grol R., Ambers Aglow. An Anthology of Contemporary Polish Women’s Poetry (1981–1995), Host Publications, Inc., Austin Texas 1996, ISBN 0-924047-15-1;
- Jochymek R., W zwierciadle biografii. Współczesna polska biografia literacka na przykładzie utworów Joanny Siedleckiej, Agaty Tuszyńskiej, Barbary Wachowicz, Oficyna Wydawnicza RYTM, Warsaw 2004, ISBN 83-7399-026-7;
- Lexique nomade: Assises du roman, Le Monde, Villa Gillet, ISBN 978 2 267020977;
- Molisak A., Pisarze polsko-żydowscy XX w. Przybliżenia, Dom Wydawniczy ELIPSA, Warsaw 2006, ISBN 83-7151-750-5
- Raconter l’Histoire. Textes reunis at presentes par Alexandre Prstojević, Éditions L'Improviste 2009, ISBN 978-2-913764-39-2;
