= Kazimierz Franciszek Czarnkowski =

Polish nobleman

- Coat of arms: Nałęcz
- Born: 1613/1617; Łęczyca
- Died: 1656; Poznań
- Family: Czarnkowski
- Consort: Konstancja Lubomirska; Anna Konstancja Wejher
- Issue: with Anna Konstancja Wejher; Katarzyna Barbara Czarnkowska with Konstancja Lubomirska; Adam Uriel Czarnkowski
- Father: Adam Sędziwój Czarnkowski
- Mother: Katarzyna Leszczyńska

Kazimierz Franciszek Czarnkowski, (1613/17–1656), of the Nałęcz coat of arms, was a Polish nobleman (szlachcic).

Kazimierz was Colonel of the voivodeships of Greater Poland and castellan of Poznań since 1646. He married Princess Konstancja Lubomirska on February 1, 1637 in Kraków and Anna Konstancja Wejher about 1650.
