= Krzysztof Opaliński =

Polish nobleman and politician

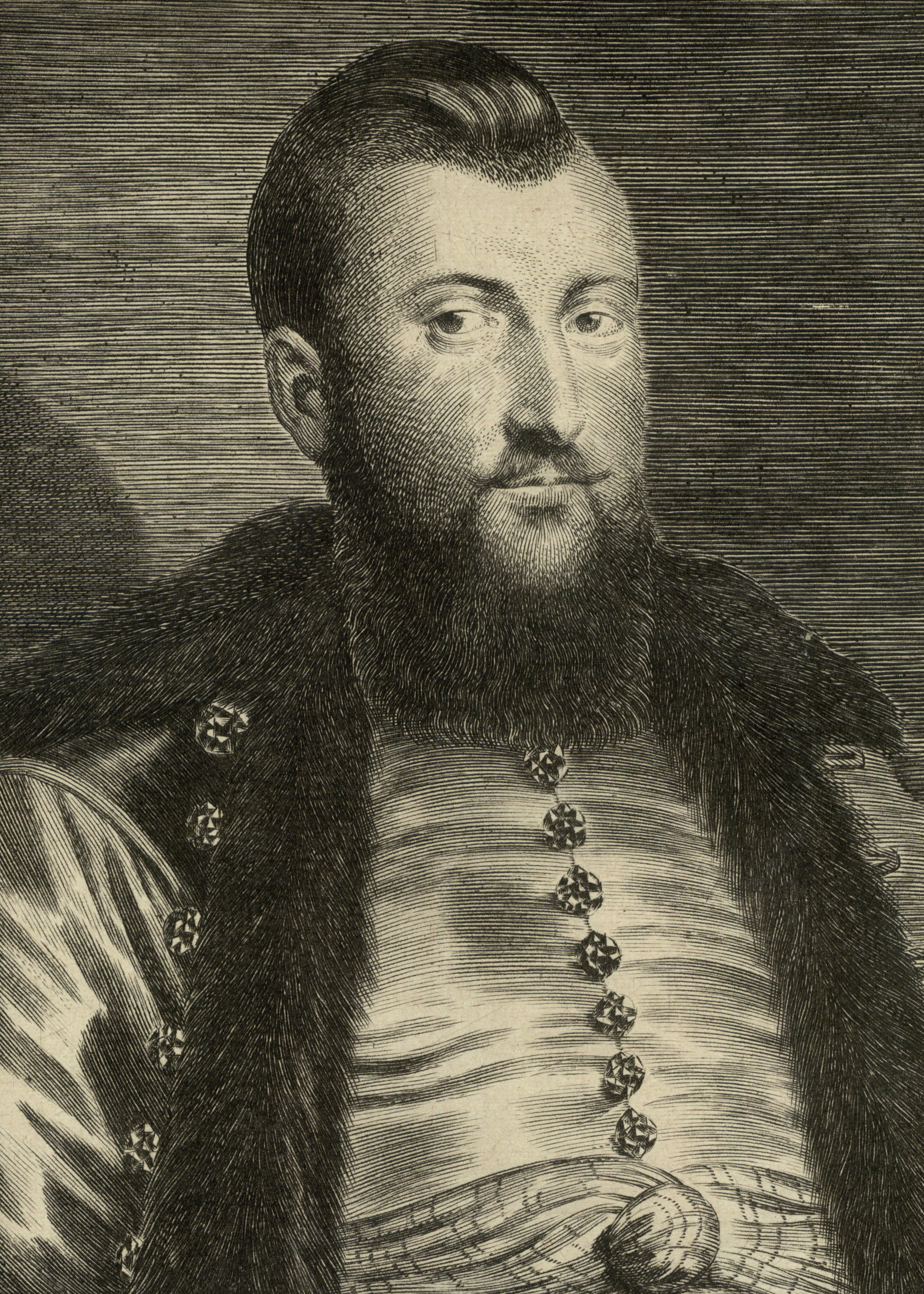
- Coat of arms: Opaliński
- Born: 21 January 1611; Sieraków, Polish–Lithuanian Commonwealth
- Died: 6 December 1655 (aged 44); Włoszakowice, Polish–Lithuanian Commonwealth
- Noble family: Opaliński
- Spouse: Teresa Czarnkowska
- Issue: Piotr Adam Opaliński; Jan Karol Opaliński; Zofia Krystyna Opalińska; Teodora Konstancja Opalińska; Ludwika Maria Opalińska; Franciszka Teodora Opalińska
- Father: Piotr Opaliński
- Mother: Zofia Kostka

Krzysztof Opaliński (21 January 1611 – 6 December 1655) was a Polish szlachta (nobleman), politician, writer, satirist, and Voivode (Governor) of Poznań. A notable figure during the Swedish Deluge, Opaliński was a skilled diplomat who opposed King John II Casimir and published many of his works concerning the daily political or social matters in the Polish–Lithuanian Commonwealth.

== Biography ==
He was the son of Piotr Opaliński and married Teresa Czarnkowska on 28 May 1634, with whom he had two sons, Piotr Adam Opaliński II and Jan Karol Opaliński, and four daughters.

Together with his brother Łukasz Opaliński he studied in the Lubrański Academy in Poznań (1620–1625), and later abroad at Louvain (1626–1629), Orléans (1629) and Padua (1630). After returning to the Polish–Lithuanian Commonwealth with the position of a starost he became active on the political scene. In February 1632, he was elected a deputy at the election sejm which elected Władysław IV Vasa. In 1637, after his father's death, he became the Voivode of Poznań. Opaliński opposed most of Władysław's military proposals (from increasing the army to the war against the Ottoman Empire), although he supported his idea of sea tariffs. In 1645 he led a diplomatic mission to Paris, where he was a proxy of king Władysław IV during his marriage to Marie Louise Gonzaga, whom he escorted back to Poland afterwards.

In 1647 Opaliński purchased the town of Sieraków from his brother Łukasz and, in 1650, opened the first modern school in Poland, using the didactic materials prepared by Jan Amos Komenski (Komenský, Comenius). A Catholic himself, Opaliński was critical of the zealous Society of Jesus and supported religious tolerance. He was a patron of writers, scientists and a bibliophiles.

Opaliński was a lifelong political rival of starost Bogusław Leszczyński in Greater Poland.

When in 1648 Poland elected John II Casimir as king, Opaliński joined the opposition. The king had few friends among the Polish nobility, as he openly sympathised with Austria and showed disregard and contempt for Sarmatism, which has become part of Polish culture. Due to this, thinking that John Casimir was too weak or for any other reasons, he encouraged King Charles X Gustav of Sweden to claim the Polish Crown. During the Swedish invasion (The Deluge) Krzysztof Opaliński and Bogusław Leszczyński were tasked with defence of the Greater Poland province. Dissatisfied with policies of John Casimir, they decided to surrender together with their pospolite ruszenie to Charles Gustav at Ujście on 25 July 1655. Many other voivodes of other voivodeships followed their suit, especially Prince Janusz Radziwiłł in the Grand Duchy of Lithuania (although Krzysztof's brother, Łukasz Opaliński, remained loyal to the Polish king). Almost the entire country was overrun by the Swedes, before the Jasna Góra resistance and the Tyszowce Confederation which turned the tide against the Swedes.

Opaliński died in 1655 at Włoszakowice at the age of 44. He was buried next to his father in the catacombs of a local church in Sieraków.

== Works ==
He was the author of numerous works, including Satyry, albo Przestrogi do naprawy rządu i obyczajów w Polszcze należące (Satires, or Warnings Related to the Reform of Government and Customs in Poland) published in 1650, in the aftermath of the Khmelnytsky Uprising that spelled the end of the Golden Age of the Commonwealth. The satires, modelled on the Satires of Juvenal, written in an unrhymed syllabic verse, are his most famous work. In his works, Opaliński denounced the oppression of peasants (increasing serfdom) and corruption of Golden Freedoms, visible in the increasing anarchy which was to be found in political life. He also wrote on witchcraft in one the satires, one of the few contemporary voices to correctly identify some of the motives behind the witchcraft persecution and to denounce them. He wrote comedies and tragedies, however they were lost with time.

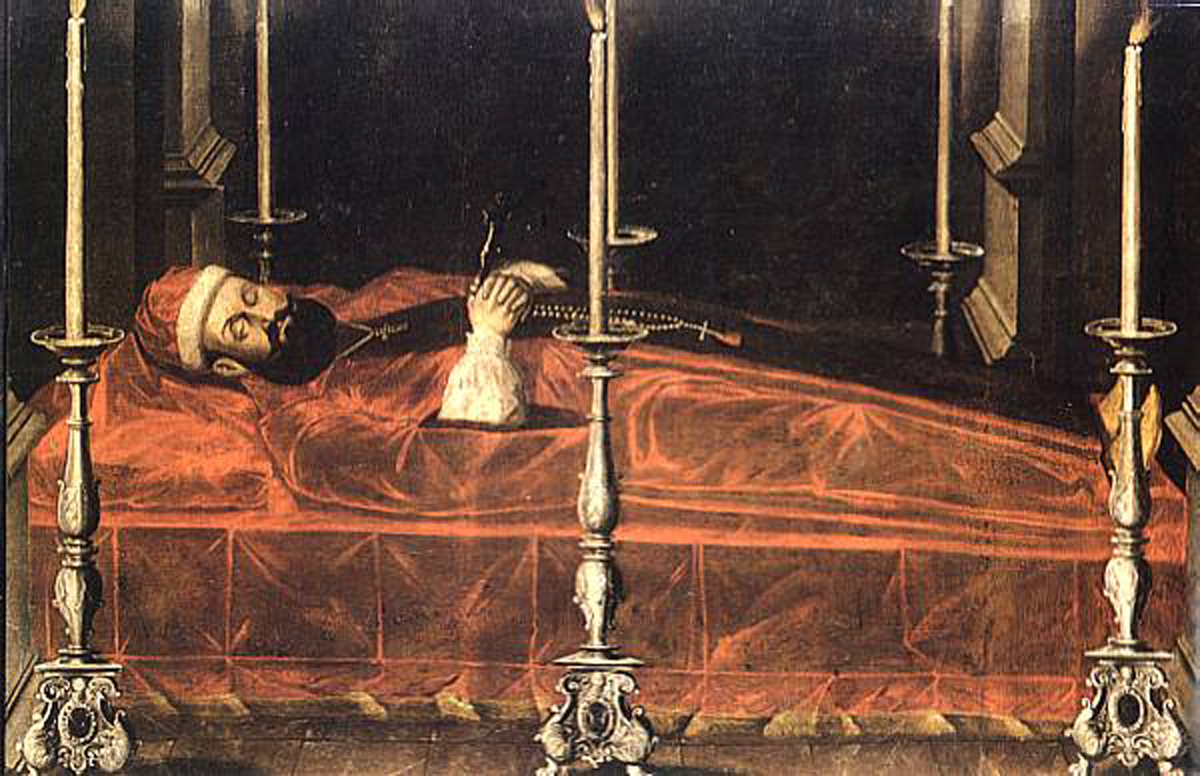
Krzysztof Opaliński after his death. Painting at the Sieraków church.

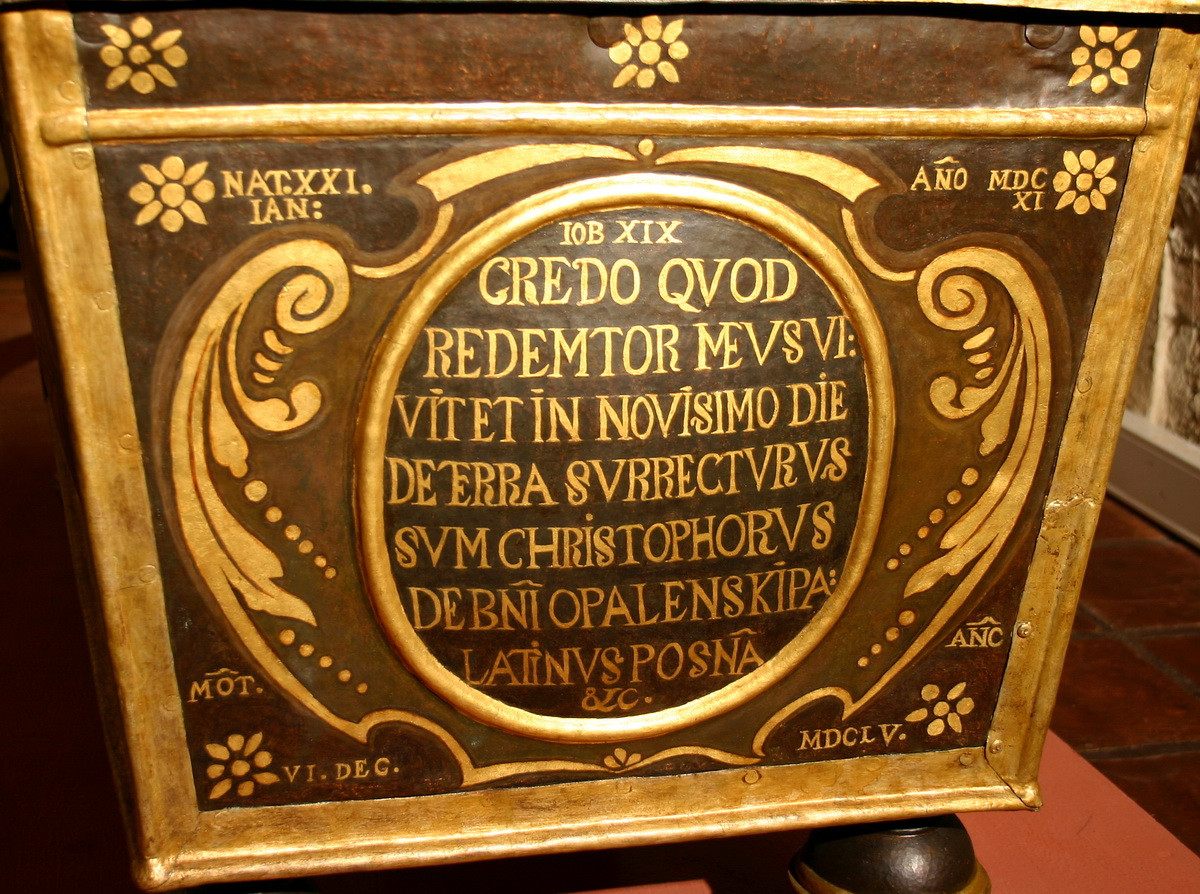
Krzysztof Opalinski sarcophagus with date of birth and death

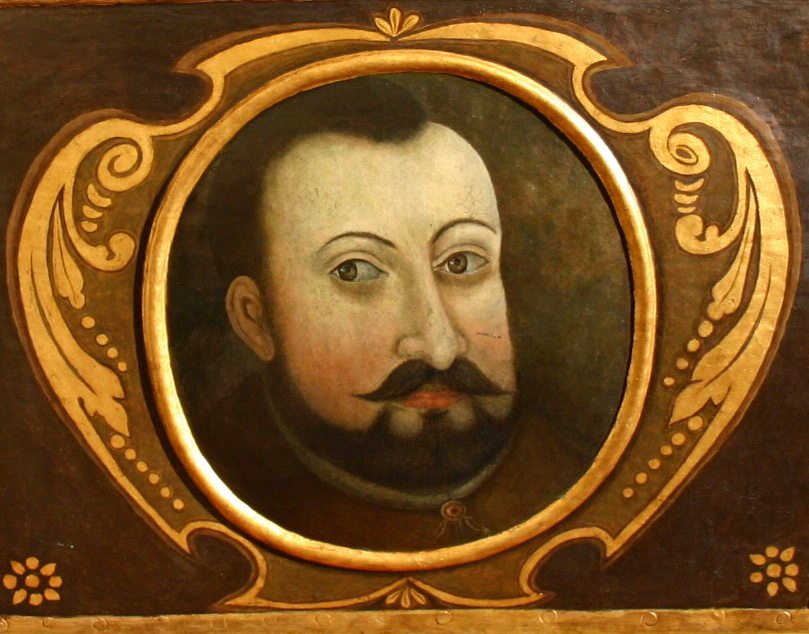
Krzysztof Opaliński portrait on sarcophagus

== Quotes ==
"Nierządem Polska stoi" – nieźle ktoś powiedział;
Lecz drugi odpowiedział, że nierządem zginie.
Pan Bóg nas ma jak błaznów. I to prawdy blisko,
Że między ludźmi Polak jest Boże igrzysko.

— "Satyra VI. Na ogołocone ściany w obronę"

Translated:

"Anarchy supports Poland" – well somebody said;
But other replied, that with anarchy it will fall.
God thinks we are clowns, and that's close to truth,
that among people Pole's the God's Playground.

— "Satire VI. For empty walls in defense"

Rozumiem, że Bóg Polski za nico nie karze
Więcej, jak za poddanych srogą opresyją
I gorzej niż niewolą. Jakoby chłop nie był
Bliźnim nie tylko twoim, ale i człowiekiem.
...
Zamykam, jakom zaczął, że Bóg Polskę karze
Najwięcej za poddanych, ba, i karać będzie,
Jeżeli się, Polaku, nie obaczysz kiedy.

— "Satyra III. Na ciężary i opresyją chłopską w Polszcze"

Translated:

I believe God punishes Poland for nothing
But for the cruel oppression of her subjects
Which is worse than serfdom. It's as if the peasant
Were not your fellow man or a human being.
...
I close as I began; God punishes Poland
Most for her subjects, indeed, he'll keep punishing
If you, Pole, will not ever come to your senses.

— "Satire III. On Burdens and Oppressions of Peasants in Poland"
