= Kamila Tuszyńska =

Kamila Tuszyńska – PhD in humanities (literary, linguistics, culture and media studies), a narratologist, researcher in media studies and comics theoretician.

A lecturer, speaker, columnist and peer reviewer for "Zeszyty Komiksowe" [Comic Books], journal co-financed by the Ministry of Culture and National Heritage of the Republic of Poland; a member of the editorial staff of "Napis" magazine published by the Institute of Literary Research of the Polish Academy of Sciences (IBL PAN).

An author of articles and papers about comics and an author of the very first book (Narracja w powieści graficznej, Warsaw, Wydawnictwo Naukowe PWN [Polish Scientific Publishers PWN], 2015, ISBN 9788301185527; [Narratology of Graphic Novels: an Introduction]), exclusively devoted to narrative strategies in American and European graphic novels, in which she comments on the 371 original source texts from the research areas from the USA, Western Europe, Central and Eastern Europe and proposes brand new research tools, terms and concepts.

== Career ==
She defended a doctoral dissertation entitled Narrative strategies in comics. Between elite and popular culture at the Department of Rhetoric and Media, University of Warsaw.

A member of the Third Regions of Literature Studies Group affiliated with the Polish Academy of Sciences (PAN) and of the Laboratory of Occasional and Applied Literature, University of Warsaw, where her subject matter is comics.

As a narratologist, she is a member of the European Narratology Network (ENN) and of the International Society for the Study of Narrative (ISSN).

As a comics theoretician, she is the only one Polish member of the International Bande Dessinée Society (IBDS), the Nordic Network for Comics Research (NNCORE) and of the Comics Studies Society (CSS),

A speaker at international comics conferences, including the Comic Con (California).

For years, in various institutions she has been conducting thesis seminars and original courses, such as: the poetics of comics, verbal-and-visual workshops, artistic and applied narratives, writing on the Internet: theory and practice, workshops for columnists, journalism and press workshops, as well as local and environmental media.

Featured as an expert in the media, including Polish television: TVP Info, TVP Kultura, radio: Tok FM, Czwórka Polskie Radio, Trójka - Program Trzeci Polskiego Radia, Program 1 Polskiego Radia, Program 2 Polskiego Radia, Radio RDC, Kampus and press: Newsweek, Gazeta Prawna, bankier.pl, NaTemat.pl.
