= Adam Sędziwój Czarnkowski =

Polish nobleman

- Coat of arms: Nałęcz
- Born: 1555
- Died: 1628 (aged 72–73); Kalisz
- Family: Czarnkowski
- Wife: Jadwiga Iwańska z Tomic; Elżbieta Zborowska; Katarzyna Leszczyńska
- Issue: Kazimierz Franciszek Czarnkowski; Teresa Konstancja Czarnkowska
- Father: Wojciech Sędziwój Czarnkowski
- Mother: Jadwiga Sierpska z Gulczewa

Adam Sędziwój Czarnkowski, of the Nałęcz coat-of-arms (1555–1628) was a Polish nobleman (szlachcic).

Adam was voivode of Łęczyca Voivodeship, participant of King Stefan Batory`s wars against Muscovy, member of the Sejm, general starost of Greater Poland from 1593 to 1628. He serves as mediator during the Zebrzydowski Rebellion. In 1606–09 he participated in wars against Turkey and Sweden.
