= Leszczyński =

Polish noble family and royal house

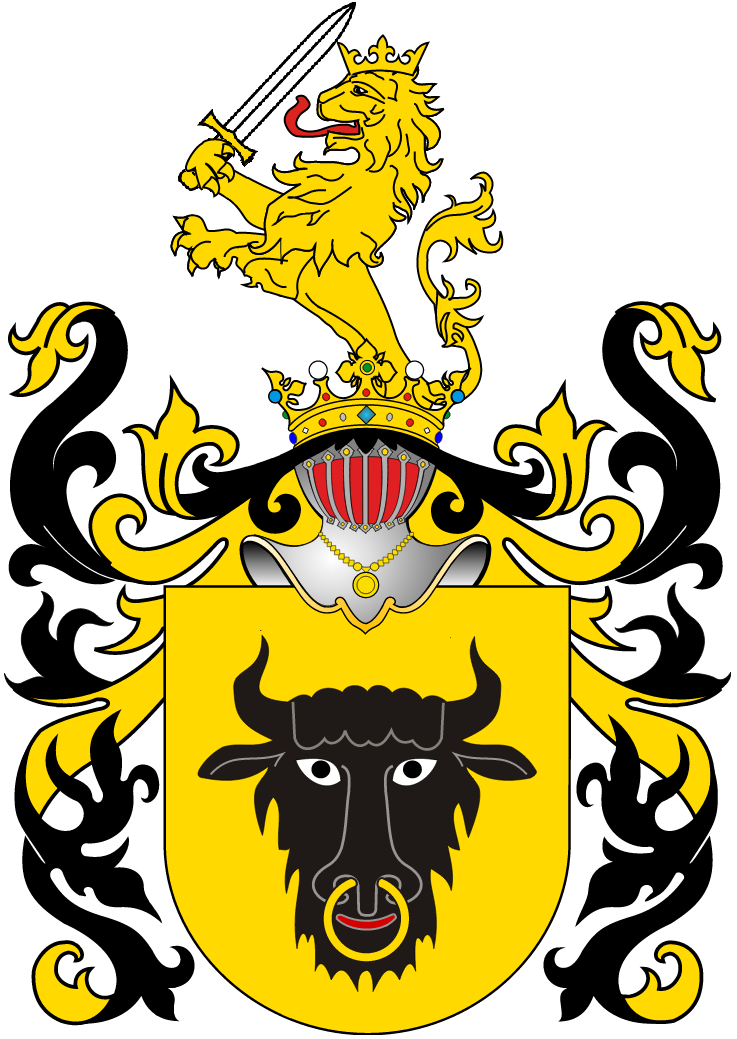
- Wieniawa
- Country: Poland, France
- Founded: 1704 Free election
- Final ruler: Stanisław I (in Poland); Maria Leszczyńska (in France)
- Titles: King of Poland; Grand Duke of Lithuania; Grand Duke of Ruthenia; Grand Duke of Prussia; Grand Duke of Masovia; Grand Duke of Samogitia; Grand Duke of Livonia; Grand Duke of Smolensk; Grand Duke of Severia; Grand Duke of Chernihiv; Duke of Lorraine; Queen consort of France and Navarre; Count of the Holy Roman Empire
- Estates: France, Poland, Lithuania, Ukraine, Belarus

The House of Leszczyński (/lɛʃˈtʃɪnski/ lesh-CHIN-skee, Polish: [lɛˈʂtʂɨj̃skʲi]; plural: Leszczyńscy, feminine form: Leszczyńska) was a prominent Polish noble family. They were magnates in the Polish–Lithuanian Commonwealth and later became the royal family of Poland.

== History ==
The Leszczyński family was a magnate family. In 1473, Rafał Leszczyński obtained from Emperor Frederick III the title of count. This title was conferred on "the entire family". The last representative of the main family, Stanisław Leszczyński, King of Poland, Grand Duke of Lithuania and later Duke of Lorraine, died in 1766.

The family name derives from Leszczyna, now a suburb of Leszno, Greater Poland. The Leszczyński family obtained the title of count of Leszno in the Holy Roman Empire. The family had its greatest importance in the late 16th and early 17th centuries, when they were ardent supporters of Calvinism and turned their estates of Leszno and Baranów Sandomierski into major centres of the Polish Reformed Church.

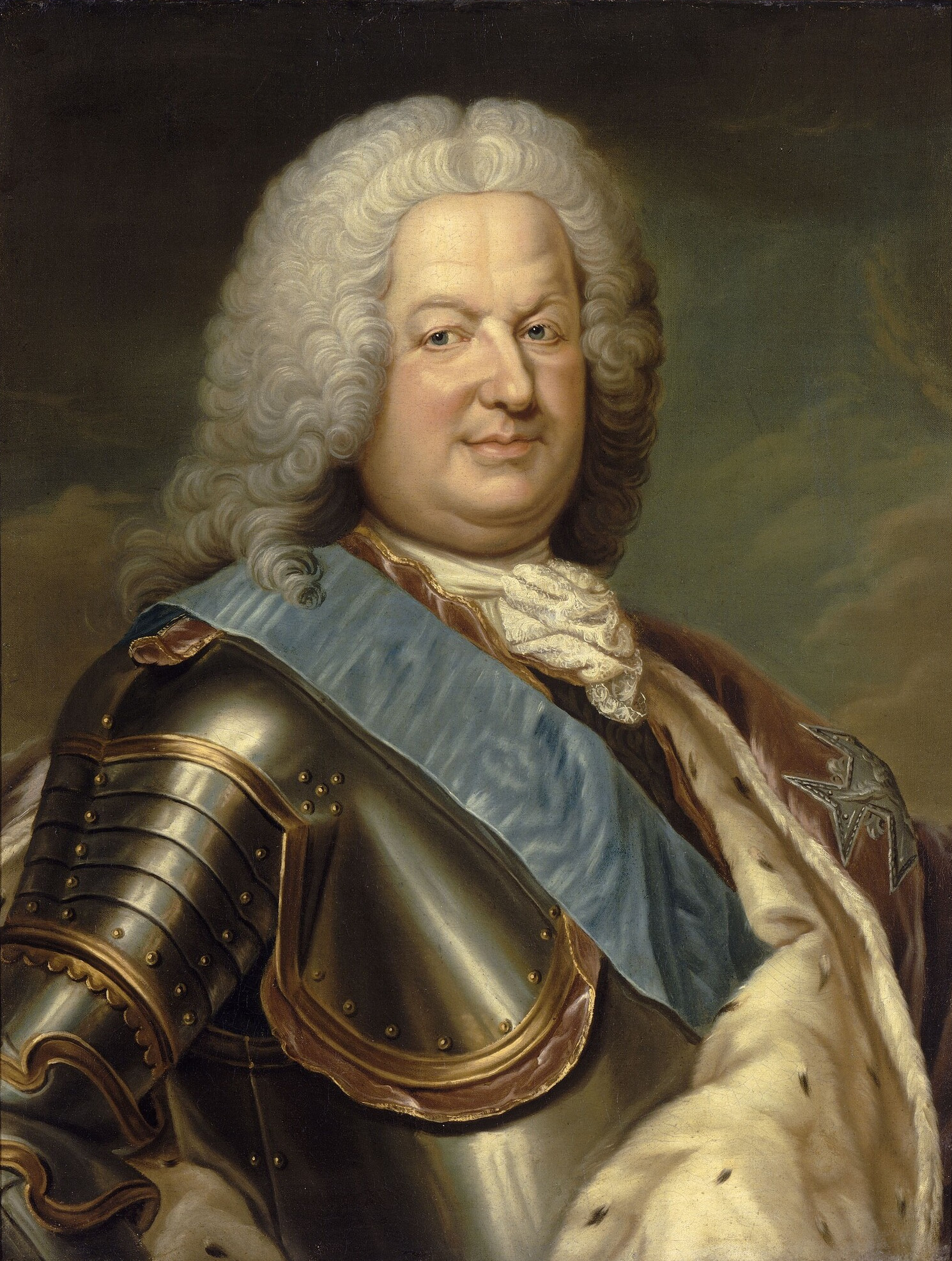
Stanislaw I Leszczyński

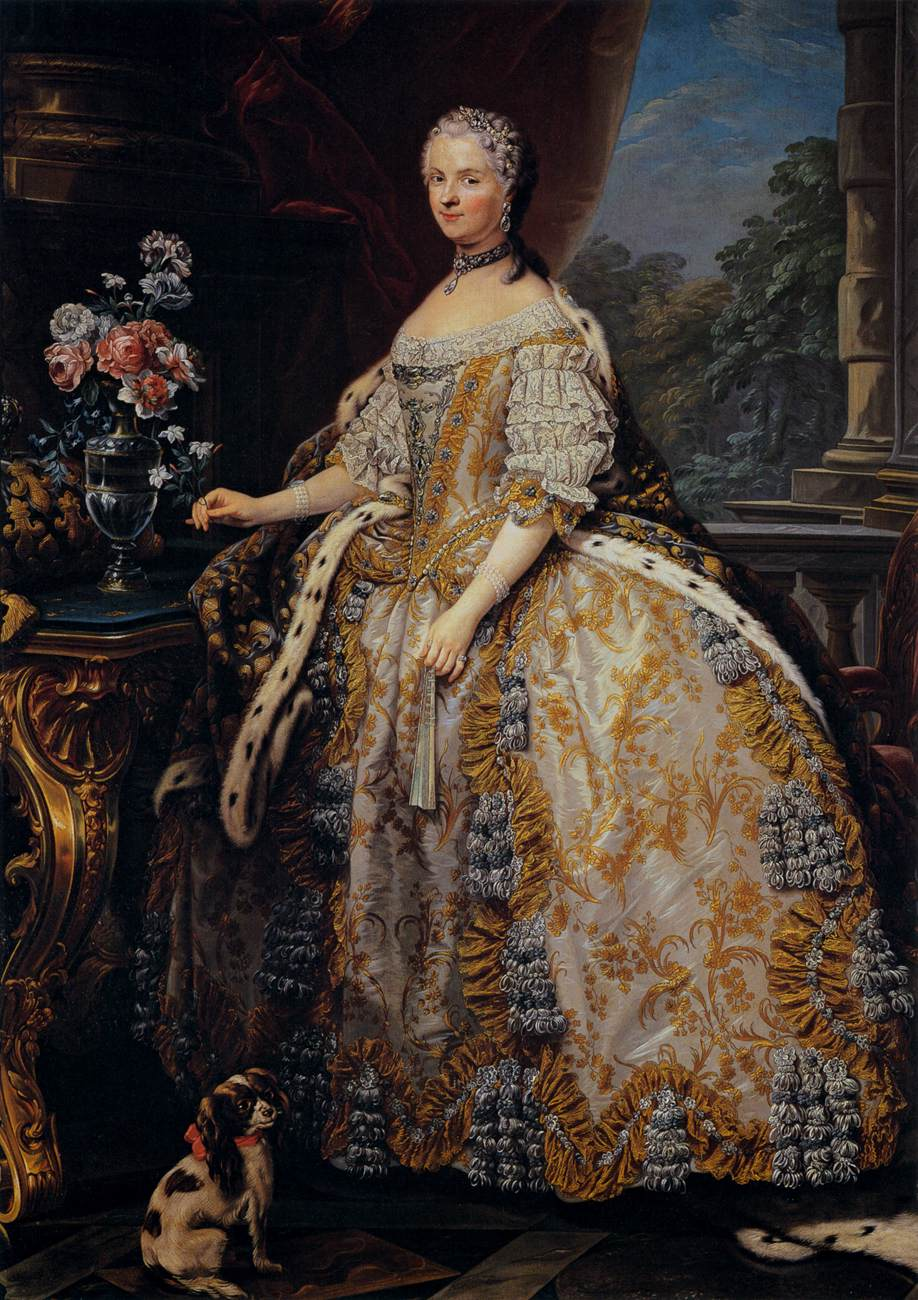
Maria Leszczyńska

There is another unrelated Leszczyński family with the Abdank coat of arms.

== Coat of arms and motto ==
The Leszczyński family used the Clan Wieniawa arms, and their motto was Qui Lescynsciorum genus ignorat, Poloniae ignorat.

Coat of Arms of King Stanisław I Leszczyński

Coat of Arms of Stanisław I Leszczyński as King of Poland, Grand Duke of Lithuania, and Duke of Lorraine

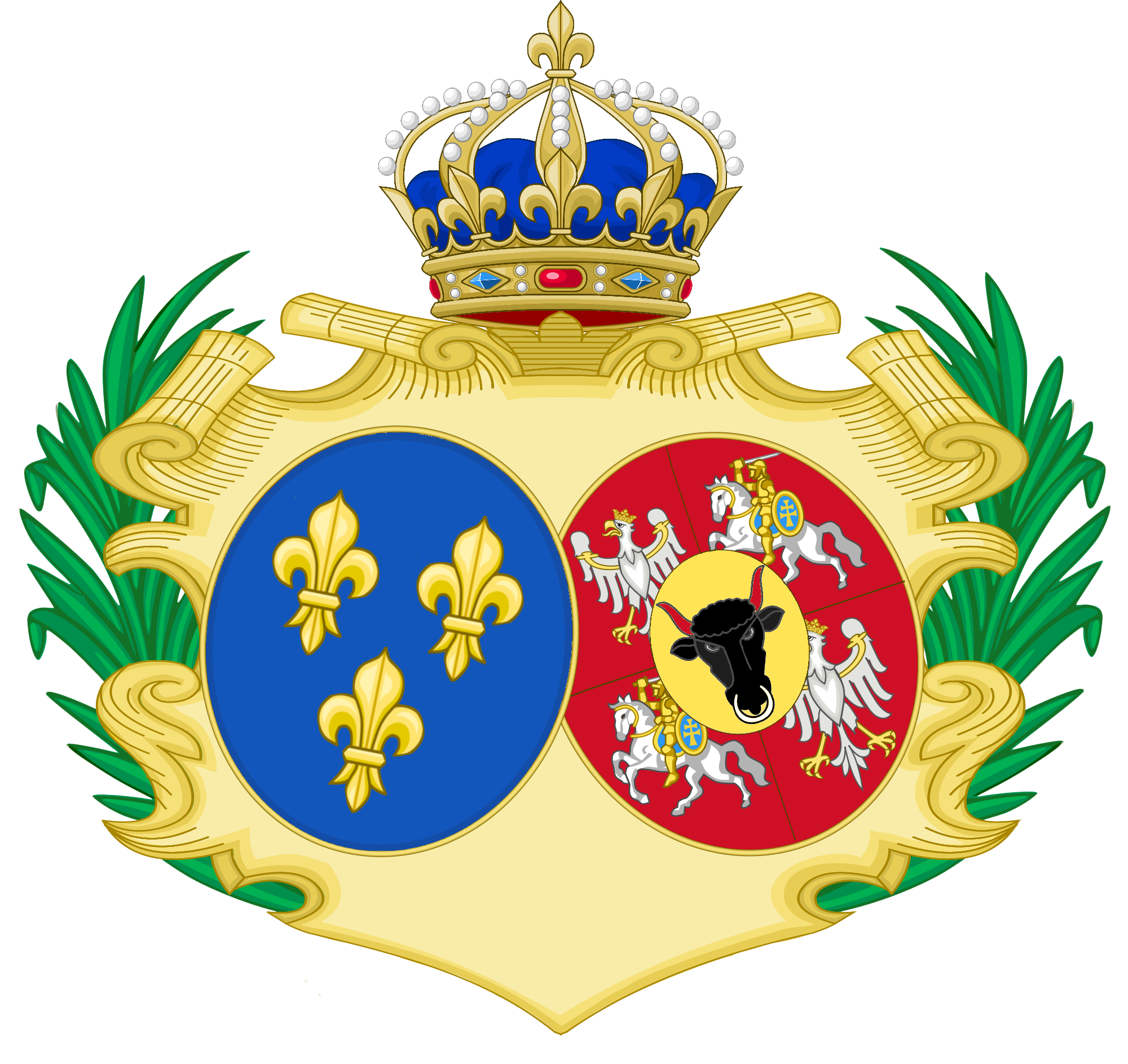
Coat of Arms of Maria Leszczyńska as Queen of France

== Notable family members ==
- Rafał Leszczyński (died 1441), Podkomorzy of Kalisz, general starost of Wielkopolska, progenitor of the Leszczyński family
- Rafał Leszczyński (c. 1526–1592), Voivode of Brześć Kujawski Voivodeship and castellan of Śrem
- Wacław Leszczyński (1576–1628), Voivode of Kalisz Voivodship, Great Chancellor of the Crown
- Rafał Leszczyński (1579–1636), Voivode of Belz Voivodship, leader of Polish Calvinists
- Jan Leszczyński (1603–1678), Great Chancellor of the Crown
- Wacław Leszczyński (1605–1666), Bishop of Warmia, Primate of Poland
- Przecław Leszczyński (1605–1670), Voivode of Dorpat Voivodship
- Andrzej Leszczyński (1606–1651), Palatine of Dorpat Voivodship
- Andrzej Leszczyński (1608–1658), Primate of Poland, Great Chancellor of the Crown
- Bogusław Leszczyński (1614–1659), Grand Treasurer and Deputy Chancellor of the Crown
- Jan Leszczyński (died 1657), Bishop of Kijów (Kyiv, also Kiev)
- Samuel Leszczyński (1637–1676), poet, Voivode of Dorpat Voivodship
- Rafał Leszczyński (1650–1703), Grand Treasurer of the Crown
- Stanisław Leszczyński (1677–1766), King of Poland and later Duke of Lorraine, married Catherine Opalińska
- Maria Leszczyńska (1703–1768), Queen of France, married to Louis XV

== Famous descendants ==
Among the descendants of Stanislaw Leszczyński were four Kings of France and Navarre, two Kings of the Two Sicilies, two Kings of Etruria, two Kings of Italy (simultaneously one Emperor of Ethiopia and one King of the Albanians), six Kings and one Queen of Spain, two Emperors of Brazil (simultaneously one King of Portugal and Algarve), five Kings and one Queen of Portugal and Algarve, one Emperor of Austria (simultaneously one King of Hungary), five Kings of Saxony, four Kings of Belgium, one King of Bavaria, two Tsars of Bulgaria, three Kings of Romania, one King of Yugoslavia, two Princes of Lichtenstein, two Grand Dukes and two Grand Duchess of Luxembourg, several Queen consorts and several titular Kings.

=== Tree ===
- Stanisław Leszczyński, married Catherine Opalińska
  - Maria Leszczyńska, married Louis XV of France
    - Louise Élisabeth of France, married Philip, Duke of Parma
      - Princess Isabella of Parma, married Joseph II, Holy Roman Emperor
      - Ferdinand, Duke of Parma, married Archduchess Maria Amalia of Austria
        - Princess Carolina of Parma, married Prince Maximilian of Saxony (descendant of King John III Sobieski)
          - Princess Maria Anna of Saxony (1799–1832)
            - Archduchess Auguste Ferdinande of Austria
              - Ludwig III of Bavaria
          - Frederick Augustus II of Saxony
          - John of Saxony
            - Princess Elisabeth of Saxony
              - Margherita of Savoy
                - Victor Emmanuel III of Italy
                  - Umberto II of Italy
                  - Giovanna of Italy
                    - Simeon Saxe-Coburg-Gotha
            - Albert of Saxony
            - Frederick Augustus I of Saxony
            - George, King of Saxony
              - Frederick Augustus III of Saxony
              - Princess Maria Josepha of Saxony (1867–1944)
                - Charles I of Austria
                  - Otto von Habsburg
          - Maria Josepha Amalia, Queen of Spain
        - Louis I of Etruria
          - Charles II, Duke of Parma
      - Maria Luisa, Queen of Spain
        - Carlota Joaquina of Spain
          - Miguel I of Portugal
            - Infanta Maria Josepha of Portugal
              - Marie-Adélaïde, Grand Duchess of Luxembourg
              - Charlotte, Grand Duchess of Luxembourg
                - Jean, Grand Duke of Luxembourg
              - Elisabeth of Bavaria, Queen of Belgium
                - Leopold III of Belgium
                  - Baudouin of Belgium
                  - Albert II of Belgium
                    - Philippe of Belgium, married to Queen Mathilde of Belgium, the daughter of Countess Anna Maria Komorowska (the current reigning King of Belgium)
                  - Princess Joséphine Charlotte of Belgium
                    - Henri, Grand Duke of Luxembourg (the current reigning Grand Duke of Luxembourg)
            - Infanta Maria Theresa of Portugal
              - Archduchess Elisabeth Amalie of Austria
                - Franz Joseph II, Prince of Liechtenstein
                  - Hans-Adam II, Prince of Liechtenstein (the current reigning Prince of Liechtenstein)
          - Pedro I of Brazil
            - Pedro II of Brazil
            - Maria II of Portugal
              - Pedro V of Portugal
              - Luís I of Portugal
                - Carlos I of Portugal
                  - Manuel II of Portugal
              - Infanta Antónia of Portugal
                - Ferdinand I of Romania
                  - Carol II of Romania
                    - Michael I of Romania
                      - Margareta of Romania
                  - Maria of Yugoslavia
                    - Peter II of Yugoslavia
        - Maria Luisa of Spain, Duchess of Lucca
        - Ferdinand VII of Spain
          - Isabella II of Spain
        - María Isabella of Spain
          - Ferdinand II of the Two Sicilies
            - Francis II of the Two Sicilies
            - Prince Alfonso, Count of Caserta
              - Prince Carlos of Bourbon-Two Sicilies
                - Princess María de las Mercedes of Bourbon-Two Sicilies
                  - Juan Carlos I of Spain
                    - Felipe VI of Spain (the current reigning King of Spain)
        - Ferdinand VII of Spain
          - Isabella II of Spain
            - Alfonso XII of Spain
              - Alfonso XIII of Spain
    - Louis Ferdinand
      - Louis XVI of France
        - Louis XVII of France
      - Louis XVIII of France
      - Charles X of France
        - Louis Antoine, Duke of Angoulême
          - Princess Louise Marie Thérèse of Artois
            - Robert I, Duke of Parma
              - Marie Louise of Bourbon-Parma
                - Boris III of Bulgaria

== Palaces ==
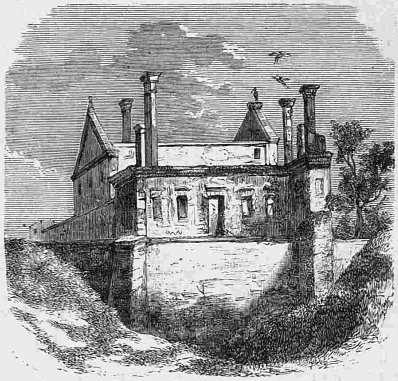
Ruins of the castle in Czartorysk

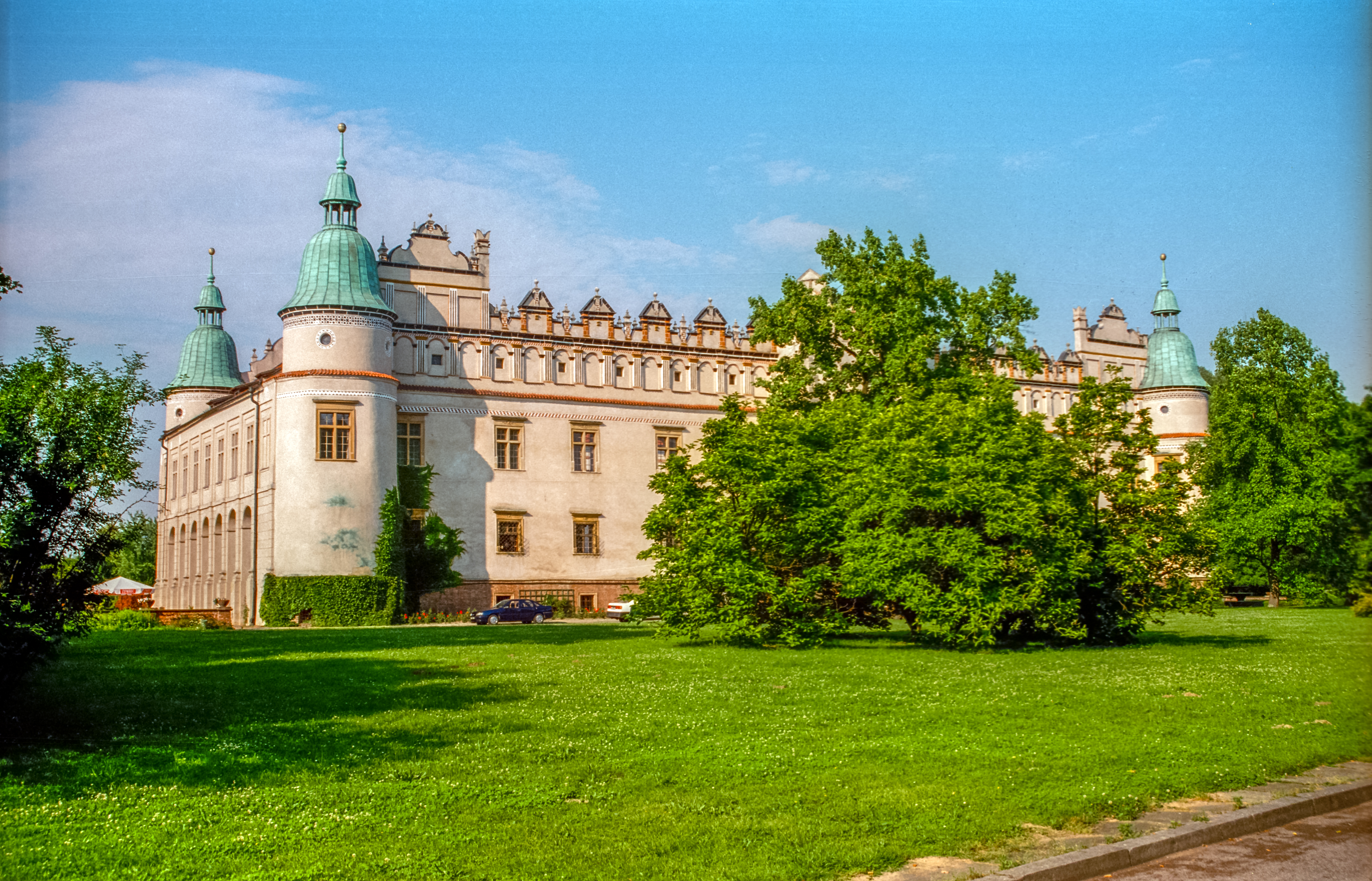
Castle in Baranow Sandomierski

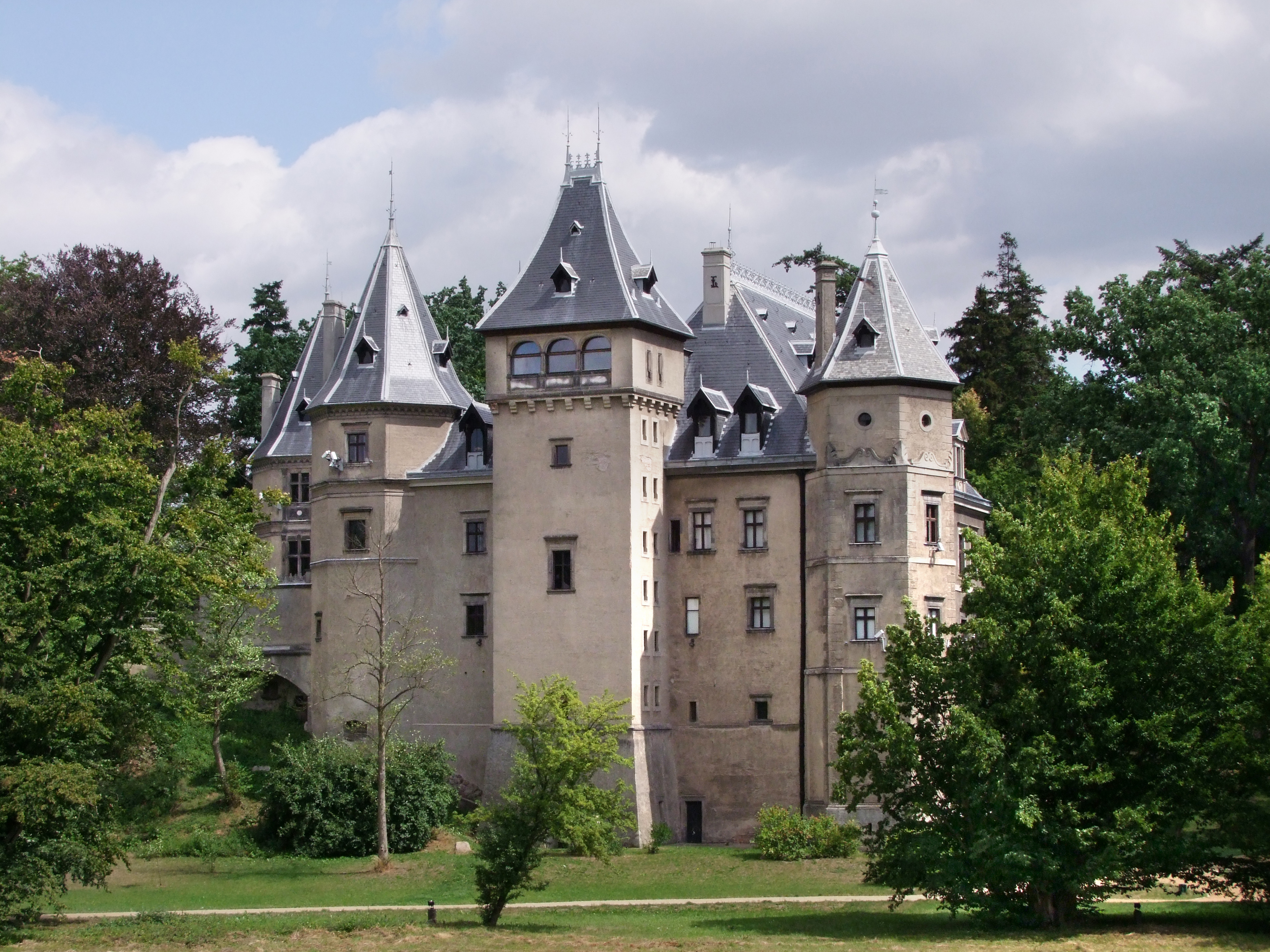
Castle in Gołuchów

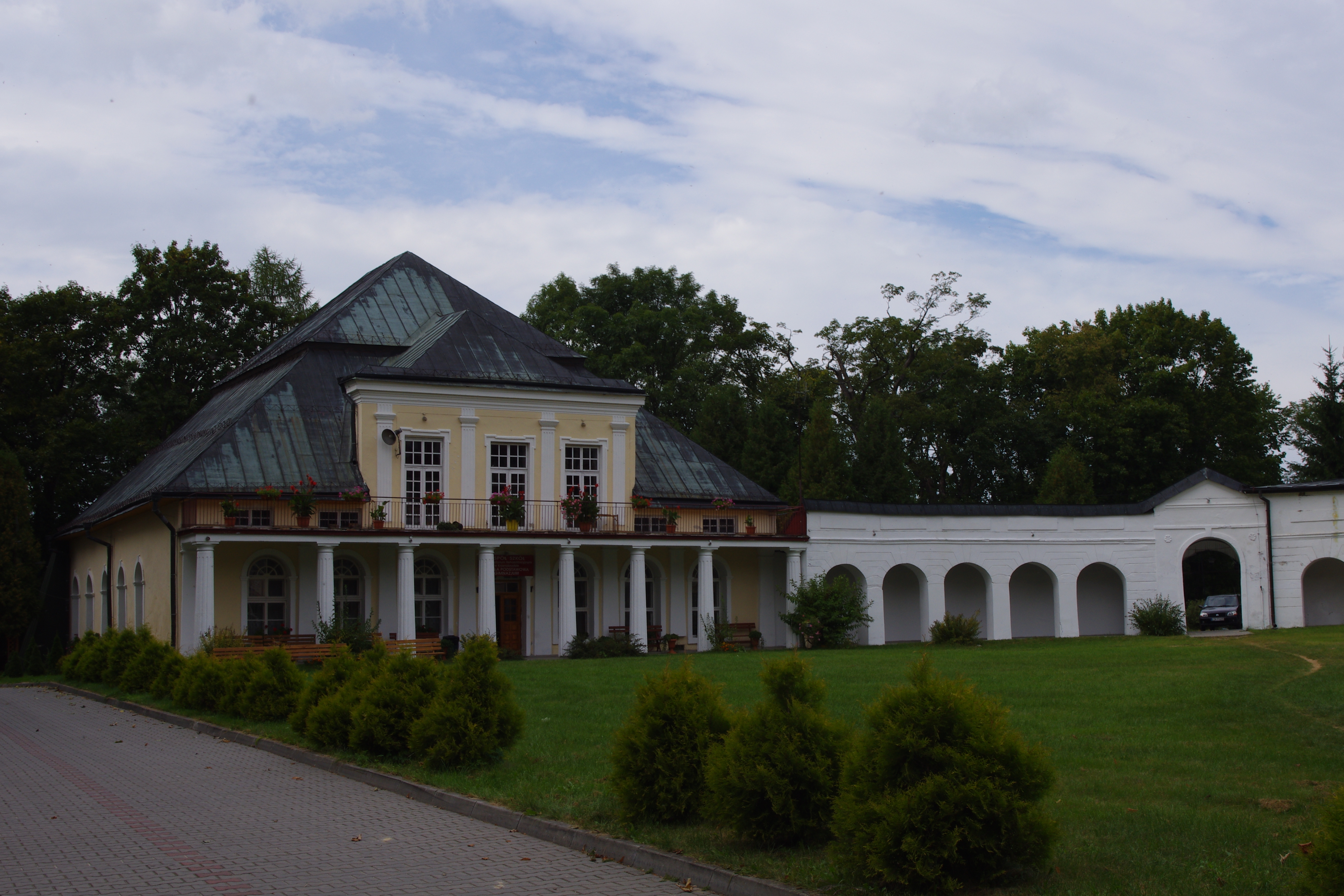
Palace in Krasnobród

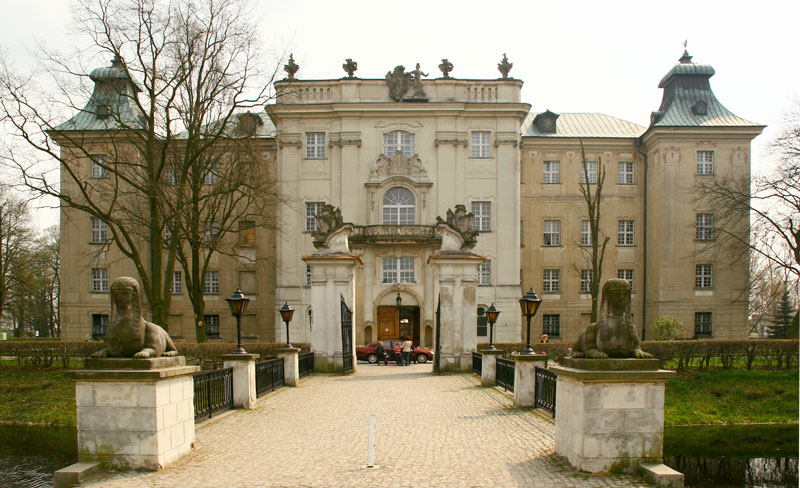
Castle in Rydzyna was rebuilt in 1700 by Pompeo Ferrari on his order.

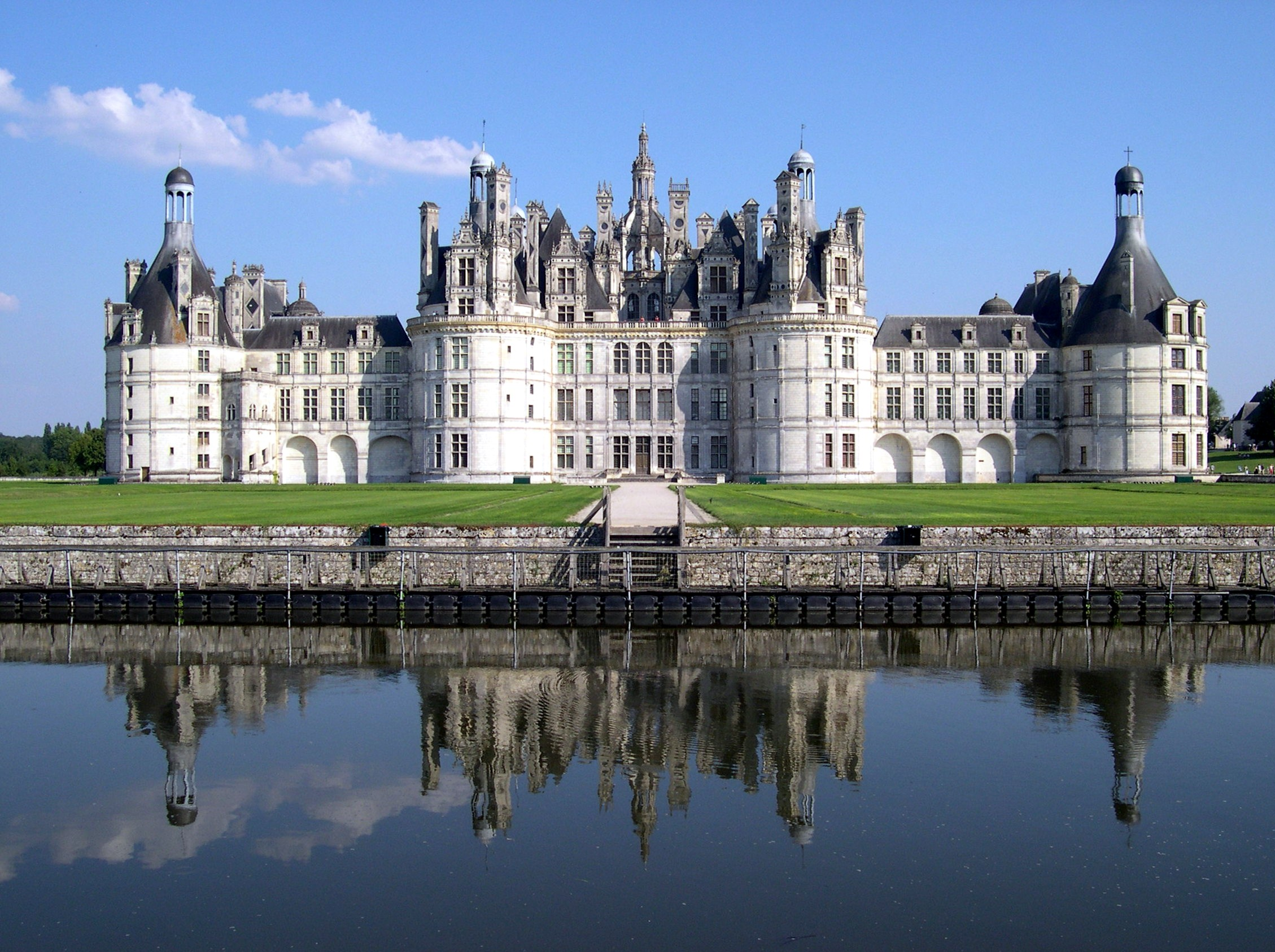
Château de Chambord, where Stanisław Leszczyński lived between 1725 and 1733.

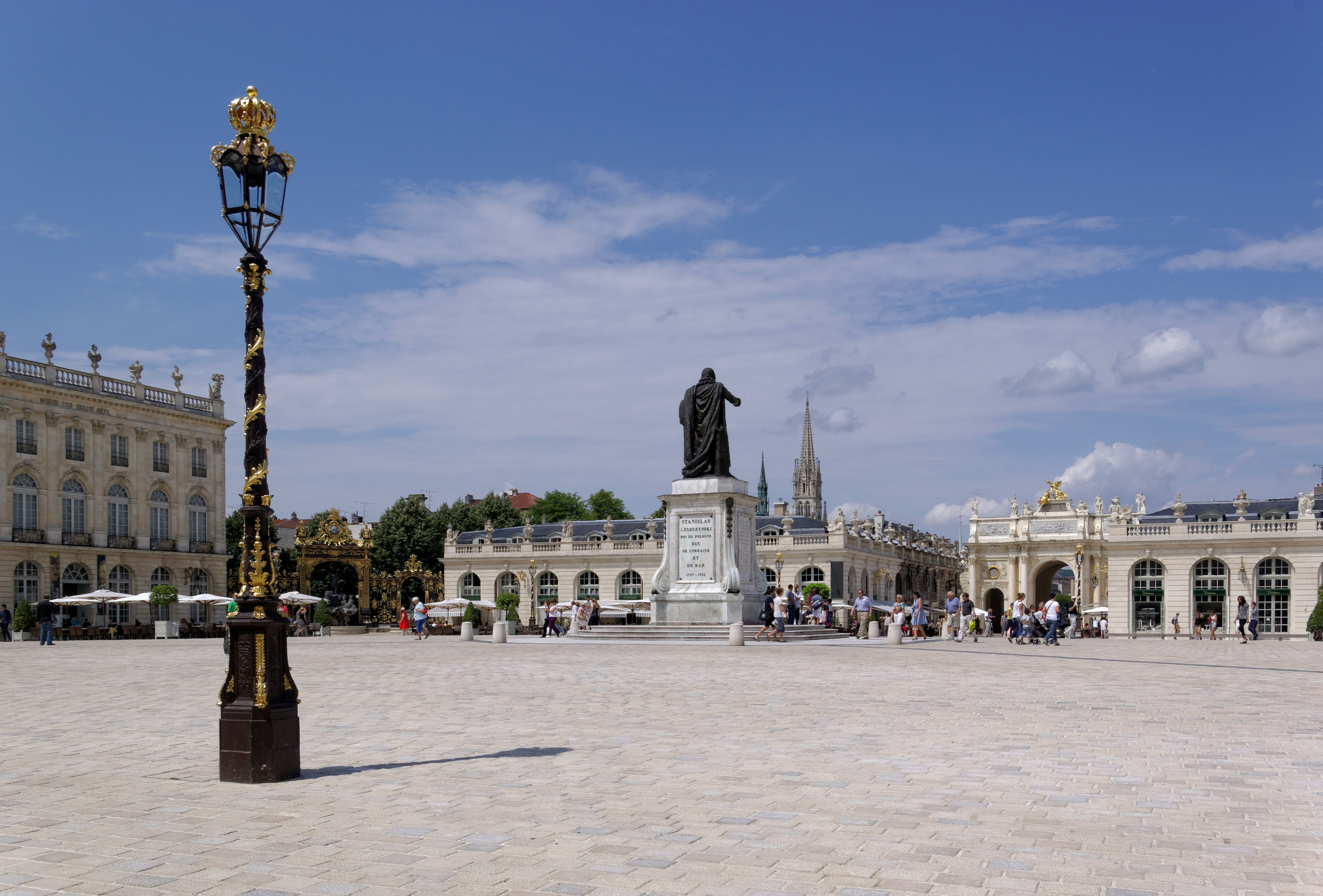
Place Stanislas in Nancy was constructed between 1751 and 1755 .

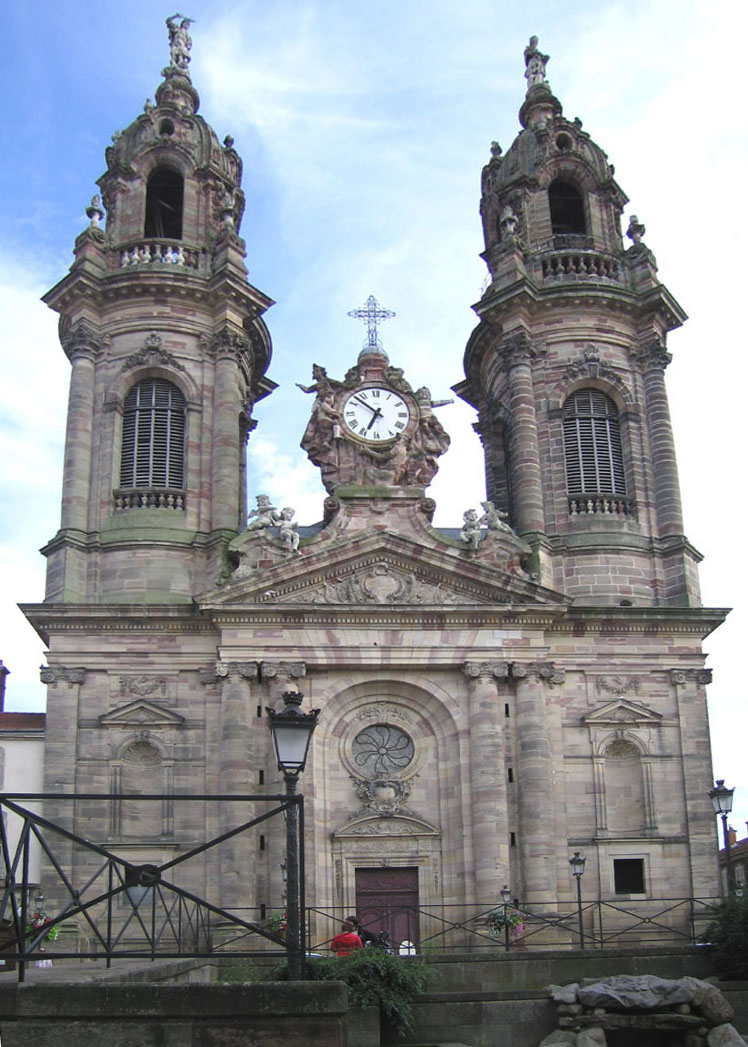
Église Saint-Jacques in Lunéville was established by him in 1745.

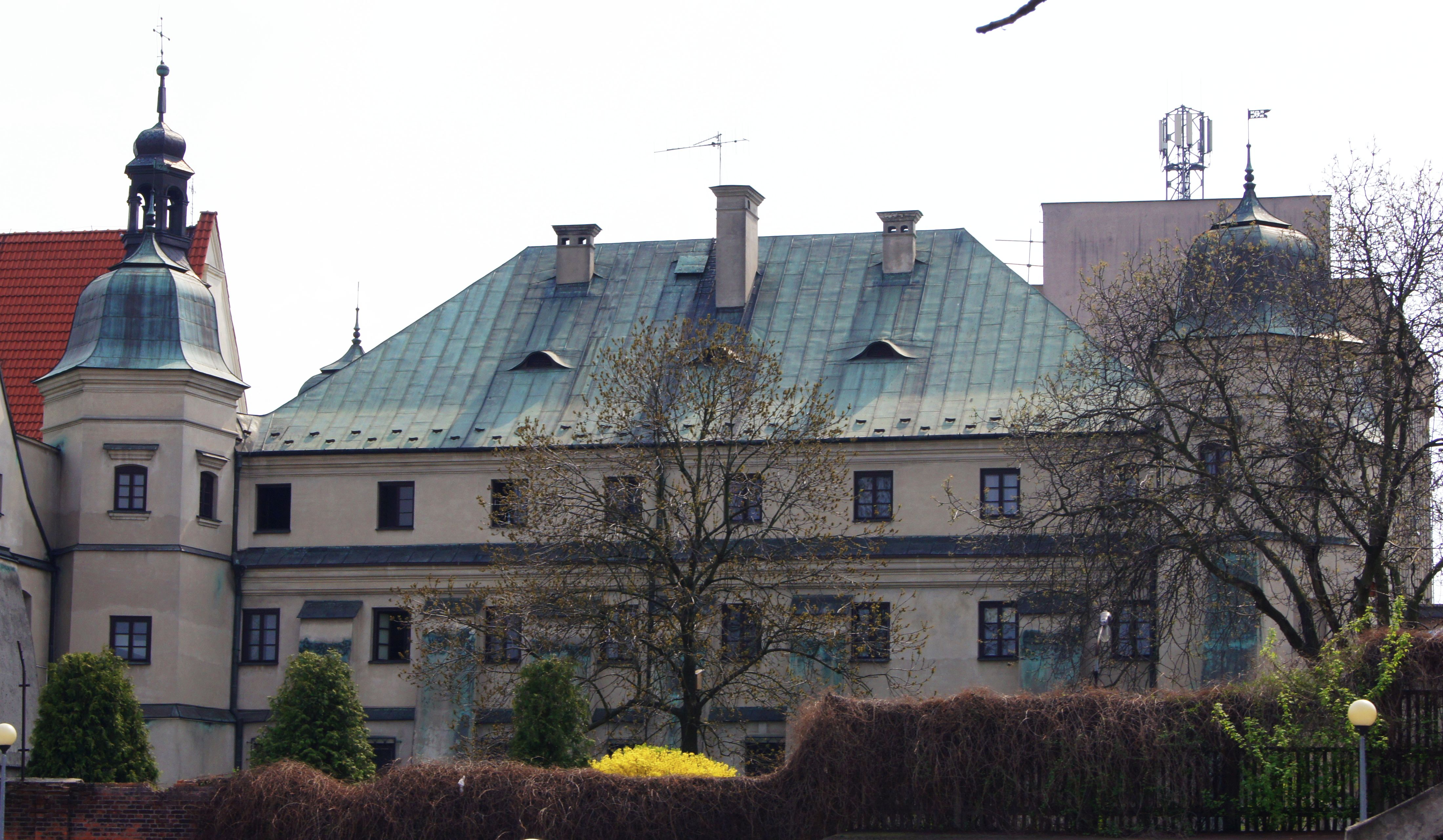
Manor House of Rafał Leszczyński in Lublin
