= Rafał Leszczyński =

Rafał Leszczyński may refer to:

- Rafał Leszczyński (bishop of Płock), served 1523 to 1527 as diocesan bishop of Płock
- Rafał Leszczyński (1526–1592), sejm marshal, voivode of the Brześć Kujawski, supporter of the "executionist movement" and Reformation
- Rafał Leszczyński (1579–1636), voivode of Kalisz and Belz, one of the leaders of the "executionist movement" (ruch egzekucyjny)
- Rafał Leszczyński (1650–1703), father of King of Poland Stanisław I Leszczyński
- Rafał Leszczyński (footballer) (born 1992), Polish goalkeeper
