= Stanisław Leszczyński =

King of Poland (1704–1709, 1733–1736)

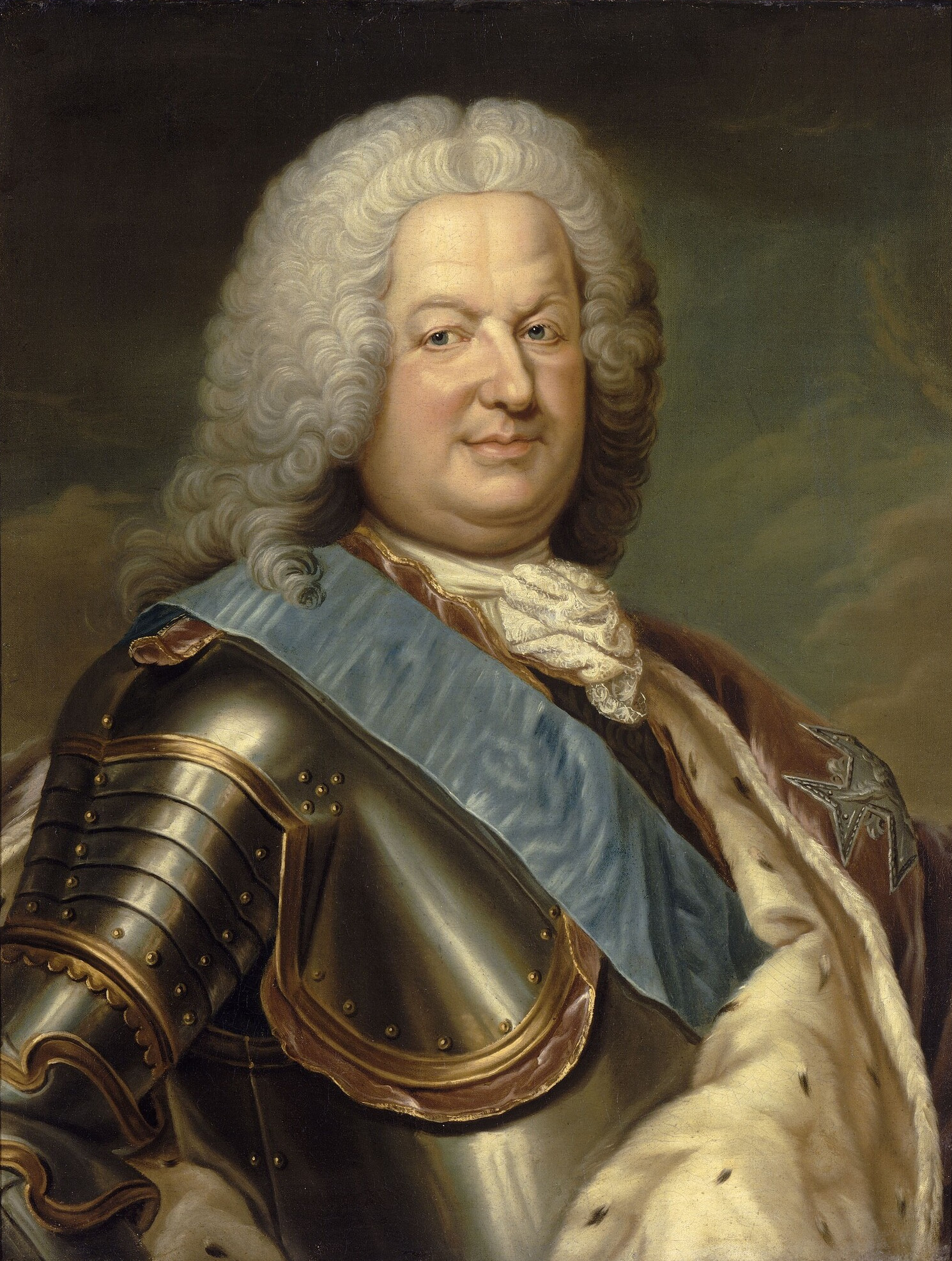
- Portrait by Jean Girardet

King of Poland Grand Duke of Lithuania
- 1st reign: 12 July 1704 – 8 July 1709 (Note: Contested by Augustus II until 13 October 1706.)
- Coronation: 4 October 1705
- Predecessor: Augustus II the Strong
- Successor: Augustus II the Strong
- 2nd reign: 12 September 1733 – 26 January 1736 (Note: Contested by Augustus III of Poland since 5 October 1733.)
- Predecessor: Augustus II the Strong
- Successor: Augustus III

Duke of Lorraine and Bar
- Reign: 9 July 1737 – 23 February 1766
- Predecessor: Francis III Stephen
- Successor: Escheated into the Kingdom of France
- Born: 20 October 1677; Lwów, Polish–Lithuanian Commonwealth
- Died: 23 February 1766 (aged 88); Lunéville, Duchy of Lorraine, Holy Roman Empire
- Burial: Wawel Cathedral, Kraków
- Spouse: Catherine Opalińska (m. 1698; died 1747)
- Issue: Anna Leszczyńska; Marie, Queen of France
Names
- Stanisław Bogusław Leszczyński
- House: Leszczyński
- Father: Rafał Leszczyński
- Mother: Anna Jabłonowska
- Religion: Roman Catholicism
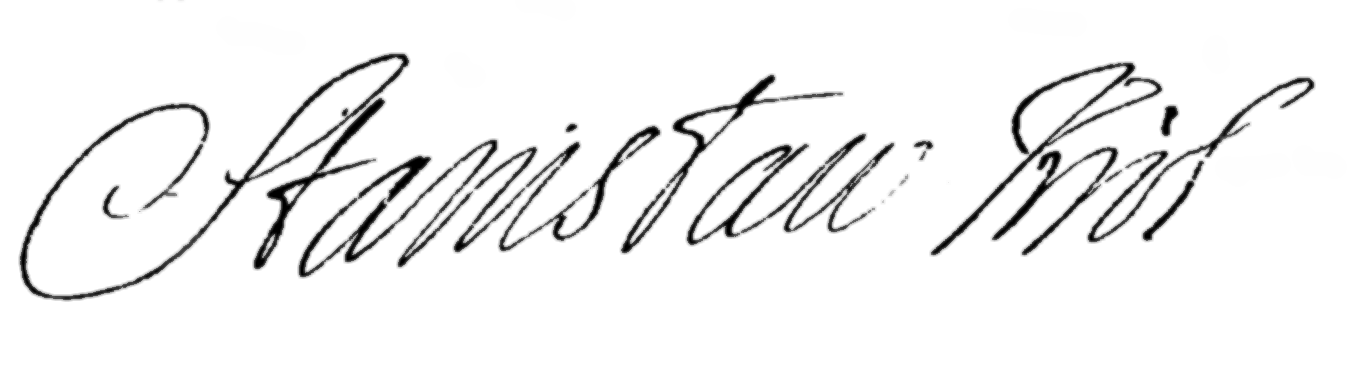
- Signature

Stanisław I Leszczyński (Note: Polish pronunciation: [staˈɲiswaf lɛʂˈt͡ʂɨj̃skʲi]; Lithuanian: Stanislovas Leščinskis Lithuanian pronunciation: [staˈɲɪsɫɔvas lɛʃˈtʃɪŋskʲɪs]; French: Stanislas Leczinski French pronunciation: [stanislas lɛɡzɛ̃ski]) (Stanisław Bogusław; 20 October 1677 – 23 February 1766), also Anglicised and Latinised as Stanislaus, was twice King of Poland and Grand Duke of Lithuania, and at various times Prince of Deux-Ponts, Duke of Bar and Duke of Lorraine.

During the Great Northern War, multiple candidates had emerged after the death of John III Sobieski for the elective kingship of Poland (which also included the Grand Duchy of Lithuania as part of the Poland-Lithuanian Commonwealth). Backed by powerful neighbors in Russia and Austria, the Sejm elected Augustus the Strong, Elector of Saxony to succeed John III in 1697 as August II. Russia's primary antagonist in the Great Northern War, Sweden had supported Stanisław Leszczyński for the throne, and after defeating a combined army of Saxon and Polish-Lithuanian forces, deposed Augustus II the Strong and installed Leszczyński as Stanisław in 1704.

In 1709, Charles XII of Sweden, Stanisław's main supporter, suffered a defeat by the Russians at the Battle of Poltava, and was subsequently driven into exile in the Ottoman Empire. As a result, Augustus II returned to the throne, and while Charles served his exile in the Ottoman Empire, Stanisław accepted the rule of Palatine Zweibrücken, a small state of the Holy Roman Empire which was in personal union with Sweden and located near the region of Alsace. After Charles's death in 1719, he moved to nearby Wissembourg in Alsace. In 1725, his daughter Marie Leszczyńska married Louis XV of France.

The death of Augustus II sparked the War of the Polish Succession in 1733. As had happened on the death of John III Sobieski, foreign intrigue and influence plagued the Sejm election. Despite the presence of Russian troops in the country, the Sejm, with support of the French, elected Stanisław to succeed Augustus II the Strong, while the Russians encouraged a group of break-away nobles to hold their own election, selecting instead Augustus III of Poland, son of Augustus II, to the kingship. War broke out almost immediately, evolving into a proxy war between the Bourbon and Habsburg dynasties and their supporters, with the Bourbon faction led by France and Spain, with their allies Sardinia and Sweden, while the Habsburg faction was led by Austria and their allies Russia, Prussia, and Saxony. After two years of fighting across the entire continent, a ceasefire was declared in 1735. Stanislaw officially abdicated in January 1736, and the Peace of Vienna was promulgated in 1738, whereby Augustus III was officially recognised as King of Poland, and Stanisław was compensated for losing the throne a second time with the duchies of Bar and Lorraine, both of which were nominally part of the Holy Roman Empire at the time.

While Duke of Lorraine, Stanisław lived out his remaining years at a country estate in Lunéville, and actively ruled Lorraine and Bar, sponsoring numerous public works projects. Nearby, Nancy, the historic capital of Lorraine, has a Place Stanislas (Stanisław Square) named in his honour, much of which was developed during his reign. He also took up political philosophy, engaging in discourse with other Enlightenment figures such as Jean Jacques Rousseau, and wrote philosophical treatises in his native Polish, making him a figure within the Polish Enlightenment. When he died in 1766, his titles passed to his son-in-law, Louis XV. His retaking of the Polish throne in 1733 formed the backdrop for Un giorno di regno, an opera by composer Giuseppe Verdi and librettist Felice Romani, which premiered in 1840.

== Early life ==
Born in Lwów (now Lviv) in 1677, he was the son of Rafał Leszczyński, voivode of Poznań Voivodeship, and Princess Anna Leszczyńska. He married Katarzyna Opalińska, by whom he had a daughter, Maria, who became Queen of France as the wife of Louis XV. In 1697, as Cup-bearer of Poland, he signed the confirmation of the articles of election of Augustus II the Strong. In 1703, he joined the Lithuanian Confederation, which the Sapiehas, with the aid of Sweden, had formed against Augustus.

== King for the first time ==
The following year, Stanisław was selected by Charles XII of Sweden after a successful Swedish invasion of Poland, to supersede Augustus II, who was hostile towards the Swedes. Leszczyński was a young man of blameless antecedents, respectable talents, and came from an ancient family, but certainly without sufficient force of character or political influence to sustain himself on such an unstable throne.

Nevertheless, with the assistance of a bribing fund and an army corps, the Swedes succeeded in procuring his election by a scratch assembly of half a dozen castellans and a few score of noblemen on 12 July 1704. A few months later, Stanisław was forced by a sudden inroad of Augustus II to seek refuge in the Swedish camp, but finally, on 24 September 1705, he was crowned king with great splendor. Charles himself supplied his nominee with a new crown and scepter in lieu of the ancient Polish regalia, which had been carried off to Saxony by Augustus. During this time, the king of Sweden sent Peter Estenberg to King Stanislaw to act as an ambassador and correspondence secretary. The Polish king's first act was to cement an alliance with Charles XII whereby the Polish–Lithuanian Commonwealth engaged to assist Sweden against the Russian tsar. Stanisław did what he could to assist his patron. Thus, he induced Ivan Mazepa, the Cossack hetman, to desert Peter the Great at the most critical period of the Great Northern War between Russia and Sweden, and Stanisław placed a small army corps at the disposal of the Swedes and was beaten in Battle of Koniecpol. However, Stanisław depended so entirely on the success of Charles' armies that after the Battle of Poltava (1709), his authority vanished. Stanisław then resided in the town of Rydzyna.

== First loss of throne ==
The vast majority of Poles hastened to repudiate Stanisław and make their peace with Augustus. Henceforth a mere pensioner of Charles XII, Stanisław accompanied Krassow's army corps in its retreat to Swedish Pomerania. On the restoration of Augustus, Stanisław abdicated the Polish Crown (though he retained the royal title) in exchange for the little Principality of Palatine Zweibrücken. In 1716, an assassination was attempted by a Saxon officer, Lacroix, but Stanisław was saved by Stanisław Poniatowski (father of the future king Stanisław August Poniatowski). Forced to leave Deux-Ponts (Zweibrücken) in 1719 after the death of Charles XII of Sweden in whose name he was Count Palatine, Stanisław Leszczyński then resided at Wissembourg in Alsace. In 1725, he had the satisfaction of seeing his daughter Maria become queen consort of Louis XV of France. From 1725 to 1733, Stanisław lived at the Château de Chambord.

== King for a second time ==
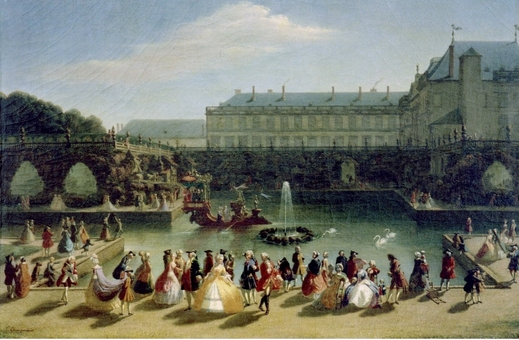
Festival at the Rocher grotto of the Château de Lunéville in 1742, painting by Laurent Charpentier

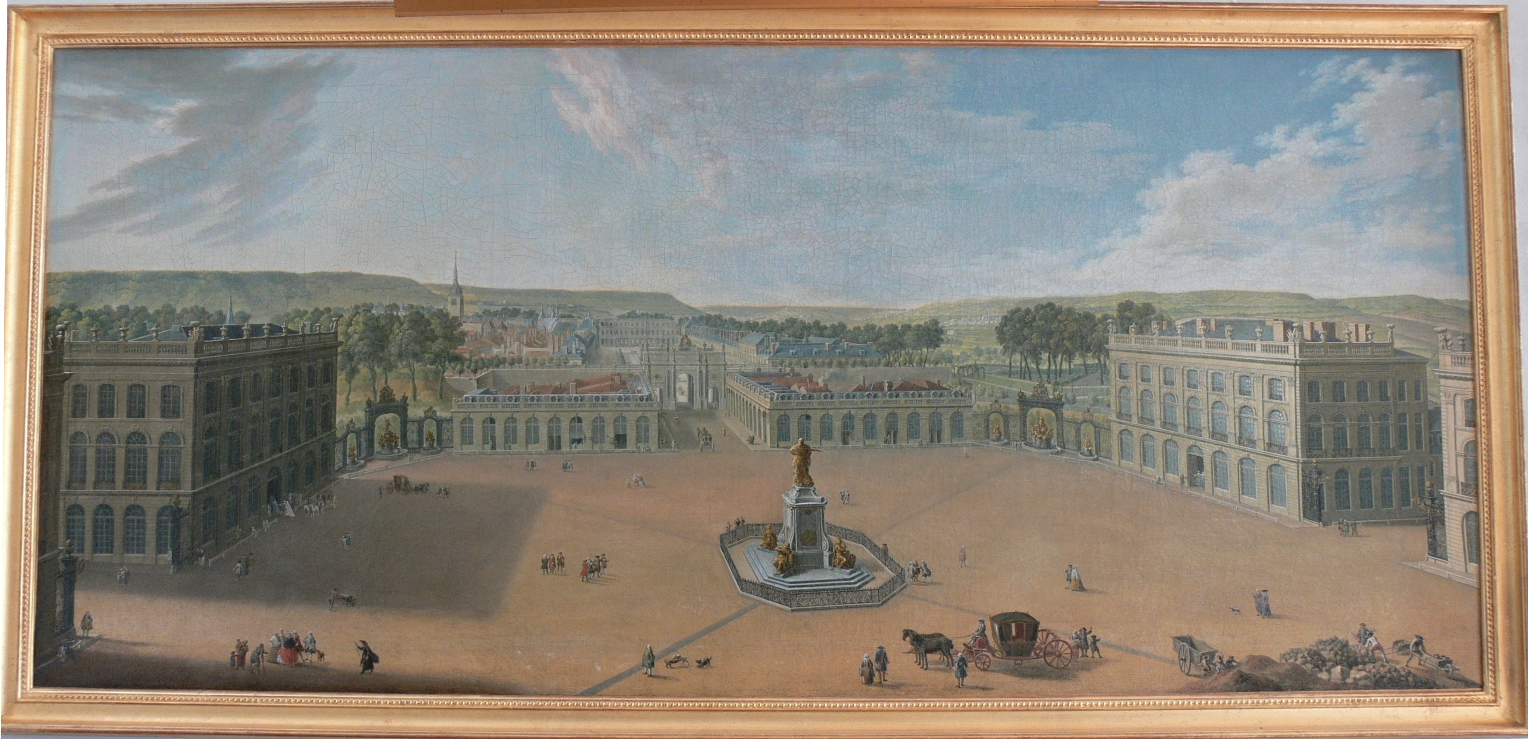
Painting of the Place Royale in Nancy c. 1760 which was constructed during his rule, later renamed Place Stanislas in his honour

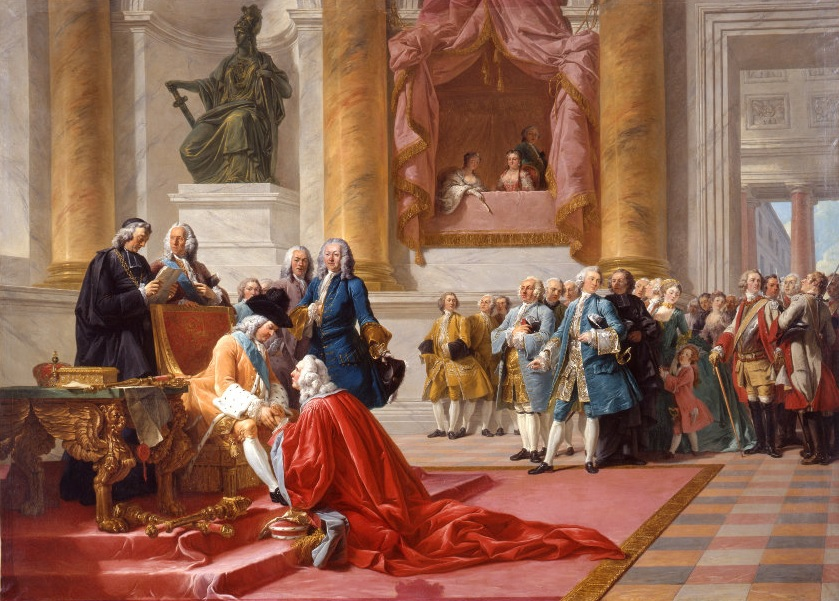
Antoine-Martin Chaumont de La Galaizière created Chancellor of Lorraine and Barrois by Stanislas I (painting by François-André Vincent, 1788

Stanislaw's son-in-law Louis XV supported his claims to the Polish throne after the death of Augustus II the Strong in 1733, which led to the War of the Polish Succession. On 11 September 1733, Stanisław himself arrived at Warsaw, having traveled night and day through central Europe disguised as a coachman. On the following day, despite many protests, Stanisław was duly elected King of Poland for the second time. However, Russia was opposed to any nominee of France and Sweden. Russia protested against his election at once, in favor of the new Elector of Saxony, son of the late king, as being the candidate of her Austrian ally.

On 30 June 1734, a Russian army of 20,000 under Peter Lacy, after proclaiming Frederick Augustus II of Saxony as king in Warsaw, proceeded to besiege Stanisław at Danzig, where he was entrenched with his partisans (including the Primate and the French and Swedish ministers) to await the relief that had been promised by France.

The siege began in October 1734. On 17 March 1735, Marshal Burkhard Christoph von Münnich superseded Peter Lacy, and on 20 May 1735, the long-expected French fleet appeared and disembarked 2,400 men on Westerplatte. A week later, this little army gallantly attempted to force the Russian entrenchments but was finally compelled to surrender. This was the first time that France and Russia had met as foes in the field. On 30 June 1735, Danzig capitulated unconditionally, after sustaining a siege of 135 days, which cost the Russians 8,000 men.

Disguised as a peasant, Stanisław had contrived to escape two days before. He reappeared at Königsberg (where he briefly met the future King Frederick the Great of Prussia), whence he issued a manifesto to his partisans which resulted in the formation of a confederation on his behalf, and the despatch of a Polish envoy to Paris to urge France to invade Saxony with at least 40,000 men. In Ukraine too, Count Nicholas Potocki kept on foot to support Stanisław a motley host of 50,000 men, which was ultimately scattered by the Russians.

== Duke of Lorraine and of Bar ==
On 26 January 1736, Stanisław again abdicated the throne but received in compensation the duchies of Lorraine and of Bar, which were to revert to France on his death. In 1738, he sold his estates of Rydzyna and Leszno to Count (later Prince) Alexander Joseph Sułkowski. He settled at Lunéville, where he held court at the Château de Lunéville, which became a centre of the arts and culture, drawing a number of personalities of the Enlightenment, including Madame Émilie du Châtelet. In Nancy in 1750 he founded both the Académie de Stanislas and Bibliothèque municipale de Nancy, and devoted himself for the rest of his life to science and philanthropy, engaging most notably in controversy with Jean-Jacques Rousseau. He also published Głos wolny wolność ubezpieczający, one of the most important political treatises of the Polish Enlightenment.

His court painter was André Joly.

== Death ==
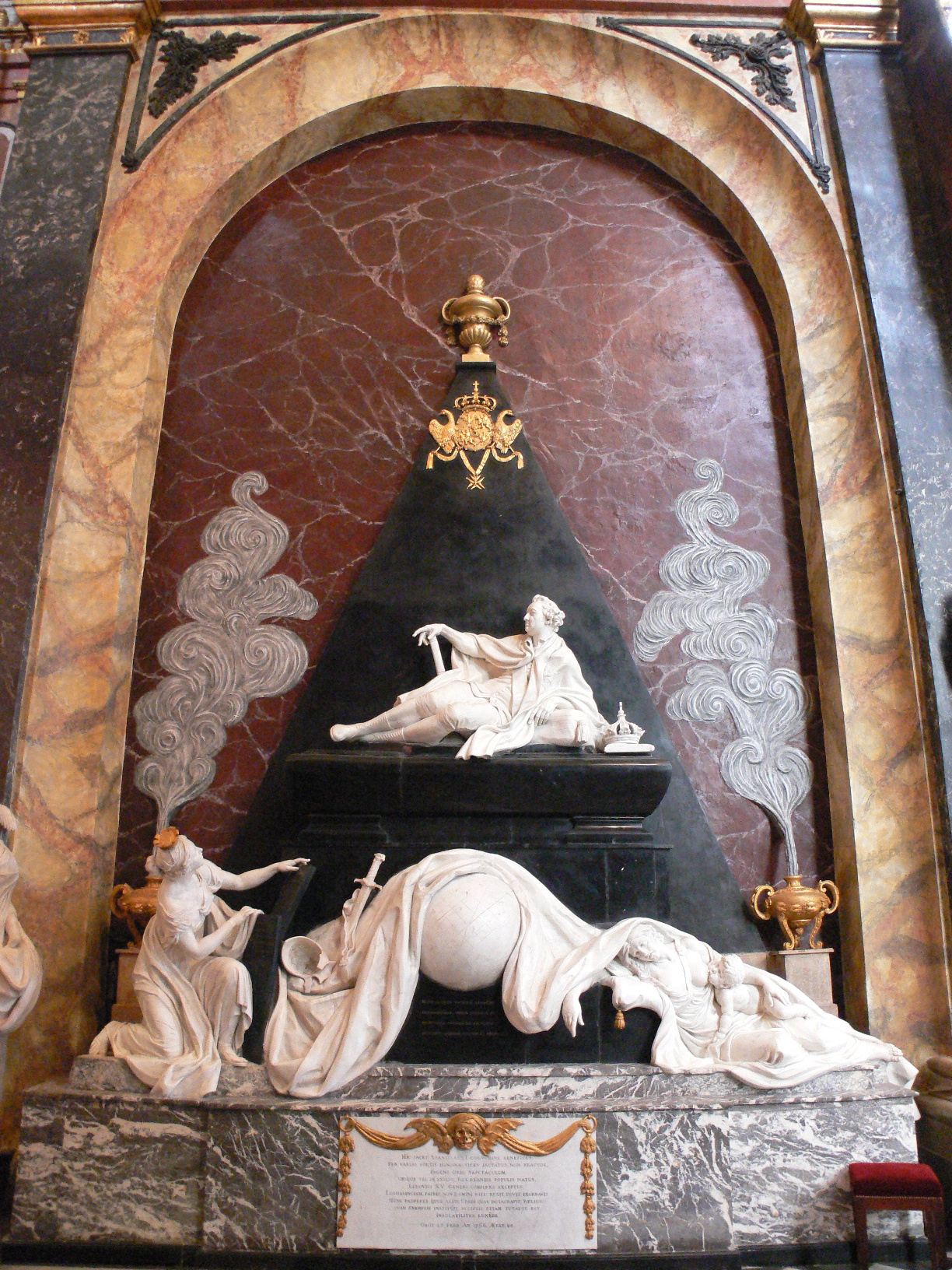
Tomb of the king in Bonsecours Church, Nancy, France

Stanisław was still alive when his great-great-granddaughter, Archduchess Maria Theresa of Austria, was born in 1762. In his last years, his close friend, the Hungarian-born Marshal of France Ladislas Ignace de Bercheny lived on his estate to provide company.

Leszczyński died aged 88 in 1766 as a result of serious burns – his silk attire had caught fire from a spark while the King was asleep near the fireplace in his palace in Lunéville on 5 February. He was medically treated for several days but died of wounds on 23 February. He was the longest living Polish king.

Originally buried in the Church of Notre-Dame-de-Bonsecours, Nancy, following the French Revolution his remains were brought back to Poland and buried in the royal tomb of the Wawel Cathedral in Kraków.

== Children ==
1. Anna (25 May 1699 – 20 June 1717) died unmarried and childless.
2. Marie (23 June 1703 – 24 June 1768) married Louis XV of France and had issue.

== Ancestry ==
Ancestors of Stanisław Leszczyński

8. Rafał Leszczyński (1579–1636)
4. Bogusław Leszczyński
9. Anna Radzimińska
2. Rafał Leszczyński (1650–1703)
10. Kaspar von Dönhoff
5. Anna von Dönhoff
11. Anna Aleksandra Koniecpolska
1. Stanisław Leszczyński
12. Jan Jabłonowski
6. Stanisław Jan Jabłonowski
13. Anna Ostroróga
3. Anna Leszczyńska (1660–1727)
14. Aleksander Dominik Kazanowski
7. Marianna Kazanowska
15. Anna Potocka

== Play and opera ==
Loosely based on an incident of King Stanisław's life are the play Le faux Stanislas written by the Frenchman Alexandre Vincent Pineu-Duval in 1808, transformed into the opera Un giorno di regno, ossia Il finto Stanislao (A One-Day Reign, or The Pretend Stanislaus, but often translated into English as King for a Day) by Giuseppe Verdi, to an Italian libretto written in 1818 by Felice Romani.

== Gallery ==
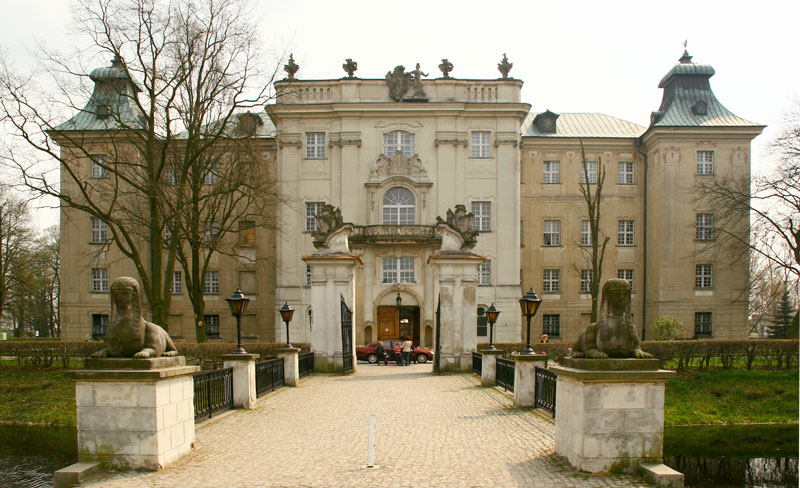
Castle in Rydzyna was rebuilt in 1700 by Pompeo Ferrari at his order.

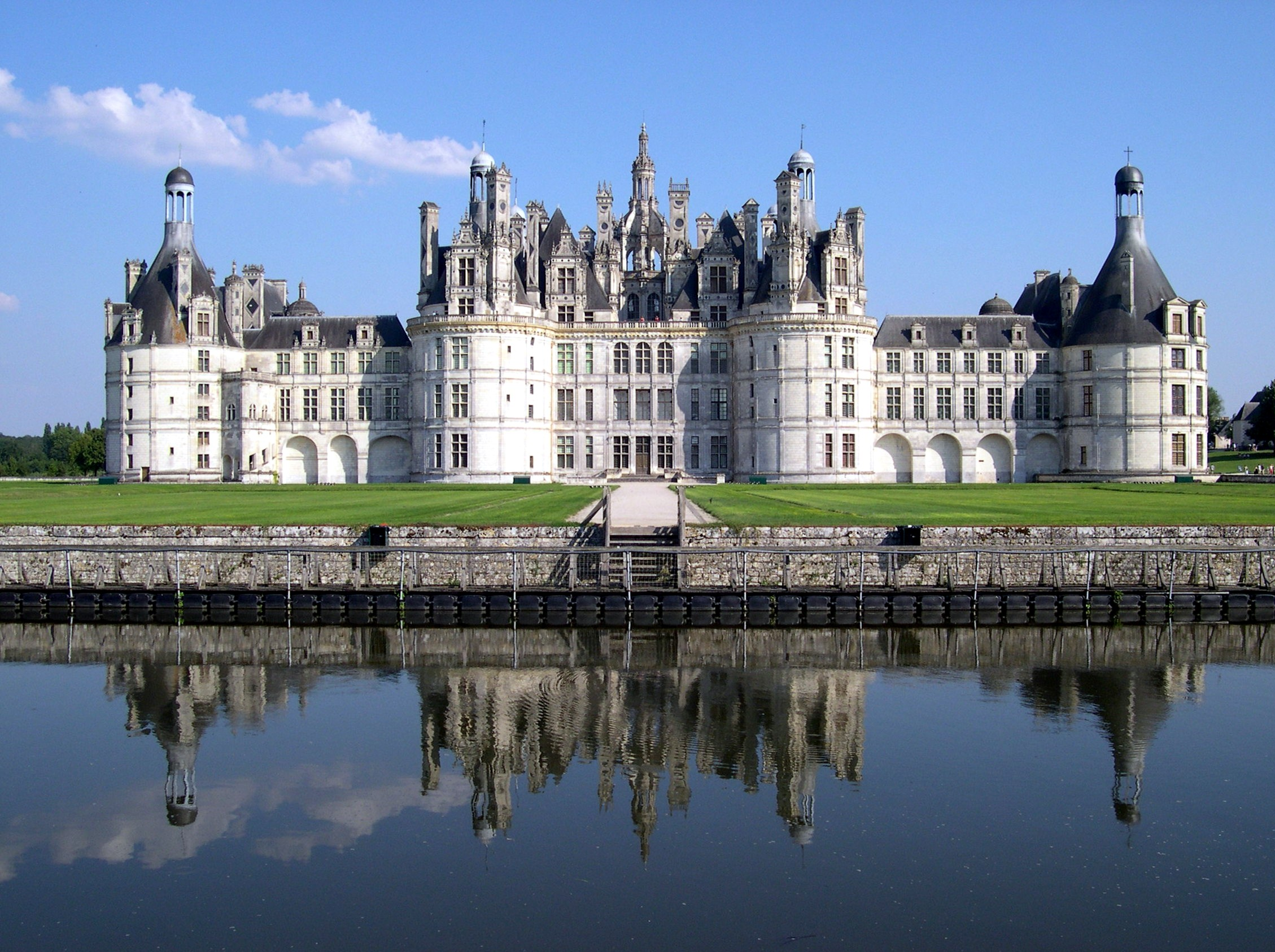
Château de Chambord, where he lived between 1725 and 1733.

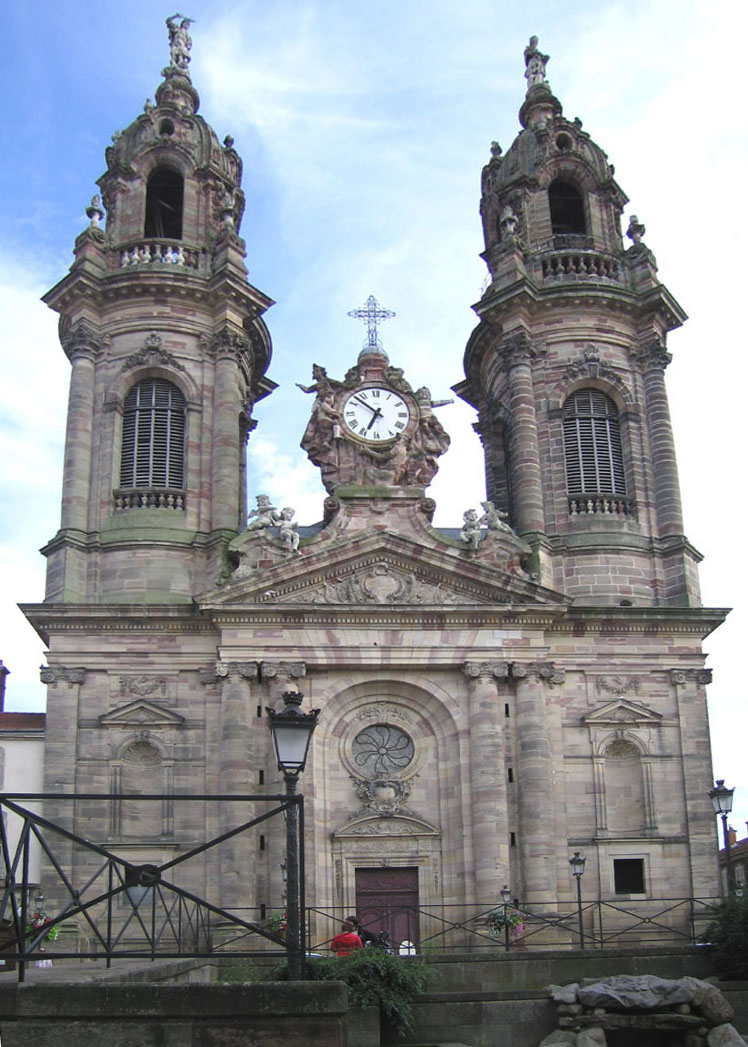
Église Saint-Jacques in Lunéville was established by him in 1745.

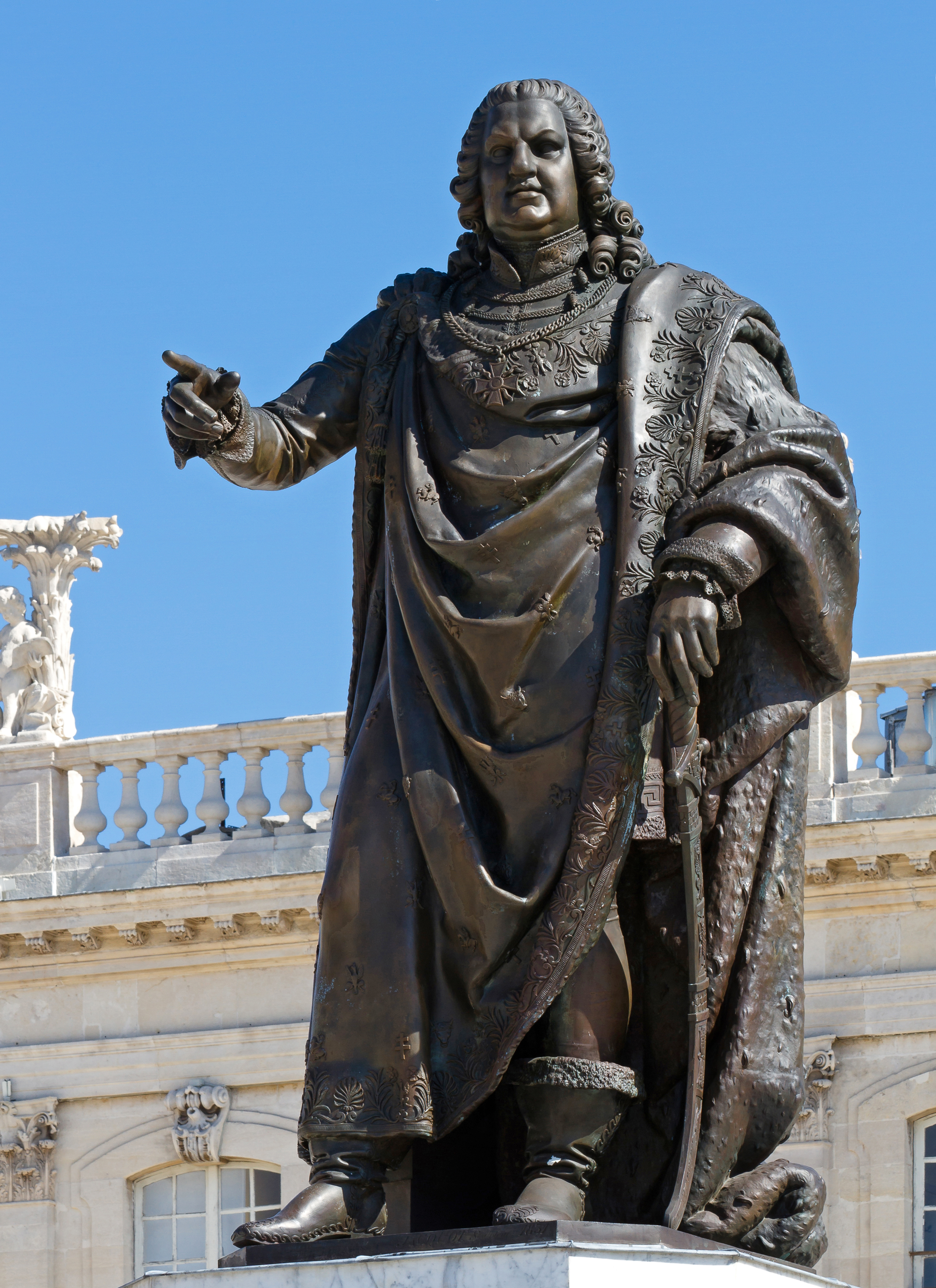
Statue at Place Stanislas in Nancy, unveiled in 1831.

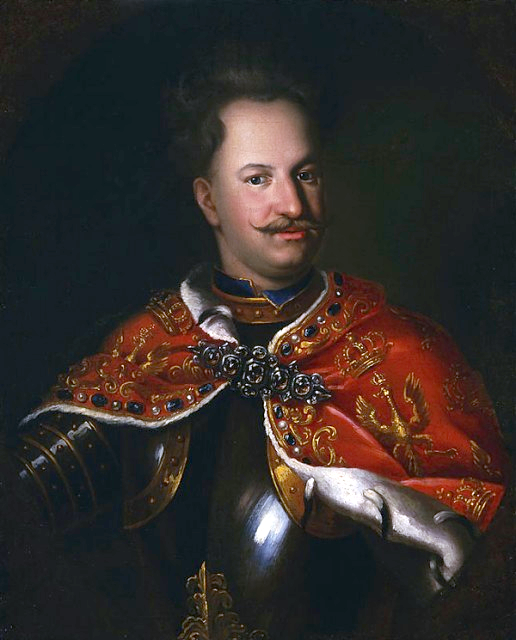
Portrait of Stanisław Leszczyński by Ádám Mányoki, circa 1700's

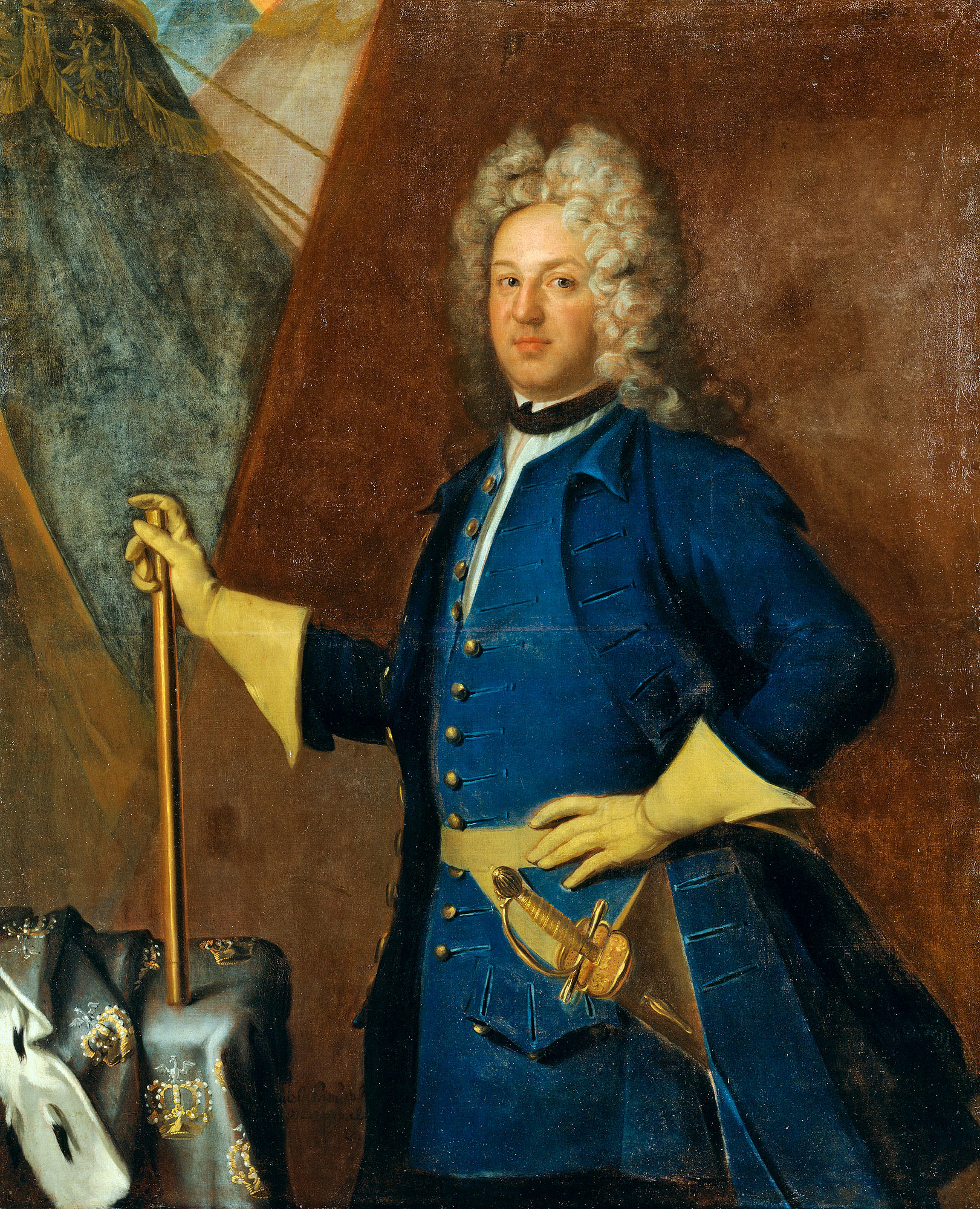
1706 portrait by David von Krafft

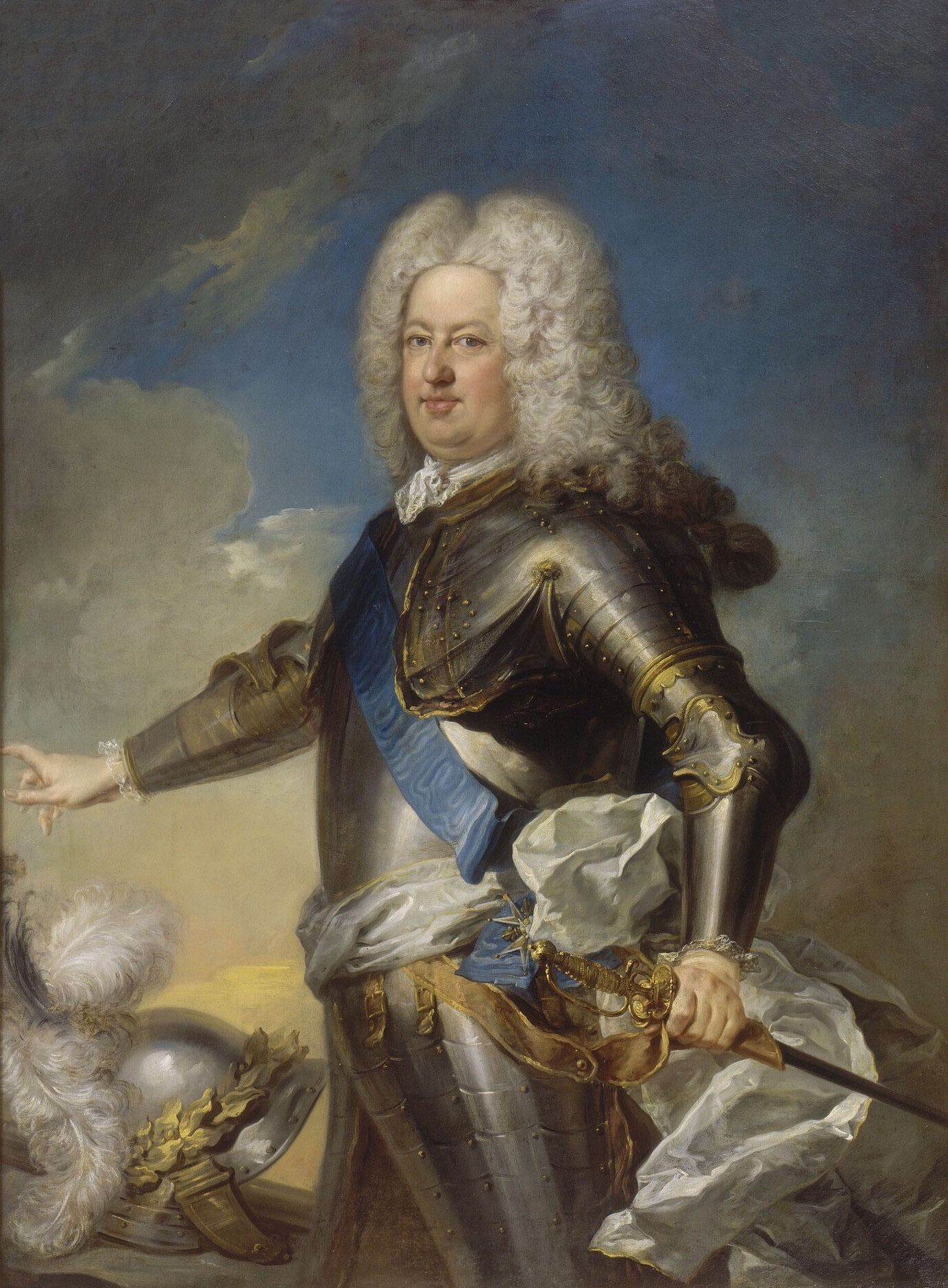
Portrait by Jean-Baptiste van Loo, 1727–1728

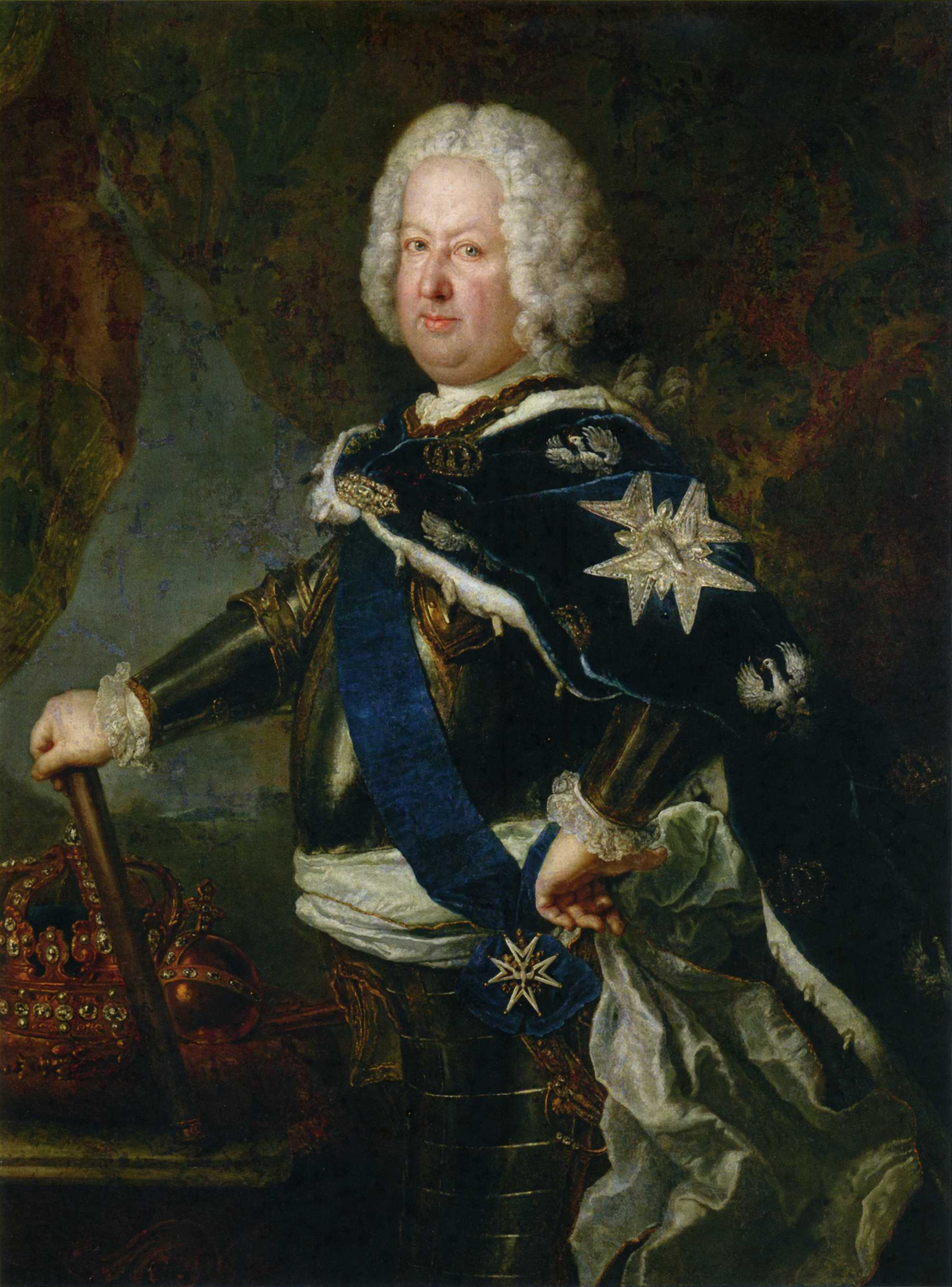
King Stanisław Leszczyński by Antoine Pesne, 1731

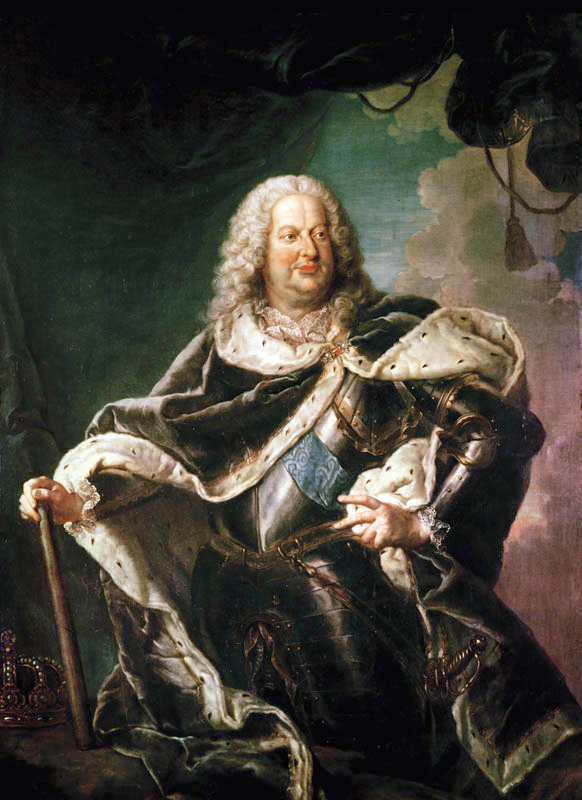
Portrait from c. 1750

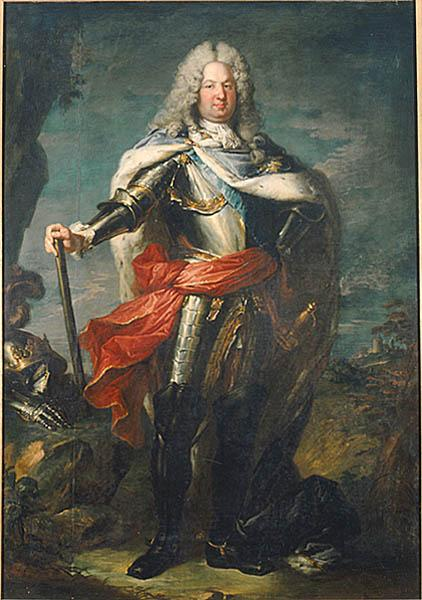
Portrait by Hyacinthe Rigaud

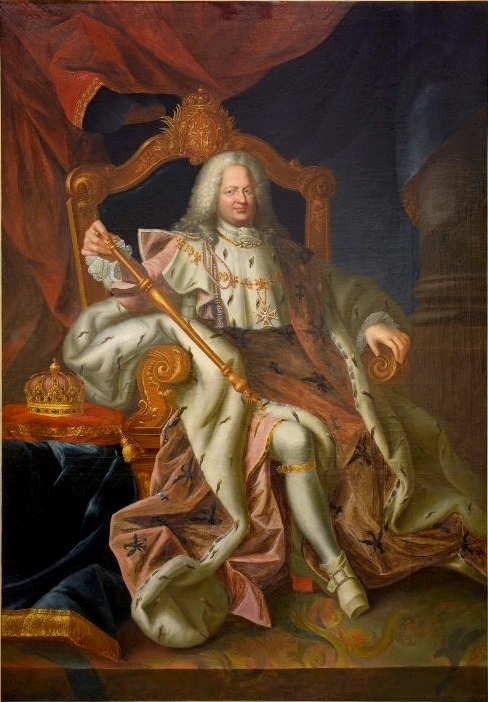
Portrait by Jean Girardet

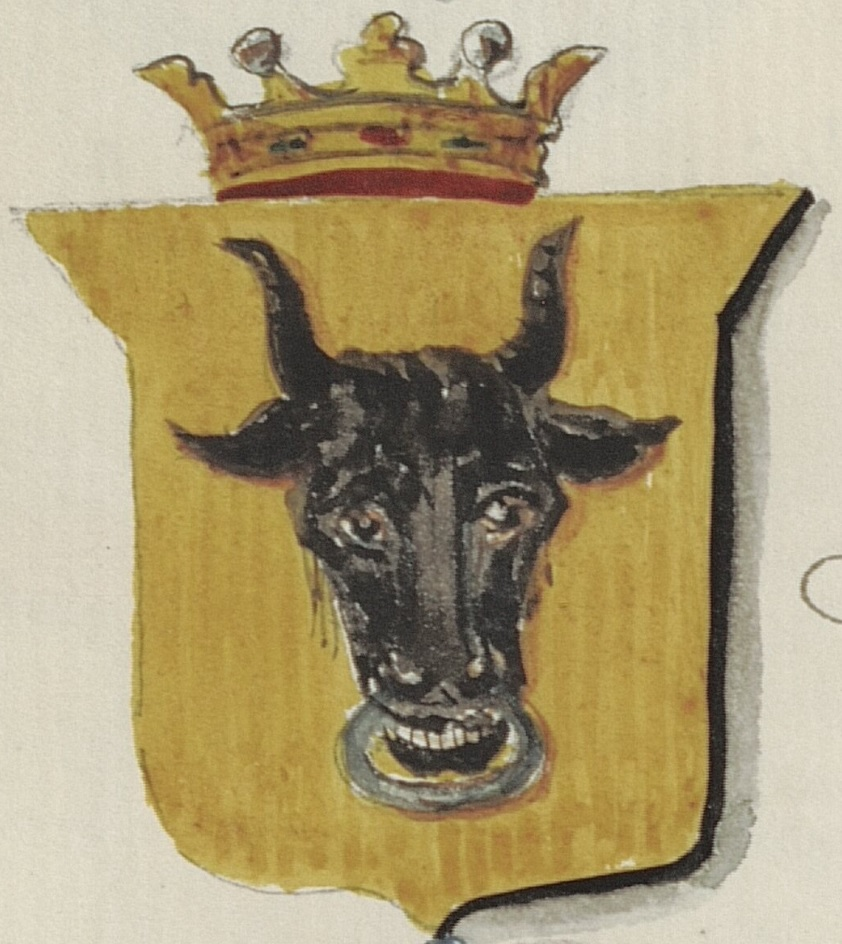
Personal coat of arms

== See also ==
- History of Poland (1569–1795)
- History of philosophy in Poland
- List of Poles

== Notes ==
Stanisław Leszczyński House of Leszczyński Born: 20 October 1677 Died: 23 February 1766
Regnal titles
Preceded by Augustus II the Strong	King of Poland; Grand Duke of Lithuania; 1704 – 1709	Succeeded by Augustus II the Strong
Preceded by Augustus II the Strong	King of Poland; Grand Duke of Lithuania; 1733 – 1736	Succeeded by Augustus III of Poland
Preceded by Francis III Stephen	Duke of Lorraine; 1737 – 1766	Annexation by France
