= Andrzej Leszczyński =

Andrzej Leszczyński may refer to:

- Andrzej Leszczyński (1553–1606), starost of Nakło, voivode of Brześć Kujawski
- Andrzej Leszczyński (1606–1651), Voivode of Dorpat Voivodship
- Andrzej Leszczyński (1608–1658), chancellor and primate
