= 1733 Polish–Lithuanian royal election =

Royal election in the Polish–Lithuanian Commonwealth

1733 Polish-Lithuanian Free election
- September 12, 1733
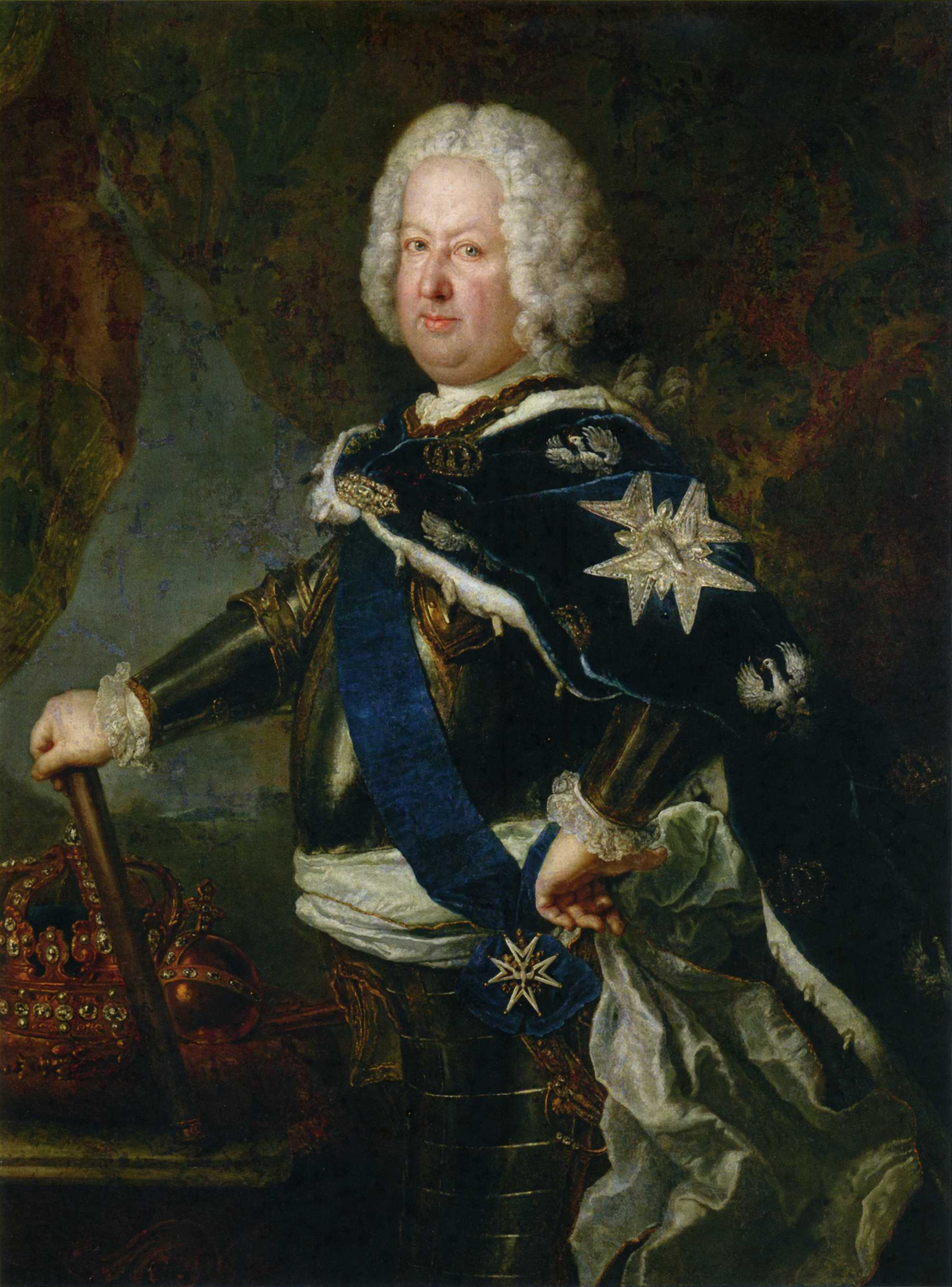

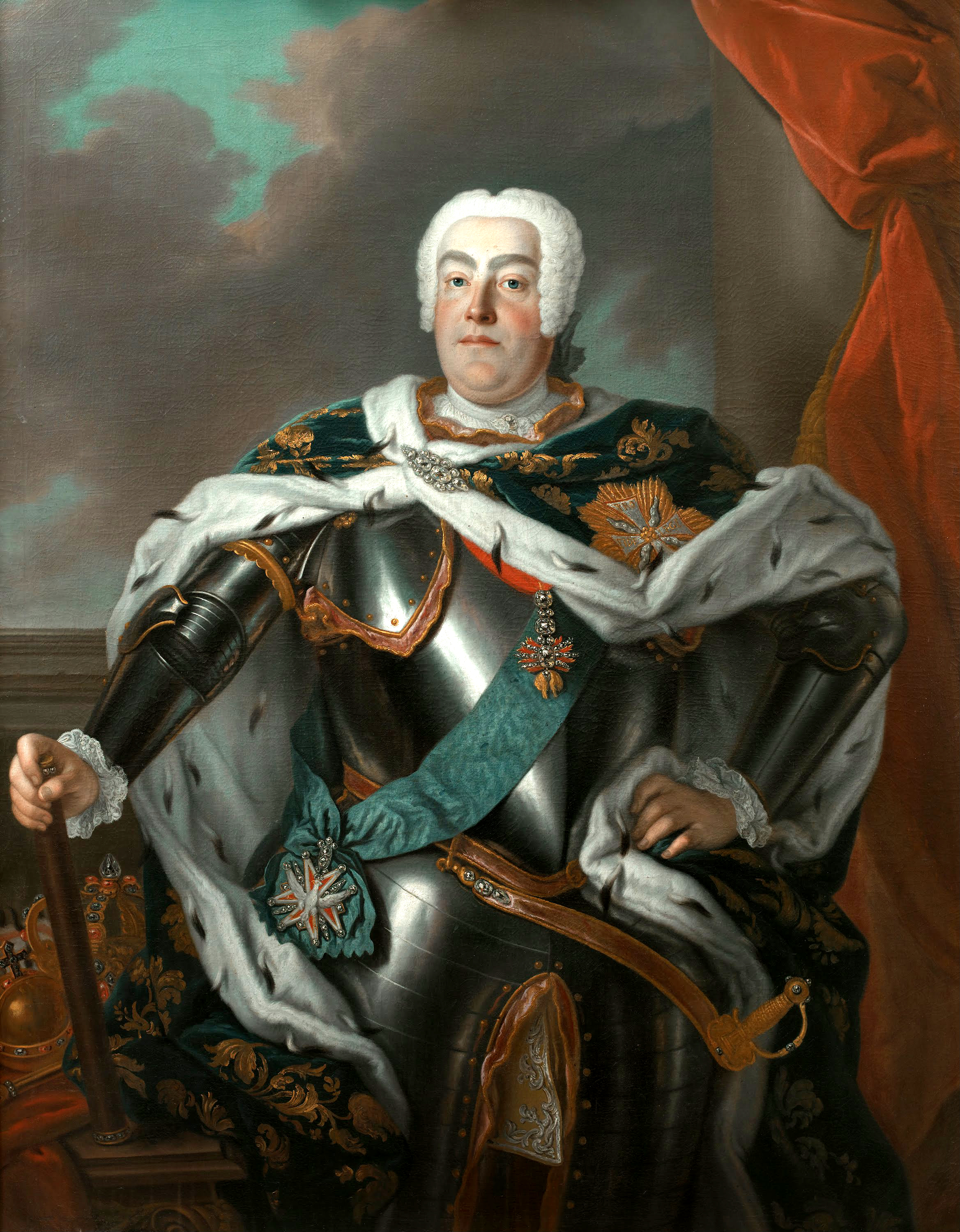

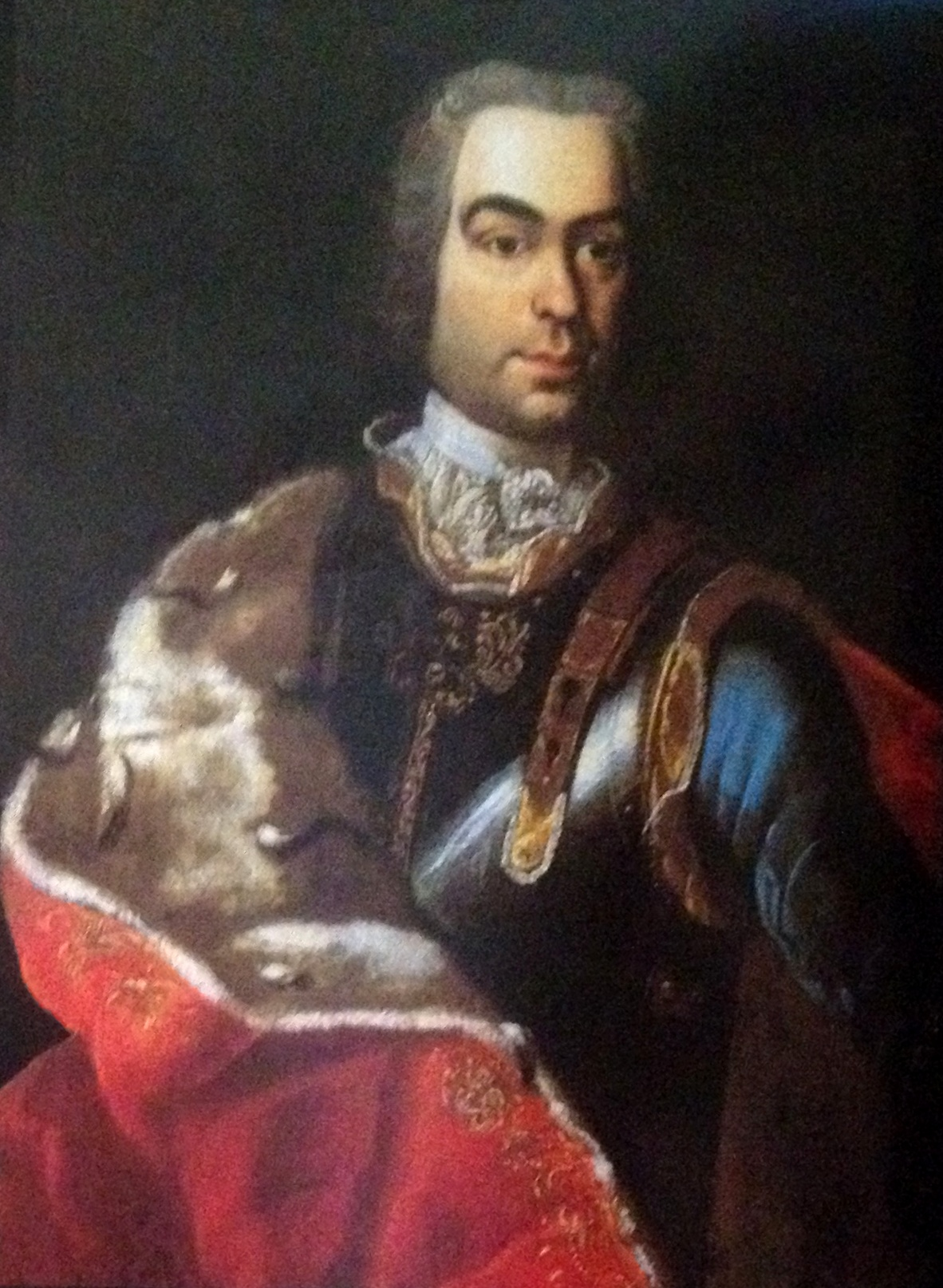
Candidate	Stanisław Leszczyński	Friedrich August II, Elector of Saxony	Infante Manuel, Count of Ourém
Faction	Piast	Pro-Russian
Electoral vote	13,500	1,000
King before election
Augustus II the Strong
Elected King
Stanisław I

The 1733 Polish–Lithuanian royal election was an election to decide on the new candidate for the Polish–Lithuanian throne.

== History ==
On February 1, 1733, the King of Poland and Grand Duke of Lithuania Augustus II the Strong died in Warsaw, leaving the Polish–Lithuanian Commonwealth without a monarch. Another royal election was necessary. This time, the Polish – Lithuanian nobility firmly opposed a foreign candidate, such as Portuguese Infante Manuel, Count of Ourem, who was supported by the Russian Empire and the Habsburg Empire (see Treaty of the Three Black Eagles).

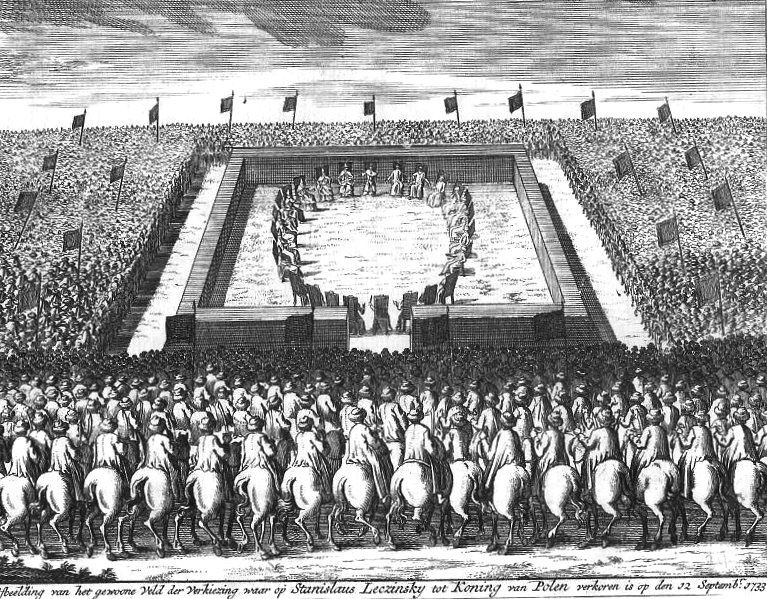
Election of Stanisław I Leszczyński in 1733

During the Convocation Sejm (June 1733), the Primate of Poland, interrex Teodor Potocki suggested that no foreign candidacy should even be considered in the election. This motion was accepted by two most powerful magnate families: the Potocki family and the Czartoryski family. Furthermore, the conservative Roman Catholic nobility banned Protestants from all public offices. In the light of these events, former King Stanisław I Leszczyński emerged as the most obvious candidate. Leszczyński himself was not well-remembered in the Commonwealth, as during his reign (1704–1709) he was a puppet of the Swedish Empire, and left the Commonwealth after the Battle of Poltava. In 1725, his daughter Marie married King Louis XV of France, and became Queen consort of France and Navarre. As a result of this marriage, Leszczyński’s popularity among the Polish nobility was widespread, as there were hopes that his election would elevate the international position of Poland, and end internal arguments within the Commonwealth. At the same time, courts in Vienna, St. Petersburg and Berlin opposed the pro-French Leszczyński, fearing that it would strengthen the Kingdom of France.

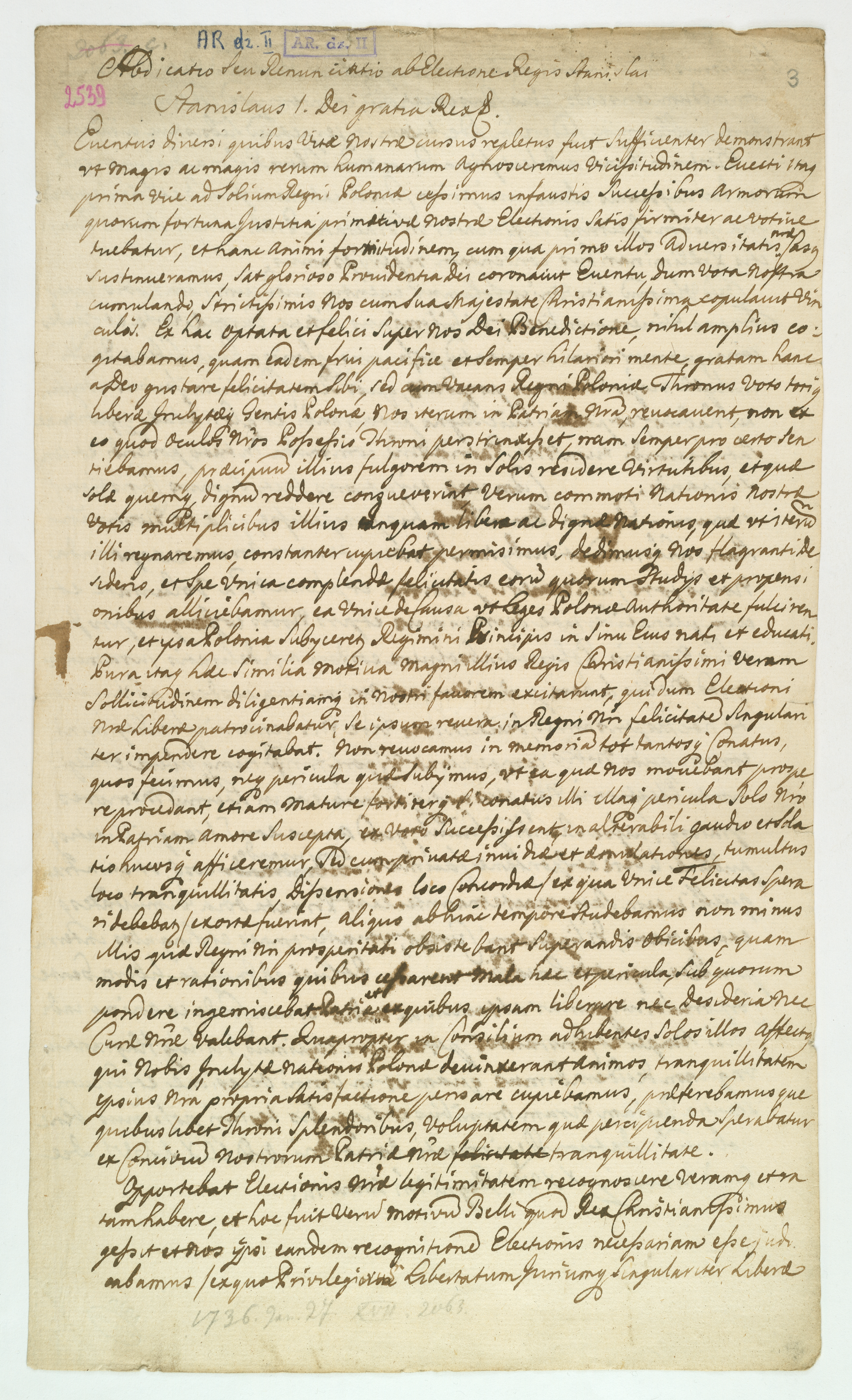
The Act of Abdication of Stanisław I Leszczyński.

In July 1733, Leszczyński appeared in Versailles, and soon afterwards, France assembled a naval force, which was to transport the Pole from Brest to Gdańsk. These preparations, however, were a ruse of Cardinal Andre-Hercule de Fleury, who did not want to risk a conflict with England. Therefore, Leszczyński, disguised as a merchant named Ernest Bromback, accompanied by French Army officer Dandelot, reached Poland by land, after a trip through Germany.

On September 12, 1733, the nobility, gathered in Wola near Warsaw, elected Leszczyński new king of Poland. In the popular vote, he received the support of 13,500 electors. This news was received in Paris with joy, but soon after the election, the new king had to flee to Gdańsk, where he awaited French military assistance. Leszczyński feared a 30,000 strong Russian army, which entered the Commonwealth in early August. The Russians organized a separate royal election (October 5), with only 1,000 electors, who voted for Augustus III, the son of Augustus II the Strong. These events marked the beginning of a major European conflict, known as War of the Polish Succession.

A civil war also broke out in the Commonwealth. Russian army captured Kraków, where Augustus III was crowned on January 17, 1734. Eventually, Russian and Saxon armies defeated the supporters of Leszczyński (see Siege of Danzig (1734)), and in 1736, the Pacification Sejm confirmed the accession of Augustus III to the Polish throne.

== See also ==
- History of Poland in the Early Modern era (1569–1795)
- Royal elections in Poland
- Golden Liberty
- Henrician Articles

== Sources ==
- U. Augustyniak, Historia Polski 1572–1795, Warszawa 2008
- M. Markiewicz, Historia Polski 1494–1795, Kraków 2002
