= Andrzej Leszczyński (1606–1651) =

Polish noble

Andrzej Leszczyński (1606–1651) was Voivode of Dorpat Voivodeship, Imperial Count and a supporter of Polish Calvinists. He was a son of Rafał Leszczyński (1579–1636).

== Biography ==
Educated abroad, skilled diplomat, poet, advocate of France, friend of French diplomat count Claude d'Avaux. After finishing his education in 1636, he returned to the Polish–Lithuanian Commonwealth, and after the death of his father he inherited Baranów Sandomierski and nearby lands in Sandomierz Voivodeship, Stary Czartorysk and Nowy Czartorysk in Wołyń Voivodeship, and starostwo dubieńskie.

A Calvinist himself, he was tolerant of any religious minorities, and was a major protector of Calvinist churches in Baranów Sandomierski, Romanów and Beresteczko. On 3 March 1641 he became the voivode of the Dorpat Voivodeship, but never became too involved in politics.

He was married three times: first with Anna Korecka, then (in 1643) with Katarzyna Niemirycz (a Polish Brethren), and finally with Krystyna Kalinowska, widow of Konstanty Wiśniowiecki.

He had only one son, Samuel Leszczyński, born in 1637, who inherited his father's fortune. Though baptised Calvinist, his Roman Catholic uncle Bogusław Leszczyński was his guardian, and brought up the boy as a Roman Catholic. He also closed down the Calvinist churches in Baranów Sandomierski and Beresteczko, which he saw as a threat to Leszno.
