= Rafał Leszczyński (1650–1703) =

Polish nobleman

- Coat of arms: Wieniawa
- Born: 1650
- Died: 31 January 1703 (aged 52–53); Oleśnica
- Noble family: Leszczyński
- Spouse: Anna Leszczyńska (m. 1676)
- Issue: Stanisław Leszczyński
- Father: Bogusław Leszczyński
- Mother: Anna Gräfin Dönhoff

Epitaph of Rafał Leszczyński in the St. Nicholas Basilica in Leszno

Rafał Leszczyński (1650–31 January 1703) was a Polish nobleman (szlachcic), politician and poet from the prominent Leszczyński family, owner of Leszno and Rydzyna, father of Polish King Stanisław Leszczyński.

He took part in the Battle of Vienna of 1683. In the 1697 Polish–Lithuanian royal election he supported Augustus II the Strong. In 1700, he was a Polish envoy to the Ottoman Empire.

As a poet, he wrote poems about Polish victories over the Turks at Vienna and Chocim and about King John III Sobieski.

== Biography ==
Rafał held the following noble positions:

- Podstoli of the Crown in 1676
- Stolnik of the Crown in 1677
- Krajczy of the Crown in 1678
- Great Chorąży of the Crown in 1683
- Voivode of Kalisz Voivodeship on 1685
- Voivode of Poznań Voivodeship in 1687
- Voivode of Łęczyca Voivodeship and General Starost of Greater Poland in 1692
- Grand Treasurer of the Crown in 1702
- Starost of Wschowa, Mościska, Odolanów, Dubno and Nowy Dwór
