= Pacification Sejm (1736) =

The Pacification Sejm was a session of the Sejm in 1736 that concluded the War of the Polish Succession in the Polish–Lithuanian Commonwealth that erupted after the death of Augustus II the Strong in February 1733. It confirmed the accession of Augustus III to the Polish throne, and gave Augustus the power to appoint as Duke of Courland a candidate who had the approval of Russia, Prussia, and the local nobility. (This power was in effect a retroactive approval of Augustus' agreement with Anna of Russia that she could name her preferred candidate, Ernst Johann von Biron, to that post.)
