= Bogusław Leszczyński =

Polish noble and politician

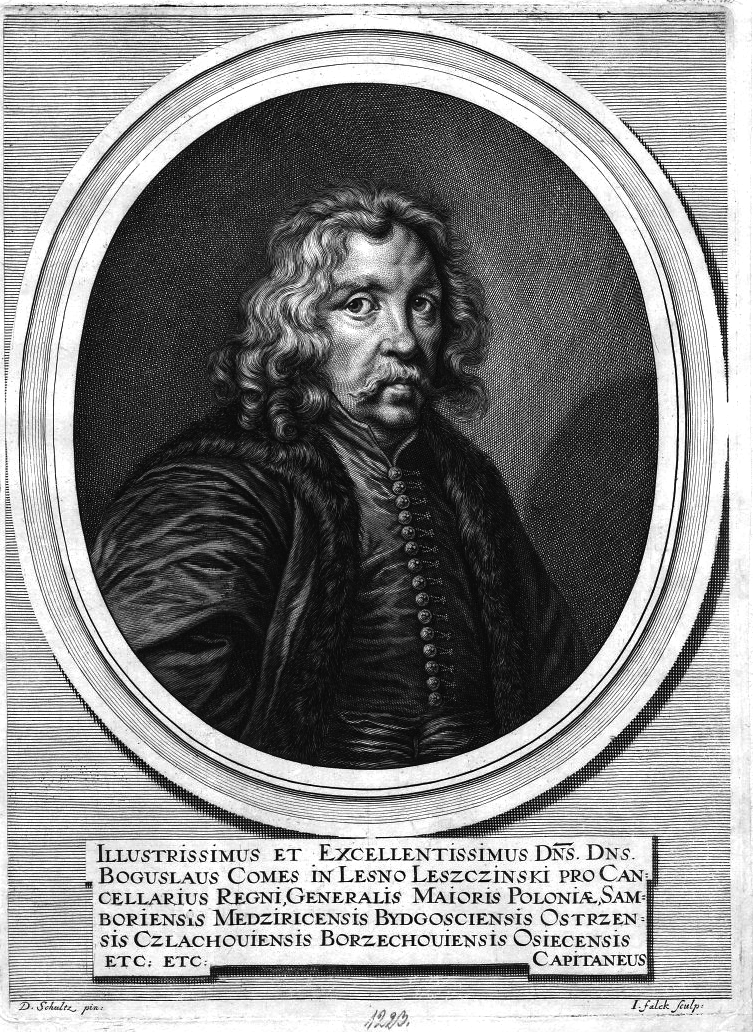
- Coat of arms: Wieniawa
- Born: 1614; Wiślica, Poland
- Died: 23 September 1659 (aged 44–45); Warsaw, Poland
- Noble family: Leszczyński
- Spouses: Anna Dönhoff; Joanna Katarzyna Radziwiłł
- Issue: Bogusław Leszczyński; Jan Przecław Leszczyński; Rafał Leszczyński; Aleksandra Cecylia Leszczyńska
- Father: Rafał Leszczyński
- Mother: Anna Radzimińska

Bogusław Leszczyński, count of Leszno (1614–1659) from the Leszczyński Family of Holy Roman Empire counts, was a Polish noble (szlachcic) and politician from Wielkopolska region.

== Biography ==
Traveled abroad from 1632 to 1636 with his tutor John Jonston, studied under Comenius.

Bogusław held the following official positions:

- General Starost of Greater Poland in 1642
- Grand Treasurer of the Crown 1650–1658
- Deputy Chancellor of the Crown in 1658–1660
- Starost of Bydgoszcz, Sambor, Międzyrzecz, Ostrów, Człuchów and Osiek.

He was the son of Rafał Leszczyński, count of Leszno, and Anna Radzimińska. After the death of his father in 1636 he inherited Leszno, Radzymin and part of Warsawian Praga. Bogusław married twice, first to Countess Anna Dönhoff, from a prominent Pomeranian family, in 1629 and later to the daughter of Court and Grand Marshal Prince Aleksander Ludwik Radziwiłł, princess Joanna Katarzyna Radziwiłł, in 1658.

Bogusław Leszczyński was a Czech brethren. Converted to Catholicism in 1642 but always supported Protestants. He was a frequent deputy and known orator of the Sejm, the lower house of the Polish parliament. He was a political rival of Krzysztof Opaliński. Also, he was often in opposition to plans of king Władysław IV Waza.

During the Swedish invasion of 1655 ("The Deluge"), he was committed by a chapter of the Sejm to defend the province of Greater Poland, but instead Bogusław began to negotiate with the Swedes and the Prussian elector.

Although considered a great speaker, he was also criticised by many for being selfish and dishonorable. He was suspected of defalcation of money and royal jewels. A telling story is that when he was offered a Chancellor's post, he bribed the members of the parliament to grant him "absolution", and when one of them later opposed him, he asked, curious: "Who's this son of a bitch that I failed to pay off?" After his death in 1659, deputies of the Sejm in 1662 were appointed to take matters up with his beneficiaries.

Bogusław held the following Sejm positions in Warsaw:

- Marshal of the ordinary Sejm on 20 July – 4 October 1641,
- Convocation sejm on 16 July – 1 August 1648
- Member of ordinary Sejm of 22 November 1649 – 13 January 1650

Bogusław's grandson Stanisław Leszczyński was King of the Polish–Lithuanian Commonwealth, and the father-in-law of Louis XV of France.
