= Rafał Leszczyński (1579–1636) =

Polish-Lithuanian noble

- Born: October 1579
- Died: 29 March 1636; Włodawa
- Noble family: House of Leszczyński
- Spouses: Anna Radzimińska; Catherine Pociej
- Father: Andrzej Leszczyński
- Mother: Anna Firlej

Rafał Leszczyński (October 1579 – 29 March 1636) was a Polish–Lithuanian noble and Imperial count. He was the castellan of Kalisz starting in 1618, he became the voivode of Bełz in 1620, and the starost of Hrubieszów in 1633. He was extensively educated in law, humanities, theology, military science, natural sciences, and even studied under Galileo. He also traveled over much of Europe.

== Biography ==
Rafał started his political career in the Sejmik of the Sandomierz Voivodeship. He was an opponent of king Sigismund III Vasa, but he never rose up in open rebellion like the participants in the Zebrzydowski Rebellion. He was Protestant, and was a defender of Protestant rights and religious tolerance in the Polish–Lithuanian Commonwealth, dedicating most of his political influence to matters of religion. He provided shelter for Czech Brethren and refugees from Silesia during the Thirty Years' War. He sponsored many new Protestant churches and schools, and developed existing ones, like the school in Leszno, under Czech pedagogue Jan Amos Komeński. He was called the "Pope of Calvinists in Poland." In foreign politics, he supported cooperation with both Catholic France and Protestant countries like Sweden.

He corresponded with Gabor Bethlen of Transylvania and George William, Elector of Brandenburg. George William of Brandenburg gave him a yearly donation of 3,000 zlotys, in exchange for his support for Protestant cause. After 1629 he also corresponded with Axel Oxenstierna, the Swedish chancellor. He was a strong supporter of the marriage between Władysław IV Waza and a Protestant (Calvinist) princess. He took part in the 1635 negotiations with Sweden, where he worked with the French ambassador, count Claude d'Avaux. He advised the king against hostilities with Sweden, and after the peace of 1635, he wanted to direct Polish foreign policy towards Silesia.

During his life he gathered substantial wealth: 17 towns and over 100 villages in Wielkopolska, Baranów and nearby lands in Sandomierz Voivodeship, Włodawa in Polesia, Woronczyn, Romanów and Beresteczko on Wołyń and Ruś. In 1612 founded the Wieniawa near Lublin.

He was the son of Andrzej Leszczyński, voivode of Brezesc-Kujawski. From 1604 to 1635 he was married to Anna Radzimińska (1586–1635), the daughter of Stanisław Radzimiński of Brodzic coat of arms.

Rafał's children:

- Rafał Leszczyński (1607–1644) a known supporter of Protestants;
- Andrzej Leszczyński, voivode of Dorpat
- Bogusław Leszczyński who inherited Leszno and who converted to Roman Catholicism
- Władysław Leszczyński supporter of Calvinists;
- Teodora Leszczyńska, patroness of Calvinists married to Zbigniew Gorajski), a leader of Polish Calvinists in Małopolska.
