= Dorpat Voivodeship =

Voivodship of Polish-Lithuanian Commonwealth

Coordinates: 58°22′33″N 26°43′37″E

Dorpat Voivodeship Województwo dorpackie
- Voivodeship of Livonia¹
- 1598–1621
- Coat of arms

- Dorpat Voivodeship in the Duchy of Livonia.
- Capital: Dorpat
- Area
- 9,000 km^{2} (3,500 sq mi)
- History
  - Established: 1598
  - Polish–Swedish War: 1621
Succeeded by
Swedish Livonia
- ¹ The Duchy of Livonia was a vassal to the Grand Duchy of Lithuania until the Union of Lublin in 1569, and after that a part of the Polish–Lithuanian Commonwealth.

The Dorpat Voivodeship (Polish: Województwo dorpackie or województwo derpskie) was a unit of administrative division and local government in the Duchy of Livonia, part of the Polish–Lithuanian Commonwealth, from 1598 until the Swedish conquest of Livonia in the 1620s. The seat of the voivode was in the town of Dorpat (Tartu), while the regional assembly (sejmik) for the whole province of Livonia was located in Wenden. The area of the Dorpat Voivodeship was app. 9,000 square kilometers, and it had two senators in the Senate of the Polish–Lithuanian Commonwealth.

The voivodeship was created by King Zygmunt III Waza in 1598, out of the Dorpat Presidency, which had existed since the Truce of Jam Zapolski (1582). It was divided into five districts:

- district (starostwo) of Dorpat (Tartu)
- district (starostwo) of Oberpahlen (Põltsamaa)
- district (starostwo) of Lais (Laiuse)
- district (starostwo) of Kirrumpah (Kirumpää)
- district (starostwo) of Neuhausen (Vastseliina)

It effectively ceased to exist in 1621, when northern Livonia was conquered by the Swedish Empire, and turned into Swedish Livonia (see also Polish–Swedish War (1600–1629)). Officially, the Dorpat Voivodeship was liquidated in 1660, following the Treaty of Oliva. Nevertheless, the title of Voivode of Dorpat was kept until the Partitions of Poland, as the so-called "fictitious title" (Polish: urzad fikcyjny).

== Castellans of Dorpat ==
- 1599–1609 Maciej Leniek
- 1612–1625 Bertrand Olszer

=== Titular castellans ===
- 1627–1631 Aleksander Massalski
- 1638–1643 Piotr Rudomina-Dusiacki
- 1644–1646 Henryk Denhoff

== Voivodes ==
The voivodes of Dorpat Voivodeship.

- 1598–1600 Jan Abramowicz,
- 1598 Gerard Denhoff (Gerhard Dönhoff; c. 1550–1598) (pl)
- 1600–1602 Marcin Kurcz (died 1602) (pl)
- 1609–1617 Teodor Dadźbog Karnkowski (1573–1617)
- 1617–1627 Mikołaj Kiszka (c. 1588–1644)

== Titular voivodes ==
- 26 August 1625 Tartu capitulated to Sweden
- 1627–1634 Kasper Doenhoff (Caspar Dönhoff; c. 1588–1645)
- 1634–1640 Gothard Jan Tyzenhauz (died 1640)
- 1641–1651 Andrzej Leszczyński (c. 1606–1651)
- 1651–1651 Enoch Kolenda
- 1651–1654 Teodor Denhoff (died 1654) (pl)
- 1654–1654 Zygmunt Opacki (died 1654)
- 1654–1658 Olbracht Opacki (c. 1621–1680)'
- ?–1657 Aleksander Ludwik Wolff
- 1657–1658 Zygmunt Wybranowski
- 1658–1660 Przecław Paweł Leszczyński (1605–1670)
- 1670–1676 Samuel Leszczyński (1637–1676)
