= Jan Tęczyński =

Jan Tęczyński may refer to:

- Jan Tęczyński (1581–1637), voivode of Kraków (1620–1637), Cup-Bearer of the Crown in 1618
- Jan Tęczyński (died 1405), member of the Tęczyński family, starost and castellan of Kraków
- Jan Tęczyński (died 1470), member of the Tęczyński family, castellan of Kraków, voivode of Kraków and Lublin
- Jan Tęczyński (1485–1553), Chamberlain and voivode of Sandomierz, Castellan and governor of Lublin, Speaker of the court of the Crown, Castellan of Wojnicki, and Count of the Holy Roman Empire
