= Jan Opaliński =

Jan Opaliński may refer to several members of the Opaliński family:

- Jan Opaliński (1519–1561) (or 1529?), father of Jan Opaliński (1546–1598)
- Jan Opaliński (died 1598) (1546–c. 1590), castellan of Rogozno, father of Jan Opaliński (1581–1637)
- Jan Opaliński (died 1637), voivode of Poznań
- Jan Karol Opaliński, (1642–1695), castellan of Poznań, starost
