= Opaliński family =

Polish noble family

Łodzia coat of arms, used by the Opaliński family

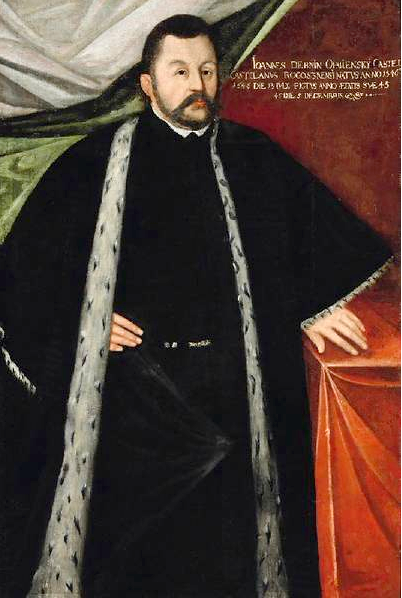
Jan Opaliński (1546-1598)

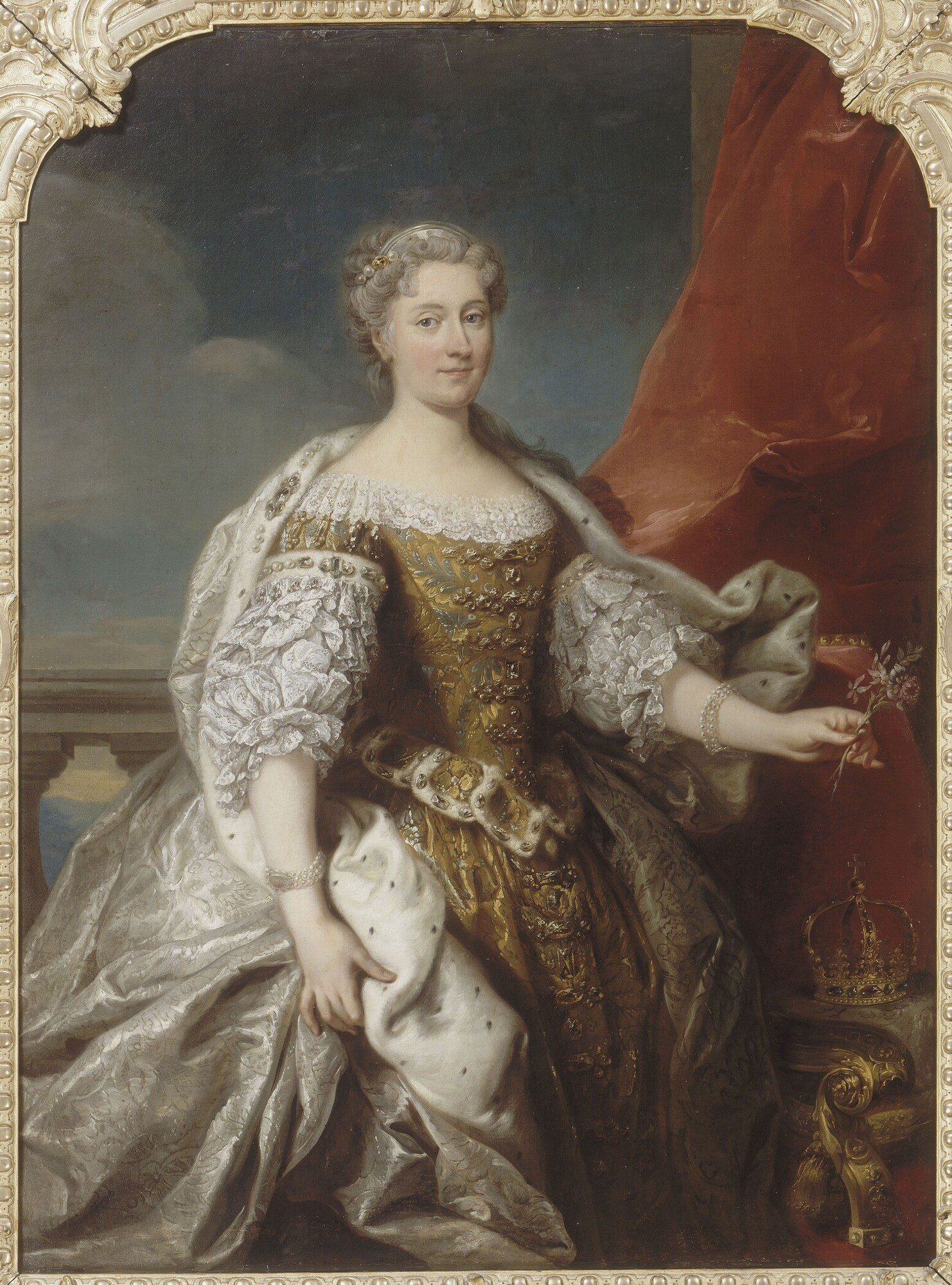
Katarzyna Opalińska, Queen consort of Poland

Lukasz Opalinski (1612-1662)

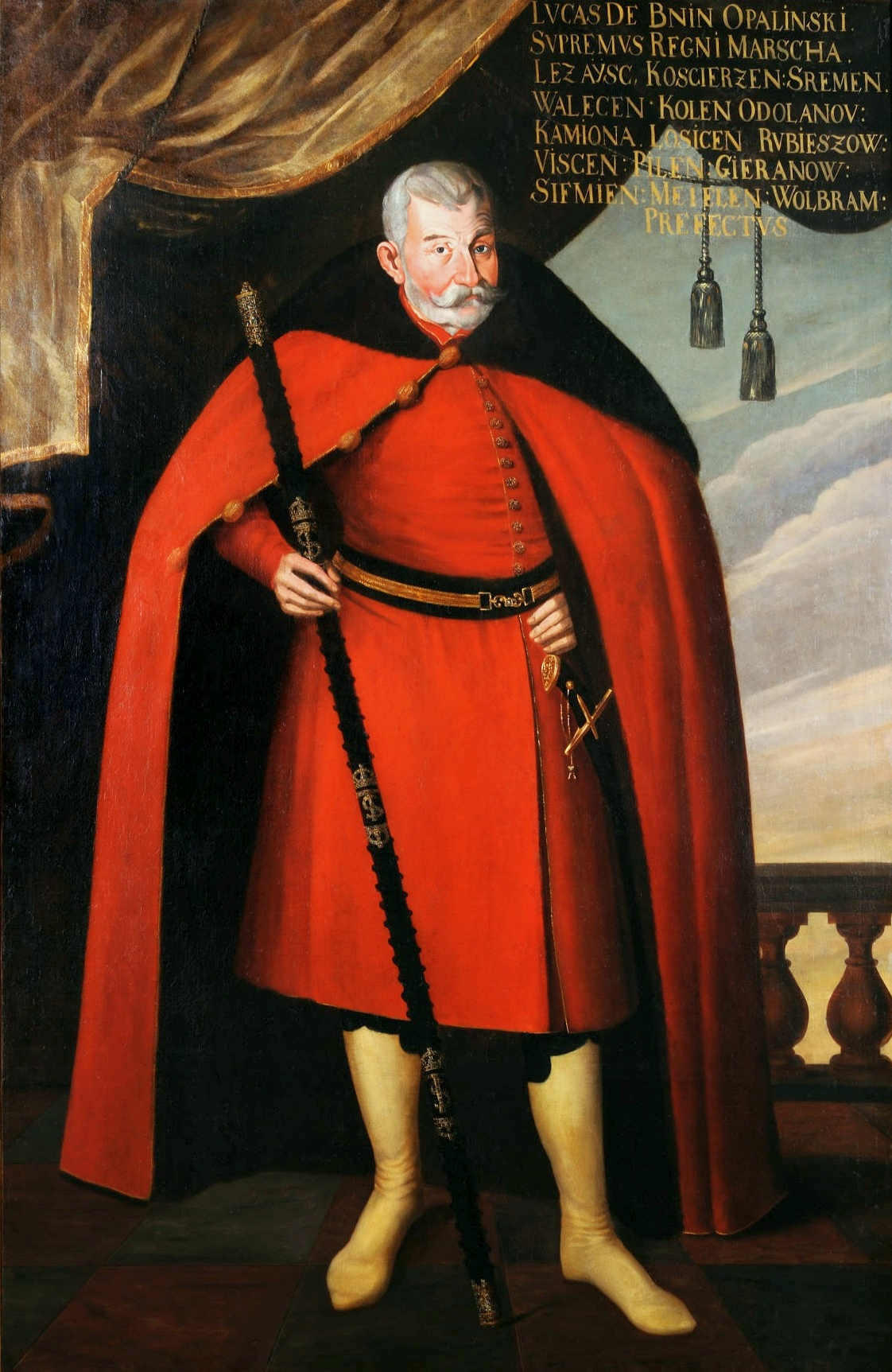
Lukasz Opalinski (1581–1654)

The House of Opaliński (plural Opalińscy) was an old and notable Polish noble family which produced one Queen Consort of Poland and Duchess Consort of Lorraine.

== History ==
They originated from the town of Opalenica and used the Coat of arms of Łodzia. They played a significant role in the politics of the Kingdom of Poland in the 16th and 17th centuries. One branch of the family hailed from Sieraków.

== Notable members ==
Its notable members included:

- Jan Opaliński (1546–1598), father of
  - Jan Opaliński (1581–1637)
  - Piotr Opaliński (1586–1624), father of
    - Krzysztof Opaliński (1611–1655), father of
      - Jan Karol Opaliński (1642–1695), father of
        - Katarzyna Opaliński (1680–1747), Queen consort of Poland
    - Łukasz Opaliński (1612–1666)
- Łukasz Opaliński (1581–1654)

== Palaces ==
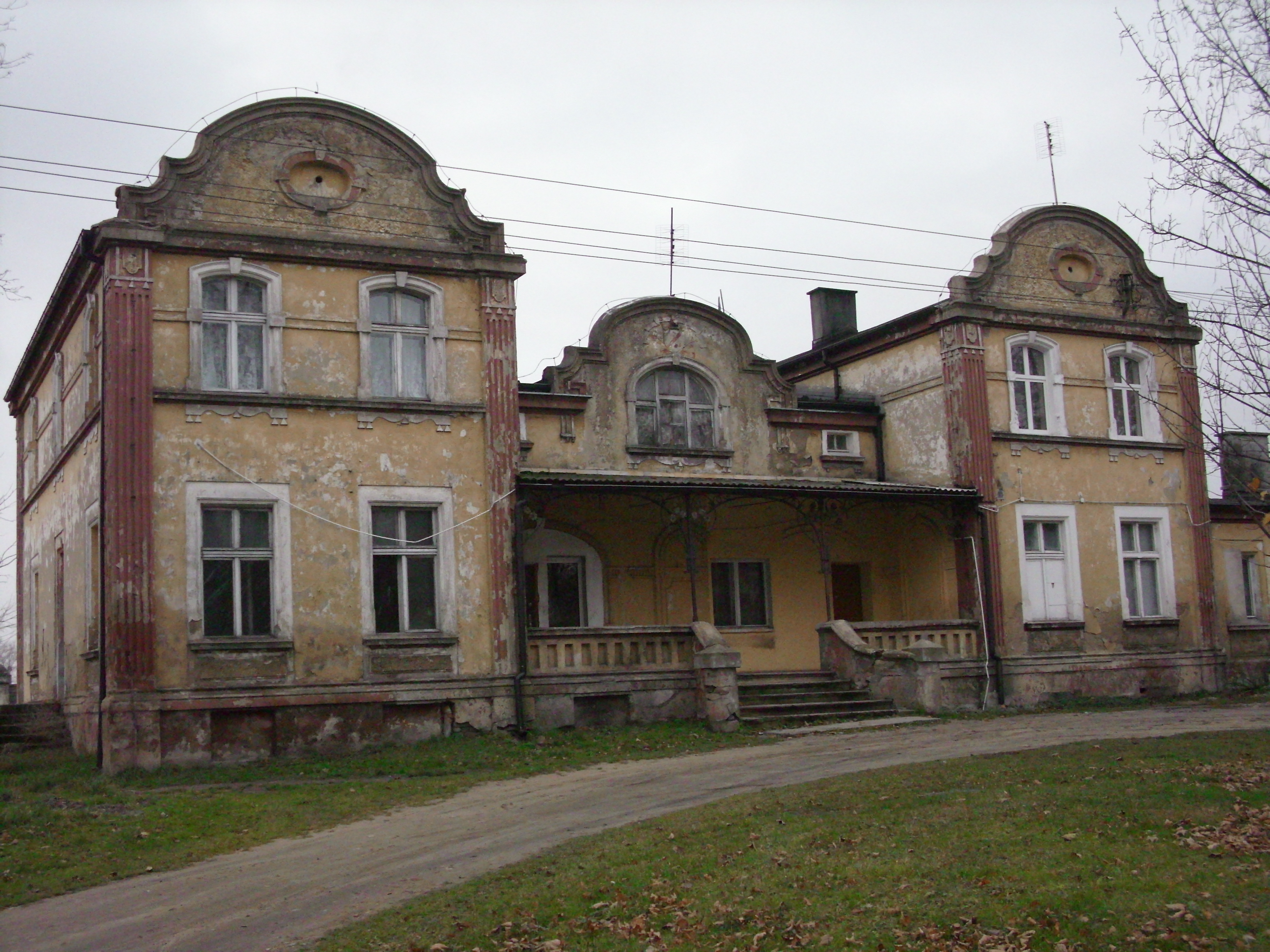
Ruined Opaliński Palace in Białężyce

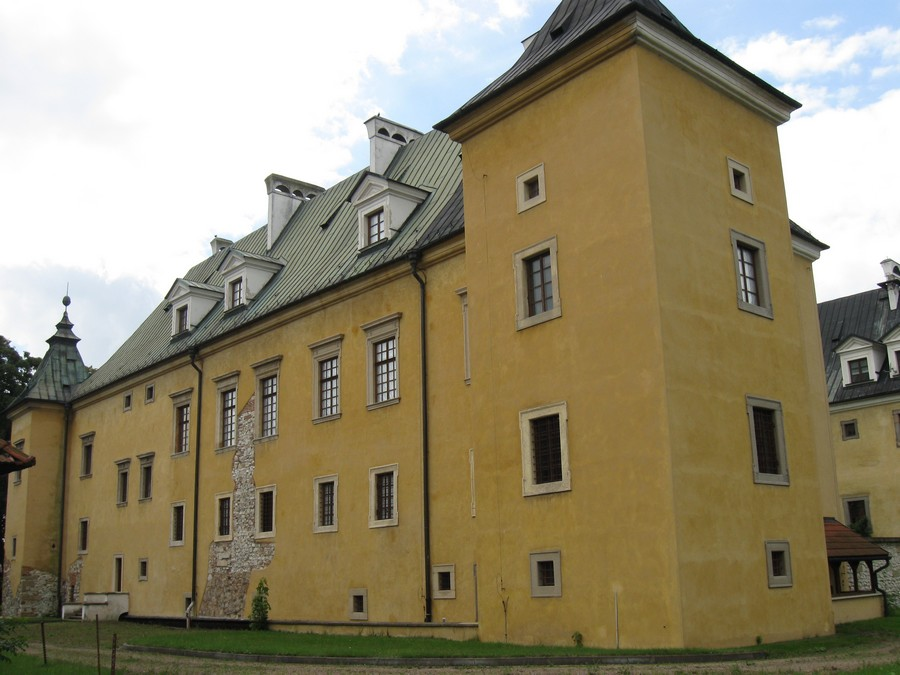
Castle in Spytkowice

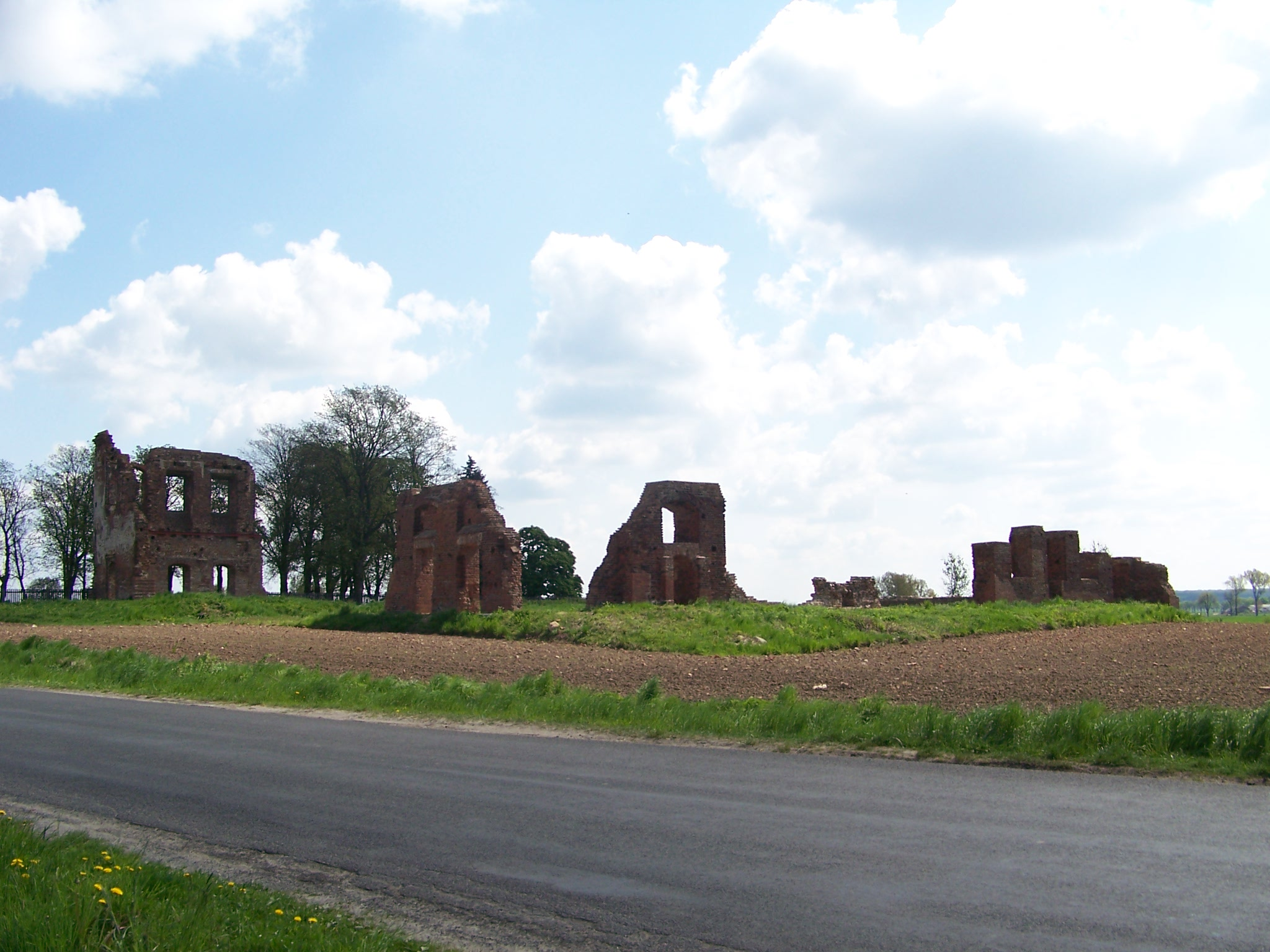
Ruins of the Castle of Radolin

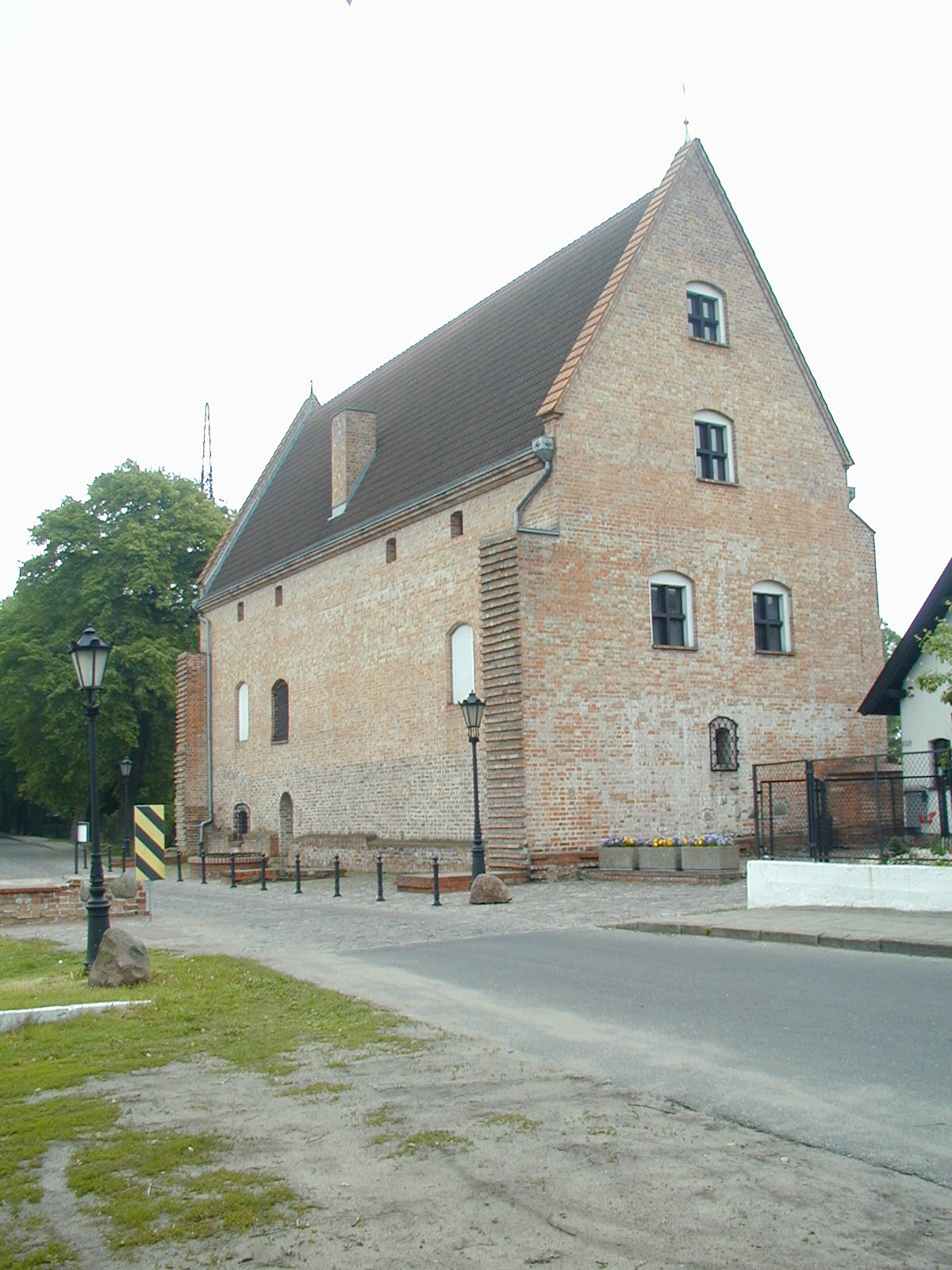
Museum of the Opaliński family in the Castle of Sieraków

== Gallery ==
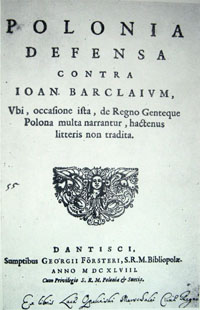
"Polonia defensa contra Barclaium in Europa" (1647), by Łukasz Opaliński (1612–1662)

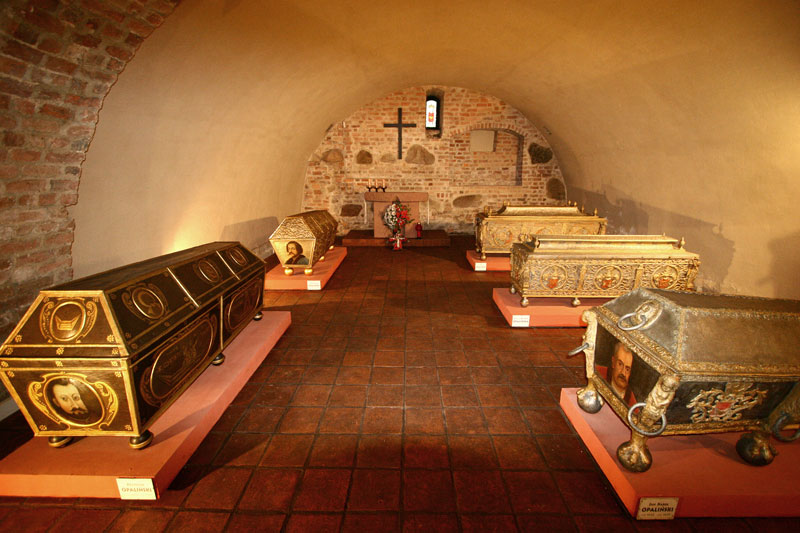
Sieraków, crypt of Opalińscy

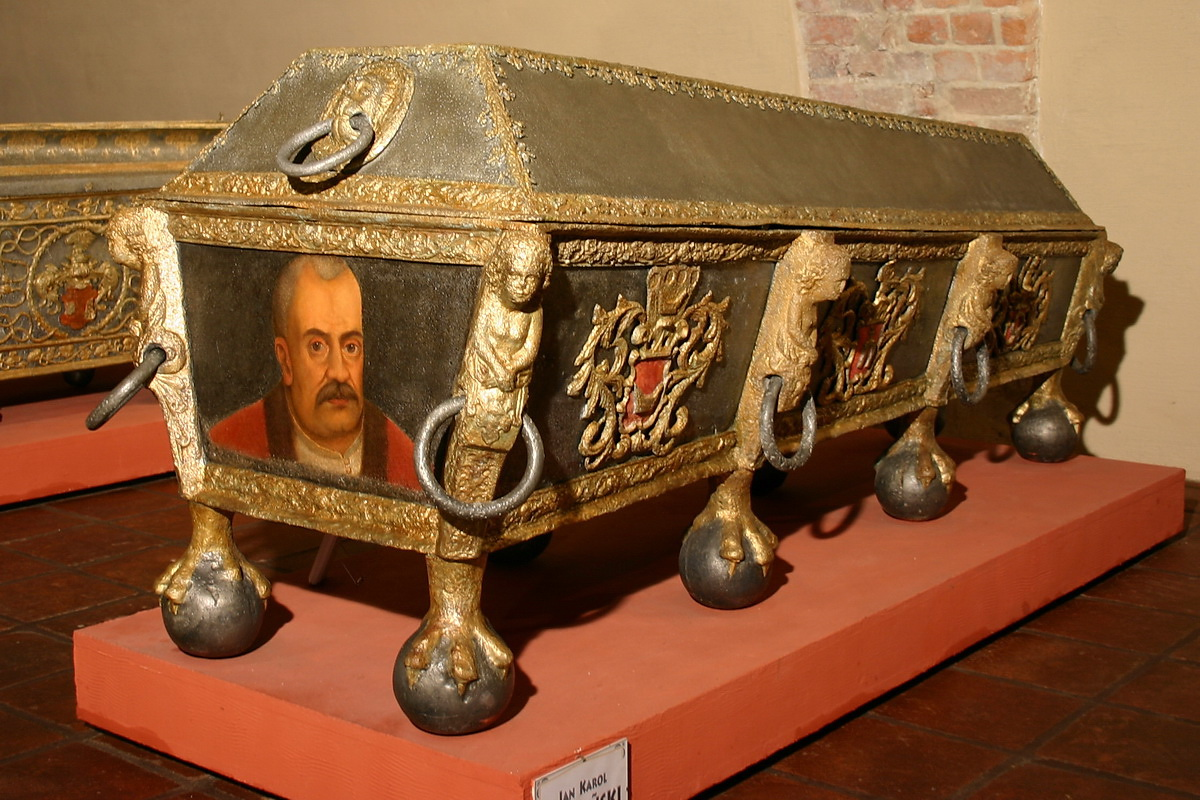
Jan Karol Opaliński's sarcophagus

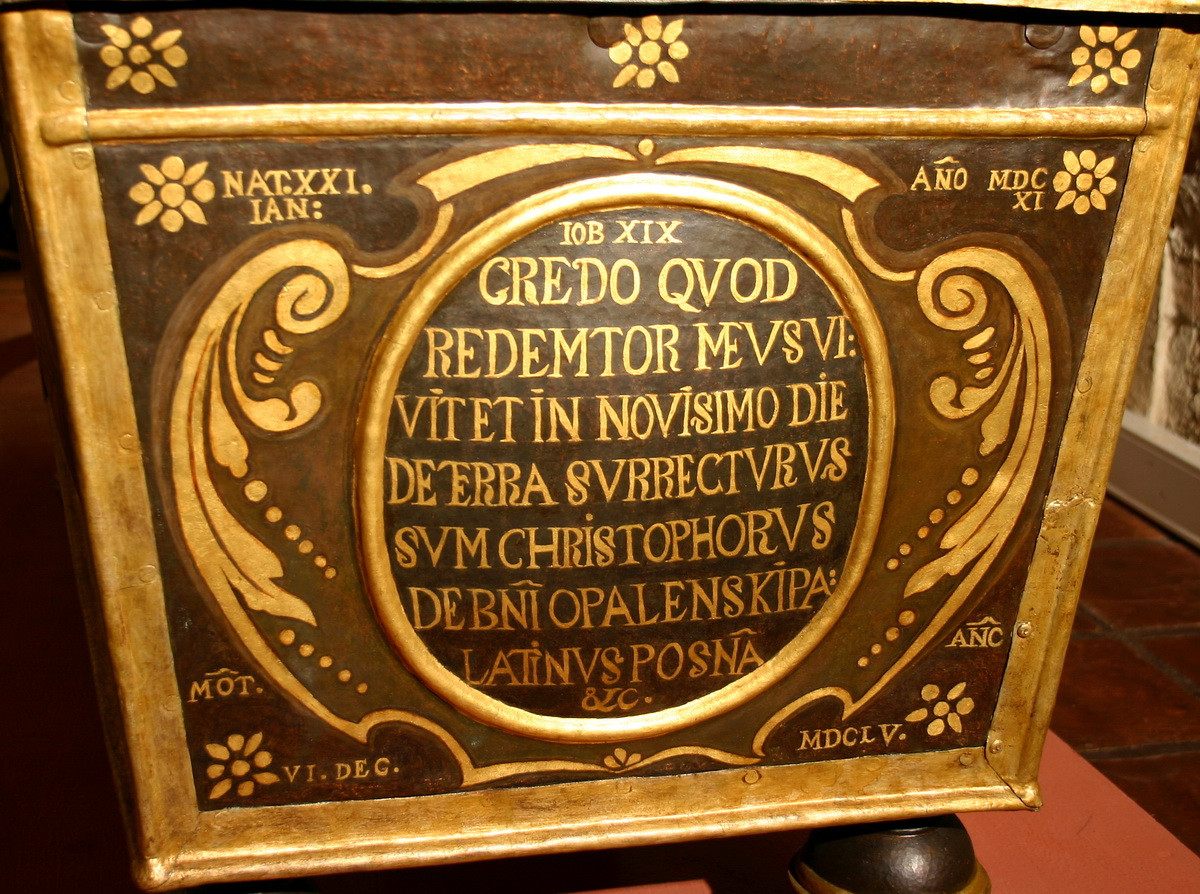
Krzysztof Opaliński's sarcophagus

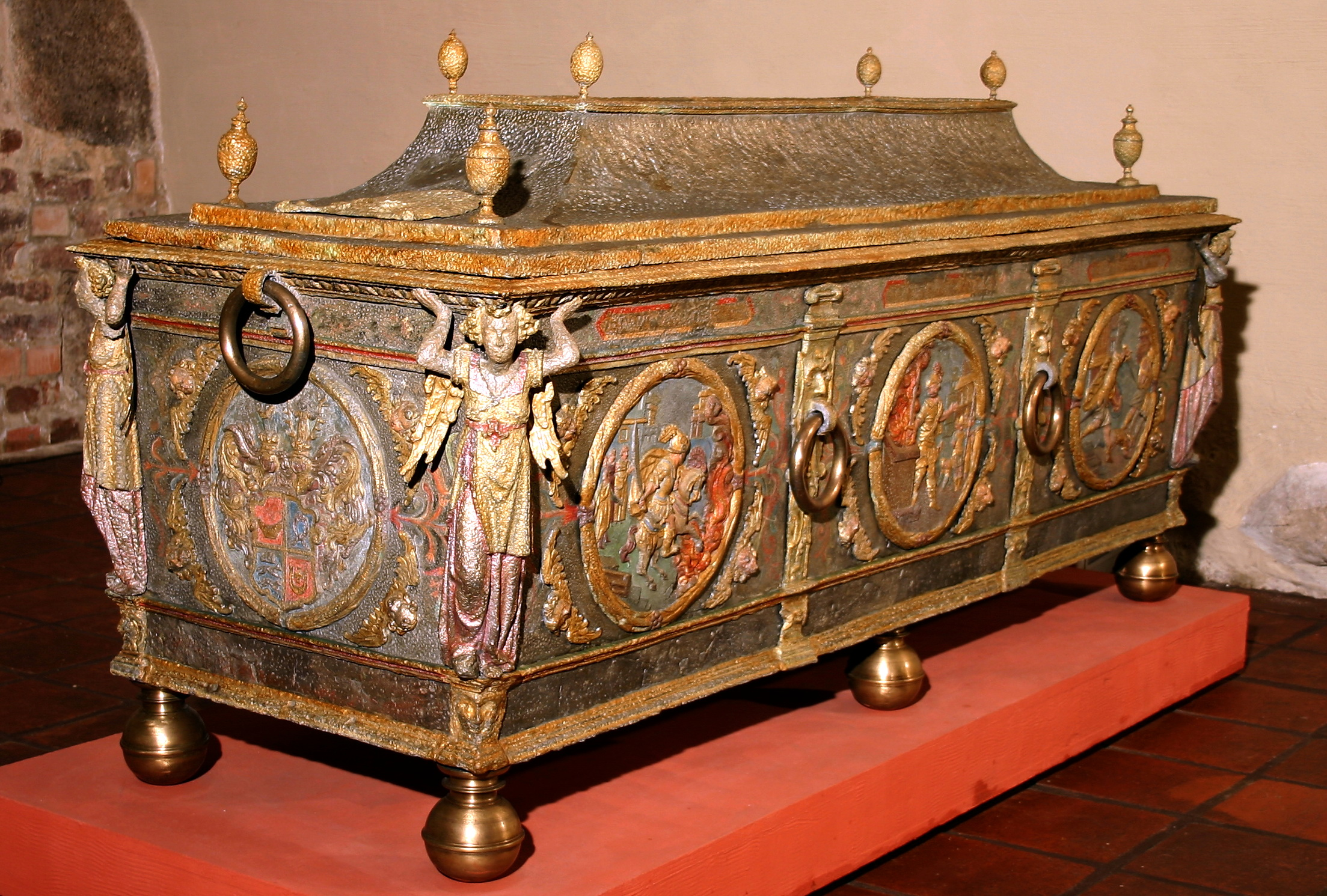
Piotr Opaliński's sarcophagus

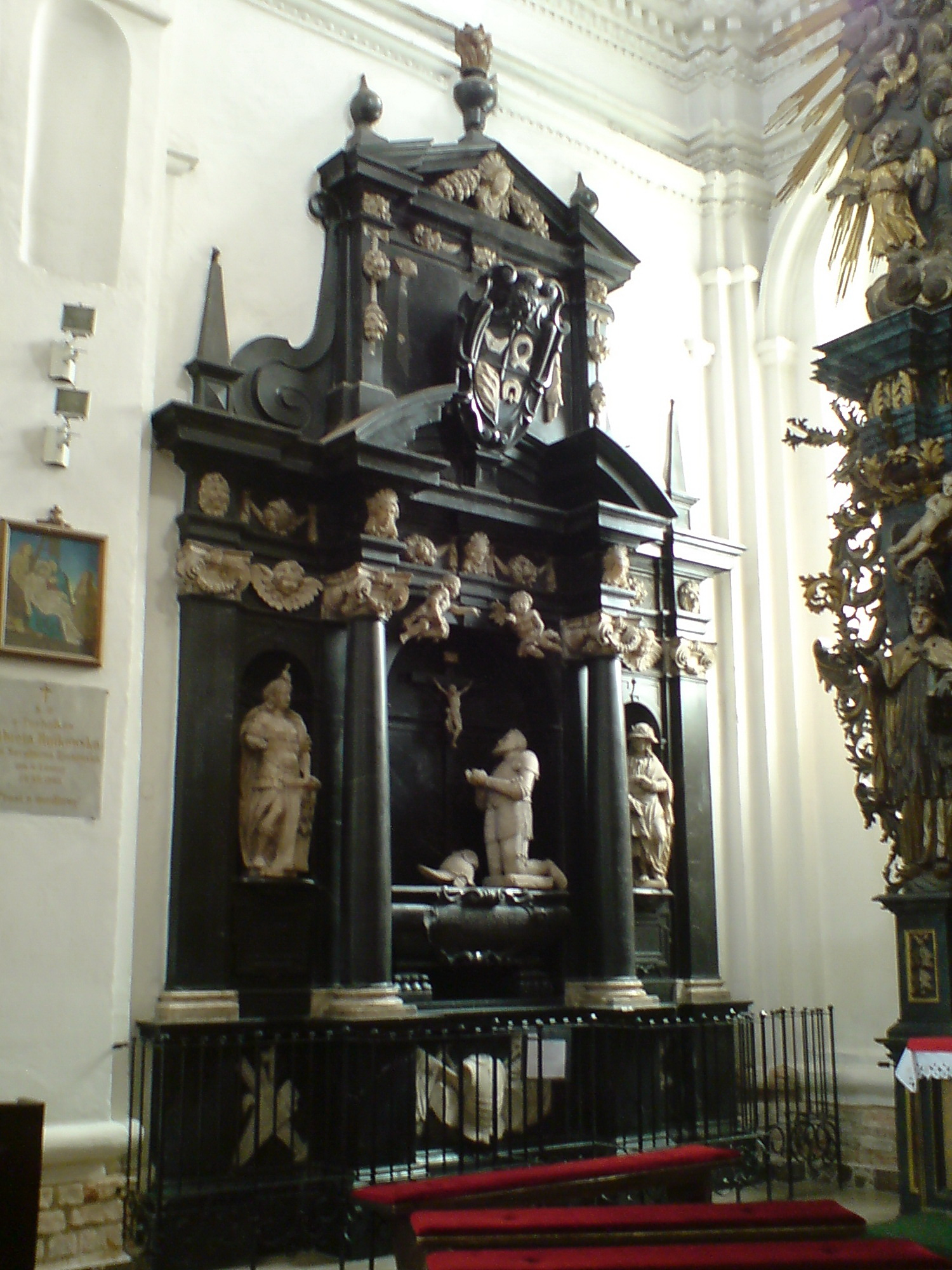
Headstone of Piotr Opaliński (1586–1624) in a church in Sieraków

== See also ==
- Opalenica
- Krzeszowice
- Rytwiany
- Tuliszków

== Bibliography ==
- Historia Polski. Bóg, Honor, Ojczyzna. Kompendium wiedzy dla całej rodziny. nr 132 ISBN 978-83-248-0591-4
