= Tenczyn Castle =

Coordinates: 50°06′08″N 19°34′55″E

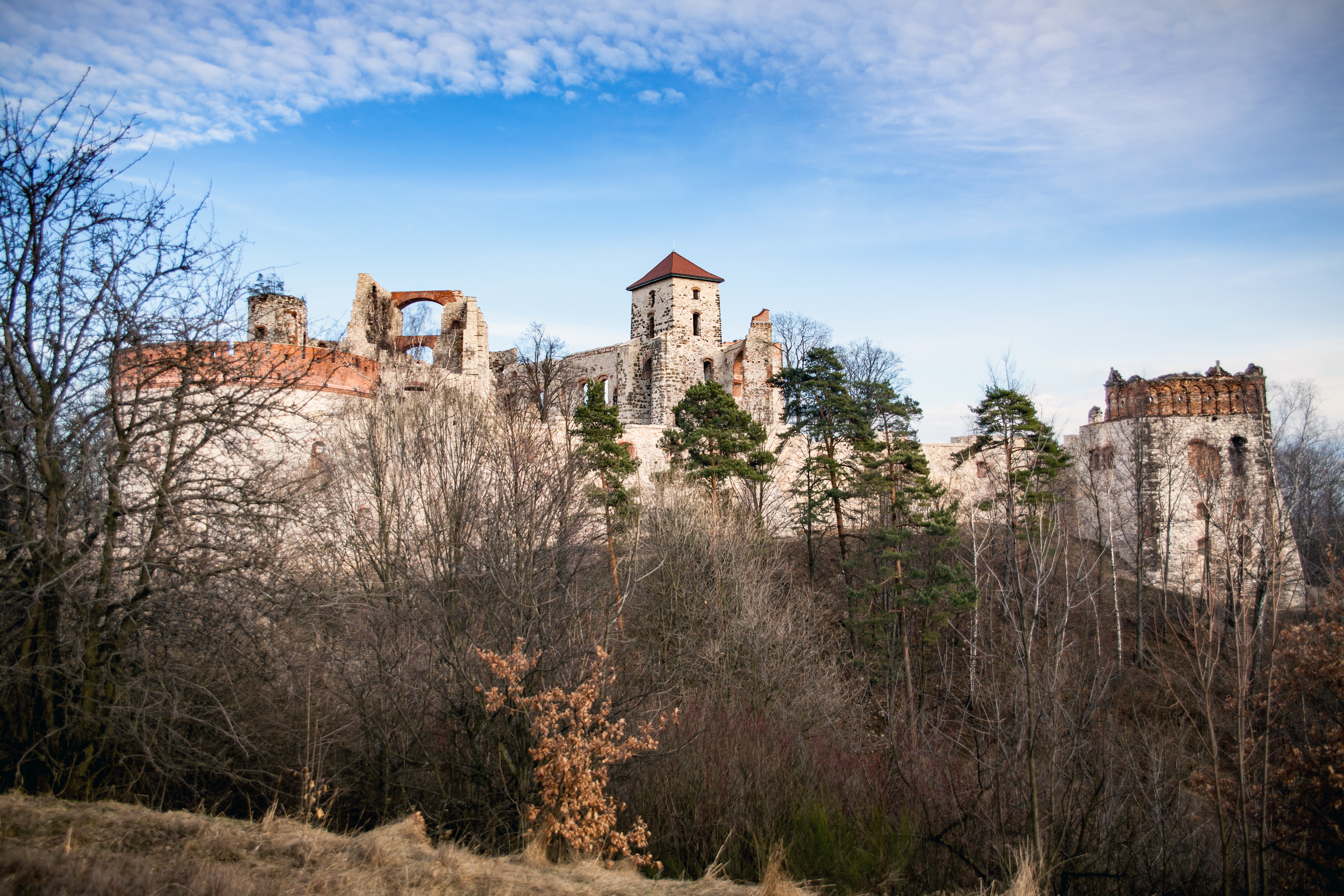
- Interactive map of the Tenczyn Castle area

General information
- Architectural style: Polish Gothic-Polish Mannerism
- Location: Rudno, Poland
- Construction started: 1319
- Completed: 15th century
- Demolished: 1655-1656, 1768

Tenczyn Castle, also known as Tęczyn Castle, is a medieval castle in the village of Rudno in the Polish Jura, Poland. It was built as a seat of the powerful Tęczyński family. The castle fell into disrepair during the Deluge in mid-17th century, after being pillaged and burned by Swedish-Brandenburgian forces looking for the Polish Crown Jewels and rumored treasures of the Tęczyński family. Subsequently rebuilt, it again fell into disrepair after a major fire in the mid-18th century and remains in that state to this day.

The castle stands on the remnants of a Permian period lava stream, the highest hill of Garb Tenczyński (Castle Hill), which is 411 m above the sea level.

== History ==
According to legend, Tynek Starża, a founding member of the Tęczyńskis, arrived in the area in the 9th century, founded Tyniec, and built a castle named after and for his daughter Tęcza (Rainbow).

The first mention of the stronghold in writing is dated to 24 September 1308, when King Władysław I the Elbow-high, who was hunting in the woods around Thanczin, issued a diploma to the Cistercian monastery in Sulejów. It is believed that the first wooden castle structure was erected around 1319 by Jan Nawój of Morawica, Castellan of Cracow. He also built the largest of the castle towers, called today the Nawojowa tower. The medieval castle included three additional round Gothic towers. Further expansion was carried out by Jan's son Jędrzej, governor of Cracow and Sandomierz, who erected the north-east part of the structure. He established a residence in the castle, dying there in 1368. Jędrzej is known as the first person to take the name Tęczyński. Jędrzej's son Jasko renewed and significantly expanded the castle, and founded a chapel within. The first recorded direct mention of the castle dates from this period. The king Władysław Jagiełło imprisoned some important Teutonic prisoners, captured during the Battle of Grunwald, in the castle. To commemorate this event one of the castle's turrets was named Grunwaldzka.

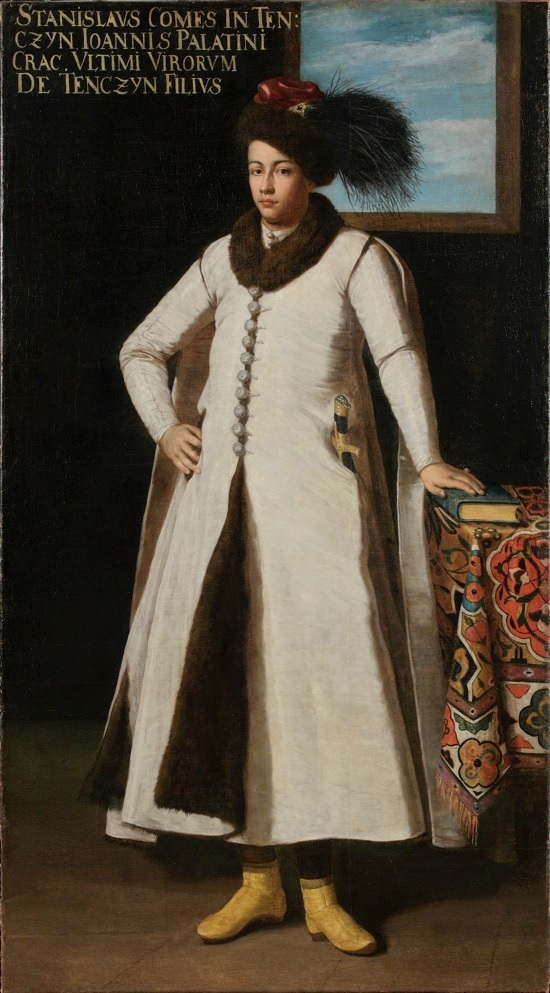
Portrait of Stanisław Tęczyński by Tommaso Dolabella, 1633. The painting is one of the portraits from the castle's gallery.

Within a short period of time, the Tęczyński family rose to great importance in Poland, holding 45 estates, of which 15 were near the castle. Around the middle of the sixteenth century, the castle was frequented by Mikołaj Rej, Jan Kochanowski, Piotr Kochanowski and other important figures of the Polish Renaissance. According to Bartosz Paprocki, Jan Tęczyński, Castellan of Wojnicz, "at great cost built a new castle in Tęczyn" in 1570. The new mannerist structure had three wings with a central courtyard that opened to the west and was adorned with Renaissance attics, cornices and arcades. It was surrounded by a curtain wall in the north, strengthened with a bastion entry (barbican). Two pentagonal bastions were erected in the south. After the reconstruction, the castle took the shape of an irregular polygon, measuring over 140 meters from east to west, and 130 meters from north to south. Italian-style gardens and vineyards stretched out below the castle. The last big expenditure on the castle was a thorough reconstruction of the castle chapel, completed in the early 17th century by Agnieszka Firlejowa née Tęczyńska. In 1637 Jan Magnus Tęczyński, the last representative of the family, died in the castle. His only daughter Izabela married Łukasz Opalinski.

In 1655, during the Deluge, a rumor was spread that Jerzy Sebastian Lubomirski, Grand Marshal of the Crown, had hidden the Polish Crown Jewels in Tenczyn Castle. Swedish-Brandenburgian forces led by Kurt Christoph von Königsmarck captured the castle from a defence led by Captain Jan Dziula and slaughtered all of its defenders. When they did not find treasure, they left the fortress and burned it in July 1656. After the Deluge, the castle was for the most part rebuilt and partially inhabited. At the beginning of the 18th century, ownership of the Tenczyn estates was passed to Adam Mikołaj Sieniawski and later to Prince August Aleksander Czartoryski, who had married with Sieniawski's only daughter Maria Zofia. The castle was eventually passed to the Prince's daughter Izabela Lubomirska.

After the fire in 1768, the structure increasingly fell into disrepair. In 1783, the remains of Jan Magnus Tęczyński were moved from the castle chapel to a new tomb in St. Catherine's Church in Tenczynek. In 1816, the castle became the property of the Potocki family and remained in their hands until the outbreak of World War II in 1939.

== Plan of the castle ==
A hypothetical reconstruction of the castle's full layout was drawn based on the research of Władysław Łuszczkiewicz, Nikodem Pajzderski, Stanisław Polaczek, Bohdan Guerquin, Marian Kornecki, Teresa Małkowska-Holcerowa and Janusz Kurtyka. Identification of the premises was based on division acts from 1553 and 1733 and a drawing by Erik Dahlbergh from 1655.

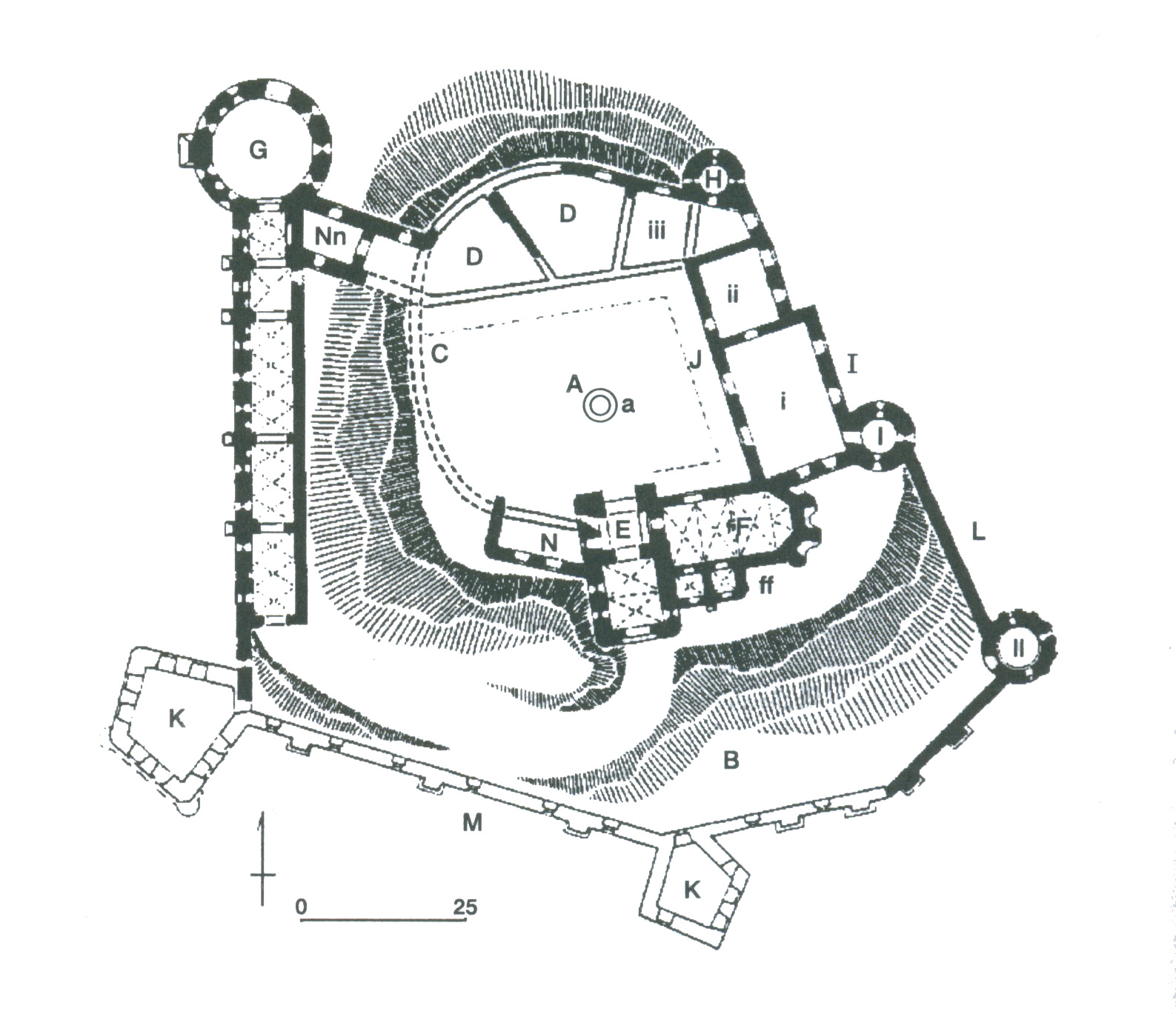
Plan of the castle

=== Legend ===
- A - Upper Castle (14th century) with well (1655, "a")
- B - Lower castle (14th / 15th century), Tenczyn castle cum muro exteriori (1410), ward (1553)
- C - Reconstruction of the demolished peripheral wall from the 14th and 15th century (Guerquin)
- D - 14th century dwelling house (Guerquin), stables, kitchens, a bakery, a coach house (1553, 1733)
- E - Tower Gate, so called Nawojowa tower (14th or 14th / 15th century), turris altissima ad portom arcis (1655)
- F - Chapel (14th-15th century)
  - ff - Vestry and treasury (17th century)
- G - Barbican and structure protecting the entrance to the castle (late 15th / 16th century or the beginning of the 17th century, 1655)
- H - "Dorotka" tower from the 14th / 15th century (1553)
- I - State rooms (15th century)
  - i - the "great hall" 1553, a dining room with a stove, the Tęczyński coat of arms and 15 portraits, (1733)
  - ii - the chamber leading from the "great hall" to the "room with 5 windows" (1733)
  - iii - the "crooked room" with 2 portraits (1733)
- J - Arcades (1579-1584)
- K - Turret (late 16th / 17th century)
- L - Walls and two towers of the inner ward prior to 1579 (15th century)
- I - A tower from the 15th century, "bathroom" /1553/ = "the Empty tower" /1733/
- II - A tower from the 15th century, possibly a prison
- M - The walls of the inner ward after the establishment of bastion fortifications (16th / 17th century)
- N - Guard and staff accommodation
- Nn - Rectangular tower (probably the oldest Tower Gate of the 14th century, later absorbed by the buildings).

== See also ==
- Trail of the Eagles' Nests
- List of mannerist structures in Southern Poland
- Castles in Poland

== Bibliography ==
- Marek Żukow-Karczewski, Tenczyn - zamek bastejowy Tenczyńskich / Tenczyn - a "Bastille"-type castle of the Tenczynski family, "Aura" 2, 1990, p. 19-21. (in Polish and English)
