= Białężyce Palace =

- Pałac w Białężcyach
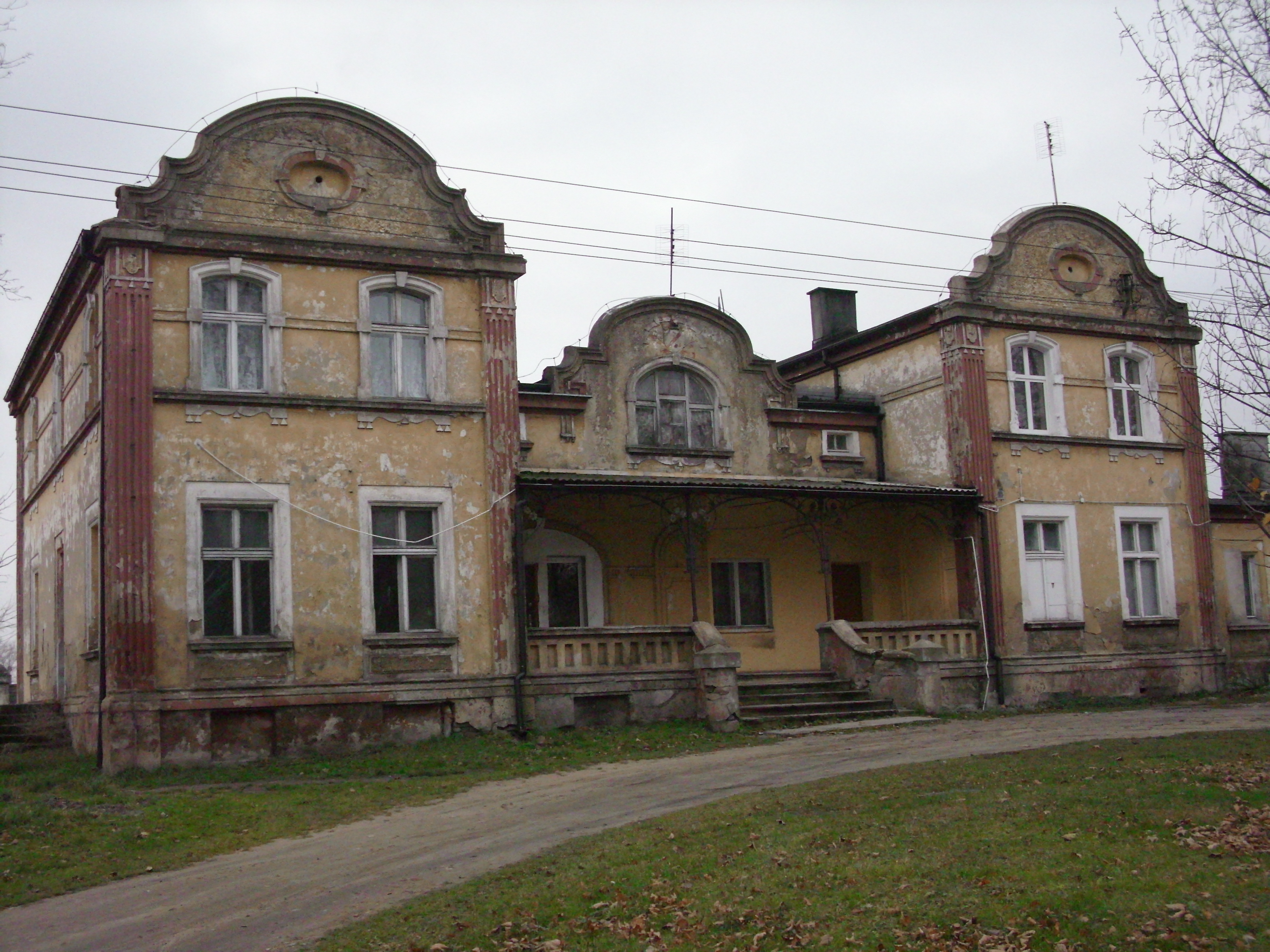

- Location within Poland

General information
- Type: Palace
- Architectural style: eclecticism
- Location: Białężyce, Poland, Poland
- Coordinates: 52°18′28.27″N 17°31′58.37″E
- Owner: Gmina Września

Białężyce Palace (Polish: Pałac w Białężycach) is eclecticism palace in Białężyce, built in the early 20th century. Currently it is the property of Gmina Września.

== Description ==
The palace is built on a rectangular plan, consists of storey main body, porch to front elevation and storey lateral wings. All decorated semicircular, corrugated peaks. In the interwar period the estate of farm buildings belonged to the Opaliński family. In 1926 the palace had 259 acres. After World War II intended for the council housing. The palace is surrounded by a landscape park of the 19th century.

== Bibliography ==
- https://web.archive.org/web/20140220205704/http://www.rotmanka.com/zamki/index.php?option=com_content&task=view&id=1893&Itemid=32
- http://www.polskiezabytki.pl/m/obiekt/5584/Bialezyce/
- http://www.polskaniezwykla.pl/web/place/19679,bialezyce-dwor-franciszka-opielinskiego.html

Palace in Białężycach, vector graphics
