= Łukasz Opaliński (1612–1666) =

Polish nobleman

- Łukasz Opaliński
- Coat of arms: Clan Łodzia
- Born: 1612; Sieraków
- Died: June 15, 1666 (aged 53–54); Rytwiany
- Noble family: Opaliński
- Consort: Izabela Tęczyńska (1639)
- Father: Piotr Opaliński
- Mother: Zofia Kostka

Łukasz de Bnin Opaliński (Latin: Luca Opalinius; 1612 – June 15, 1666) was a Polish nobleman, poet, political activist and one of the most important Polish political writers of the 17th century.

== Life ==
He was Lord Starost Pobiedziński since 1631, Podkomorzy of Kalisz 1638-1640 and Podkomorzy of Poznań since 1640. He was Court Marshal of the Crown since 1650. He also served as Marshal of the regular Sejm from March 10 to May 1, 1638, in Warsaw. He was the brother of Krzysztof Opaliński.

Opaliński was educated at the Lubrański Academy in Poznań, and also at the University of Leuven, the University of Orléans, the University of Strasbourg and the University of Padua.

Marriage with Izabela Tęczyńska in 1639 allowed him to inherit the significant estates of the Tęczyński family. Bibliophile himself, just like his brother, he expanded the library inherited from Izabela's uncle, Jan Tęczyński. His library was reckoned to be one of the largest private book collections in Europe and he had contacts with most of the printers in Europe, often receiving the first editions of many important works. He had three children with Izabela: Jan Opaliński, Stanisław Opaliński and Zofia Opalińska.

At the age of 20 during the Election Sejm of 1632, he voted for king Vladislaus IV Vasa. Active politician, participant of many Sejms and Sejm commissions (military, treasury, diplomacy). He advocated criticized the shortcomings of the Golden Liberty and demanded political reforms, among them the reformation of Sejm deliberation procedures (in his Rozmowa Plebana z Ziemianinem... (Conversations of a Parson with a Country Squire), 1641), opposed liberum veto and abuse of power by magnates (in his Coś nowego..., 1652). After the death of Vladislaus IV he supported the election of his brother, John II Casimir and supported him during the Swedish invasion The Deluge, even after his brother Krzysztof Opaliński defected to the Swedes in 1655. Supported the vivente rege proposals at the Sejms of 1661 and 1662.

In 1652 he was the chairman of the Sejm Tribunal which banished Hieronim Radziejowski for collaboration with the Swedes.

In 1661 he was a cofounder of the first Polish newspaper, the Merkuriusz Polski. That year he published Poeta nowy (New Poet), the first work in Polish on the principles of poetry.

== Death ==
He died in Rytwiany.

== Works ==
- Rozmowa plebana z ziemianinem albo Dyskurs o postanowieniu teraźniejszym Rzeczypospolitej i o sposobie zawierania sejmów (1641) (Conversation between plebeian and a country squire, or a discourse about current activities in Rzeczpospolita and how the Sejm's are created) - anonymously
- Polonia defensa contra Joannem Barclaium (1648, in Latin) (Defense of Poland to John Barclay)- a reply to Icon Animorum of John Barclay, which Łukasz considered an unfair depiction of Poland
- Coś nowego... (1652) (Something new...)
- De officiis libri tres (1659) - textbook on ethics, used by many Jesuit schools and often reprinted
- Poeta nowy (c. 1661) (New Poet)
