= Rudno, Lesser Poland Voivodeship =

Rudno
- Village
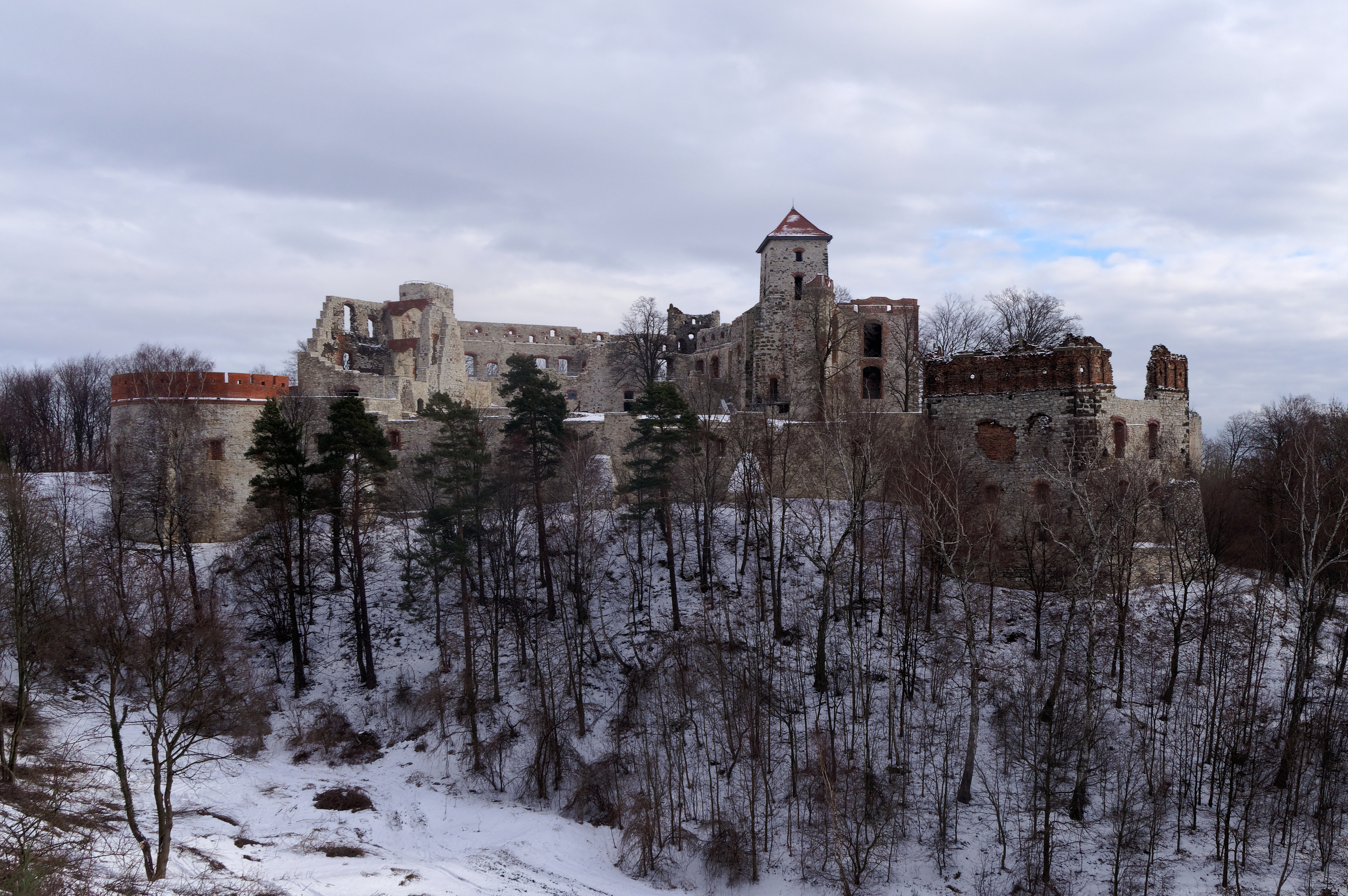
- Tenczyn Castle

- Location within Poland
- Coordinates: 50°5′52″N 19°35′6″E
- Country: Poland
- Voivodeship: Lesser Poland
- County: Kraków
- Gmina: Krzeszowice

Rudno [ˈrudnɔ] is a village in the administrative district of Gmina Krzeszowice, within Kraków County, Lesser Poland Voivodeship, in southern Poland.

== History ==
The village developed beneath the 14th century Tenczyn Castle, the seat of the Tęczyński family, turning increasingly into a ruin after a fire in the mid-18th century.
