= Jan Opaliński (died 1598) =

Polish nobleman (1546–1598)

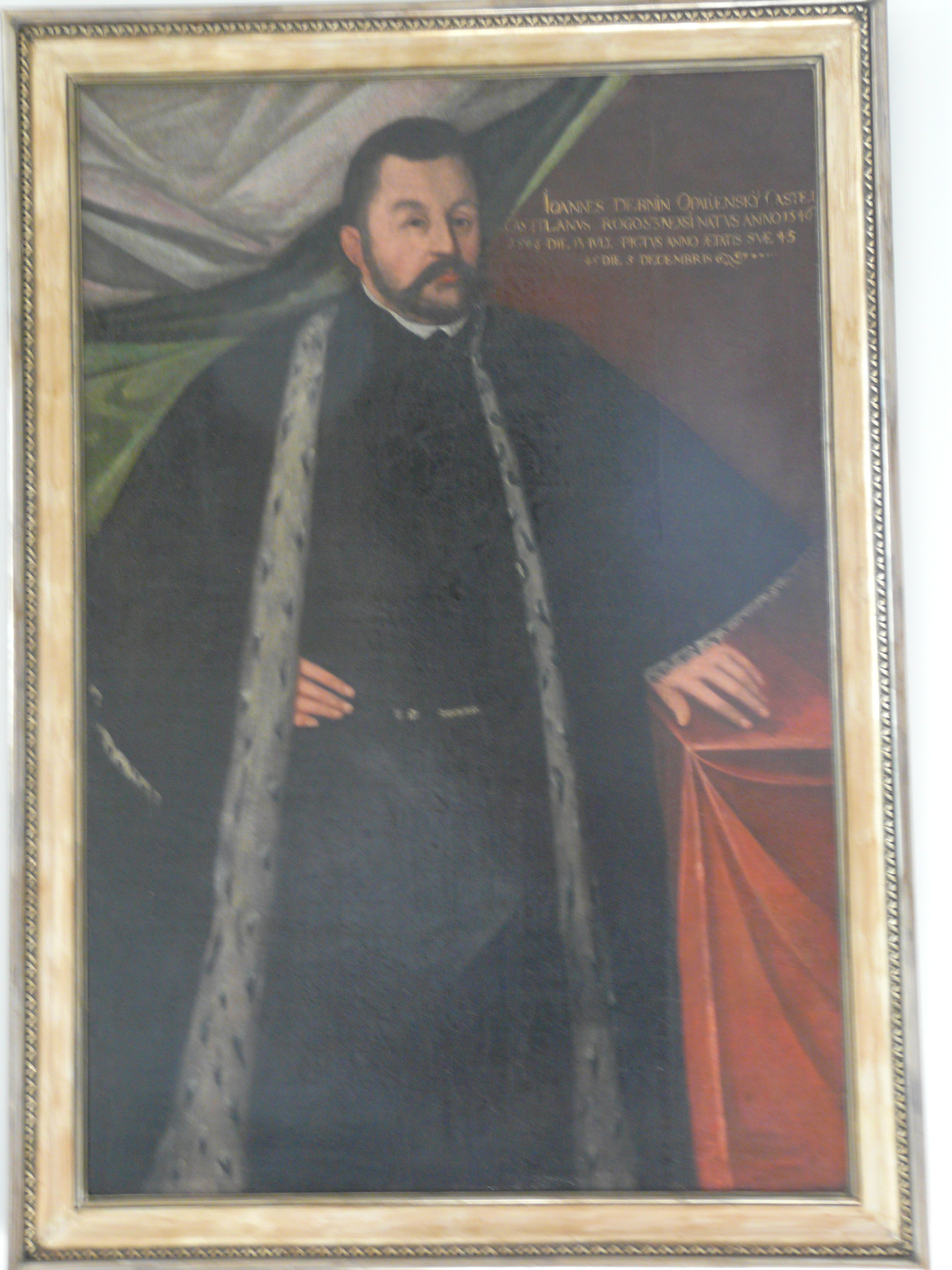
- Jan Opaliński

- Coat of arms
- Born: 13 August 1546
- Died: 10 February 1598 (aged 51)
- Residence: Opalenica
- Noble family: Opaliński family
- Spouse: Barbara of Ostroróg (Ostrorożanka) Lwowska
- Issue: Jan; Piotr; Anna; Zofia
- Father: Jan Opaliński
- Mother: Anna Gostyńska

Jan Opaliński (13 August 1546 – 10 February 1598) was a Polish nobleman of Łodzia coat of arms. Castellan of Rogozin and a bibliophile, he was the starosta of Pobiedziska and the owner of the towns Opalenica, Czerniejewo and Sieraków.

== Biography ==
=== Family ===
He was born on 13 August 1546 to castellan of Santok Jan (1519–1561) and Anna Borek Gostyńska. On 17 April 1580, in Lwówek he married Barbara of Ostroróg (Ostrorożanka) Lwowska, daughter of Wojciech and Zofia Zborowska. Their wedding was infamous among contemporary memoirists because of accidents and quarrels. He was the father of the voivode Jan (1581–1637), Piotr, and two daughters (Zofia, wife of Andrzej Leszczyński, and Anna, wife of Zygmunt Grudziński). Barbara, his widow, lived until 1604; she contributed to the expansion of Opalenica.

=== Career and politics ===
Having lost his father at the age of 15, he was brought up under the care of his uncle Andrzej. In his youth he travelled and stayed at European royal courts.

After his father’s death he also inherited the town of Opalenica with the surrounding villages, where he resided. According to one source, after his father’s death in 1561 he also inherited his father’s royal tenancy of Pobiedziska, which in 1592 he transferred to his son; according to another, he was starosta of Pobiedziska from 1565. Thanks to Andrzej’s intercession with the chancellor Zamoyski, he became the castellan of Rogoźno from 12 October 1578 until his death. In 1591 he purchased the town of Sieraków with surrounding villages, and in 1595 the town of Czerniejewo.

After the death of Stephen Báthory, during the election of 1587, acting actively at several Greater Poland assemblies of the nobility (including in Środa), he supported the candidacy of Archduke Maximilian. He was active in the Greater Poland sejmiks (also in Środa), among others in the years 1589–1594, although his deteriorating health caused a decline in his importance after 1589.

=== Personal life ===
He was known as a bibliophile and had a large library in his residence in Opalenica.

His dispute with the abbot of Trzemeszno became well known among his contemporaries, even becoming a subject of discussion in the national Sejm.

He died on 10 February 1598.
