= Jan Tęczyński (1485–1553) =

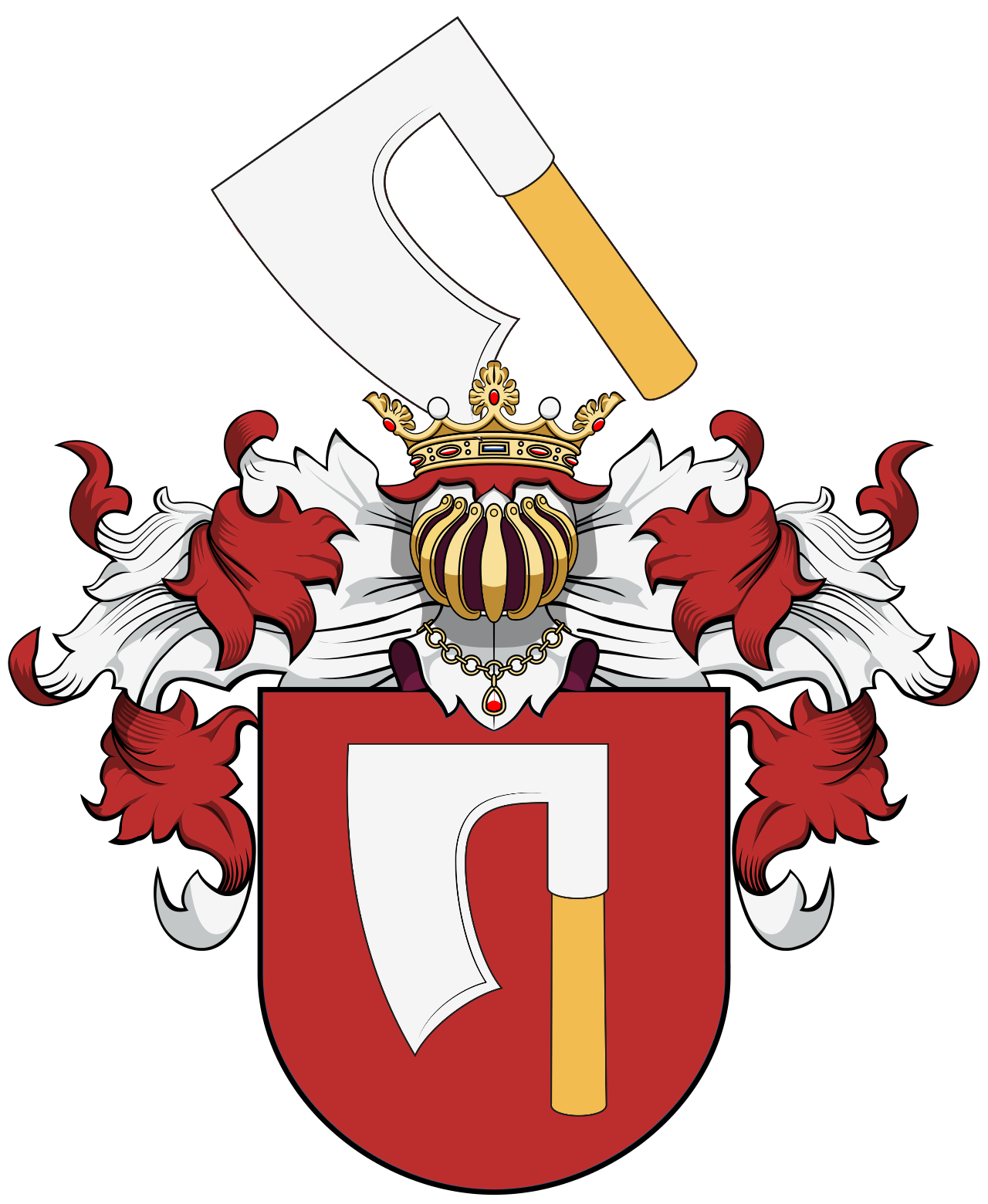
Topór coat of arms

John Gabriel Tęczyński (1484 – 21 May 1553) was a Polish nobleman. He was Chamberlain (1515) and voivode of Sandomierz (1543), Castellan (1518) and the governor of Lublin, the Speaker of the court of the Crown (1522), Castellan of Wojnicki (1535), Count of the Holy Roman Empire (1527).

== Family ==
Born in 1485 into the Szlachta Topór coat of arms to mother Anna Konińska of Konin (d. after 25 December 1534) of the House of Tęczyński and his father Jan Koniński. His Grandfather was Gabriel Tęczyński (b. c. 1430, d. 1497) and uncles Stanislaus Tęczyński and Andrew Tęczyński (d. 1561) (b. approx. 1480), and four sisters.

His wife Dobrochna Sapieżanka h. Fox (died after 1512) was the daughter of Jana Sapiehy a royal secretary and chancellor of Queen Helena, the governor of Podlasie and Marshall of the Grand Duchy of Lithuania. They had a son Stanislav Gabriel Tęczyński (1514–1560/1561) who was Castellan of Lviv, and provincial governor of Kraków, and a daughter Beata Tęczyńską (born c. 1520), whose husband was John Zabrzeziński – the son of Jan Jurjewicz Zabrzeziński. His second wife Anna was the daughter of John and Anna Buczacki.

== Early life ==
In his youth he studied at the Academy of Kraków and grew up at the court in Königsberg where he was a close confidant of Queen Bona; In 1510, together with his brothers and Stanislaw Andrzej he purchased half of Kraśnik In 1527, Emperor Charles V granted him the title of Count Imperia Sacri Romani and Polish King Sigismund I made him ambassador to the kings of Hungary and Czech.

== Career ==
A successful politician at court, he was:

- standard bearer (1516–1518), governor (1530–1552) and Castellan (1518–1535) for Lublin,
- Speaker of the court (1529–1552),
- Castellan of Wojnice (1535–1542),
- Governor of Sandomierz (1542–1552) and Lelow (1533–1552).
- owner of the village of Kraśnik where he built a wooden church and a hospital for the poor. In 1541 he granted the town a fair day.

He died on 21 May 1553 and was buried in Kraśnik.
