= Zbigniew Tęczyński =

Polish noble (c. 1450 – 1498)

- Born: c. 1450
- Died: between 11 August and 13 December 1498
- Other name: Zbigniew z Tęczyna
- Children: Andrzej Tęczyński
- Parent: Jan Tęczyński

Zbigniew Tęczyński, Zbigniew z Tęczyna (c. 1450 – 1498) was a Polish sword-bearer of the Crown (Polish: miecznik koronny; 1474–1482), chamberlain of Kraków (before 1481–1498), starosta of Malbork (1485–1496), general starosta (starosta generalny) of Prussia, starosta of Kalisz (1495), starosta of Lviv (since 1497) and trustworthy counsellor of Kazimierz IV Jagiellończyk. Member of the Tęczyński family.
