= Sieraków Landscape Park =

Protected area in Poland

- Sierakowski Park Krajobrazowy
- IUCN category V (protected landscape/seascape)
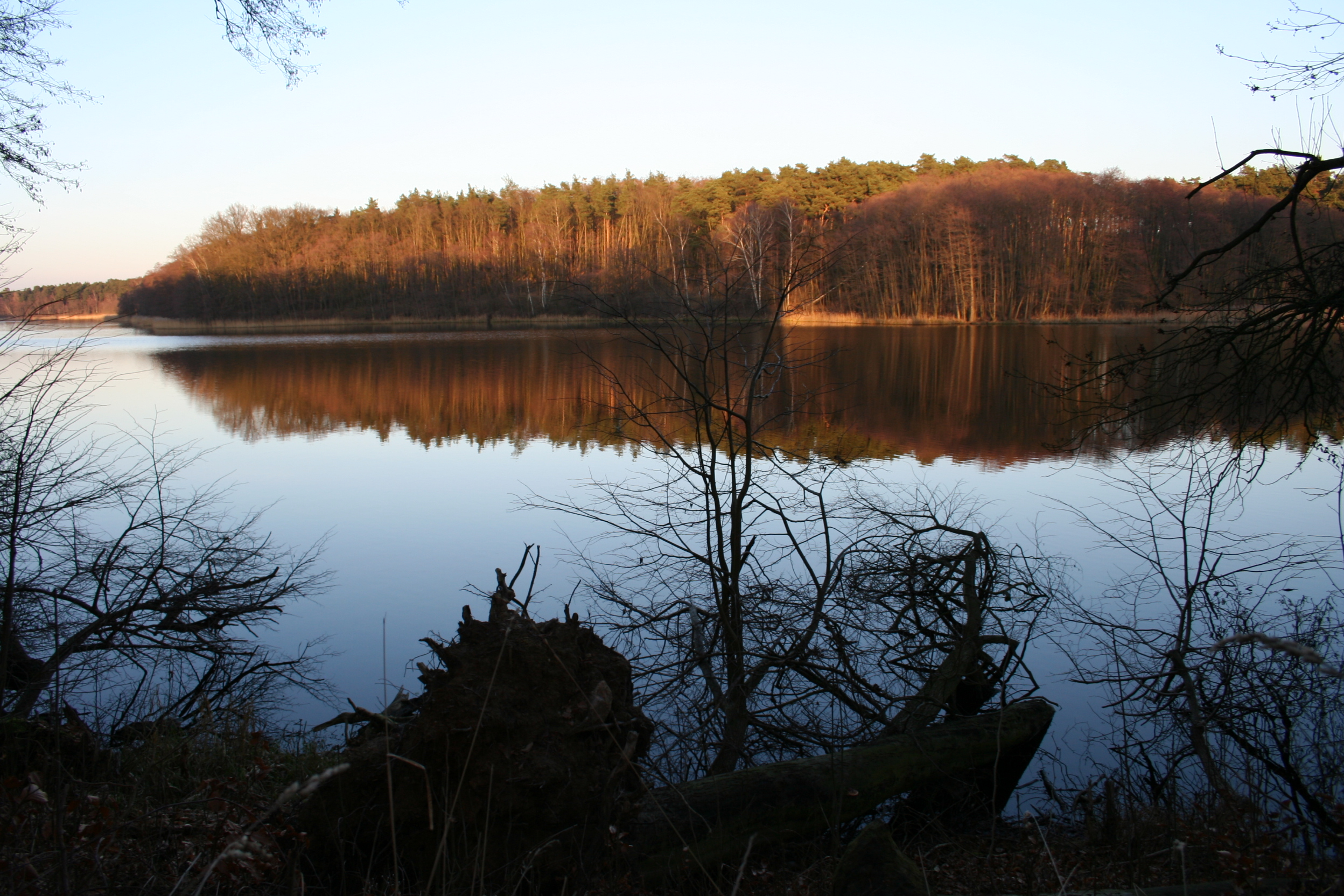
- Lutomskie Lake
- Interactive map of Sieraków Landscape Park
- Location: Greater Poland Voivodeship
- Coordinates: 52°39′N 16°6′E

Sieraków Landscape Park (Sierakowski Park Krajobrazowy) is a protected area (Landscape Park) in west-central Poland.

The Park lies within Greater Poland Voivodeship, in the area around the town of Sieraków.

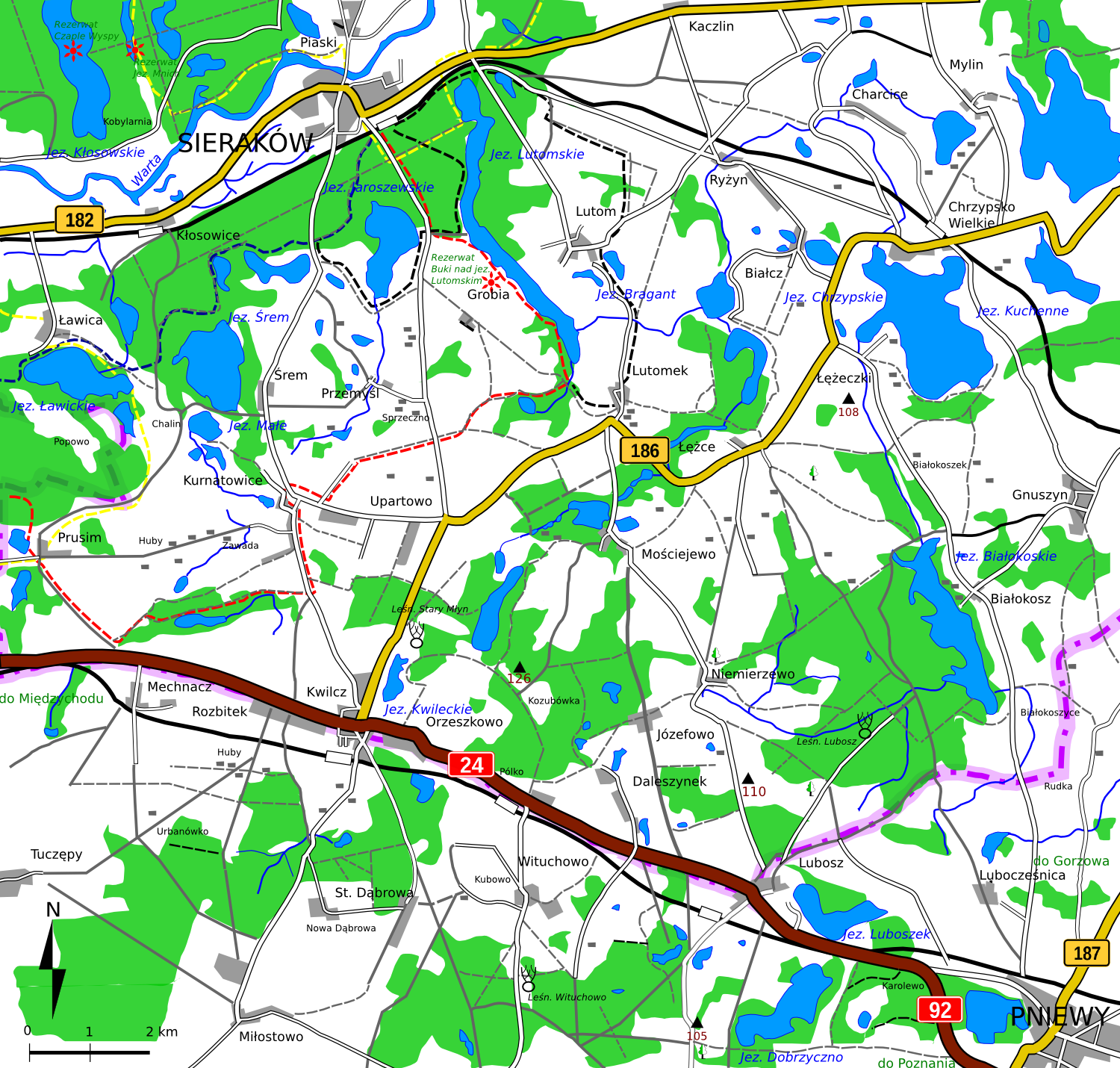
Map of the park
