= Lewis Naphtali Dembitz =

American lawyer

Lewis N. Dembitz
- Born: February 3, 1833; Zirke, Prussia
- Died: March 11, 1907 (aged 74); Louisville, Kentucky
- Occupation: Legal scholar

Lewis Naphtali Dembitz (February 3, 1833 – March 11, 1907) was a German American legal scholar. He influenced his nephew Louis Brandeis, who admired him greatly, to choose law as a profession.

Born into a Jewish family in Zirke, in the Prussian province of Posen, he attended gymnasium in Frankfurt, Sagan, and Glogau. After one semester at the Charles University in Prague studying law, he emigrated to the United States in 1849. He continued to study American law in offices at Cincinnati, Ohio, and Madison, Indiana. After doing journalistic work for a time, he began in 1853 to practice law in Louisville, Kentucky, where he remained for the rest of his career.

Politically active, Dembitz was a delegate to the 1860 Republican National Convention, assistant city attorney of Louisville, 1884–1888, and was a commissioner for Kentucky to the Conference for the Uniformity of State Laws. In 1888, Dembitz drafted the first Australian ballot law ever adopted in the United States, to govern elections in Louisville. His legal works include: Kentucky Jurisprudence, 1890; Law Language for Shorthand Writers, 1892; and Land Titles in the United States, 2 vols., 1895. He is the author of "The Question of Silver Coinage," in the Present Problem Series, 1896, No. 1; and has written a number of book-reviews for The Nation, 1888–97, besides articles in other magazines and in newspapers.

Dembitz was strongly attached to conservative Judaism. He was one of the early members of the executive board of the Union of American Hebrew Congregations, and in 1878 a member of the commission on the plan of study for the Hebrew Union College. In 1898 he acted as chairman at a convention of Orthodox congregations, and was elected a vice-president of the Union of Orthodox Jewish Congregations of America. In addition to memoirs, articles, and addresses which have appeared in Jewish papers, he published Jewish Services in Synagogue and Home, 1898; "The Lost Tribes," in the Andover Review, August 1889; and revised Exodus and Leviticus for the new translation of the Bible by the Jewish Publication Society of America eventually published in 1917.
