= Sieraków =

Town in Greater Poland Voivodeship, Poland

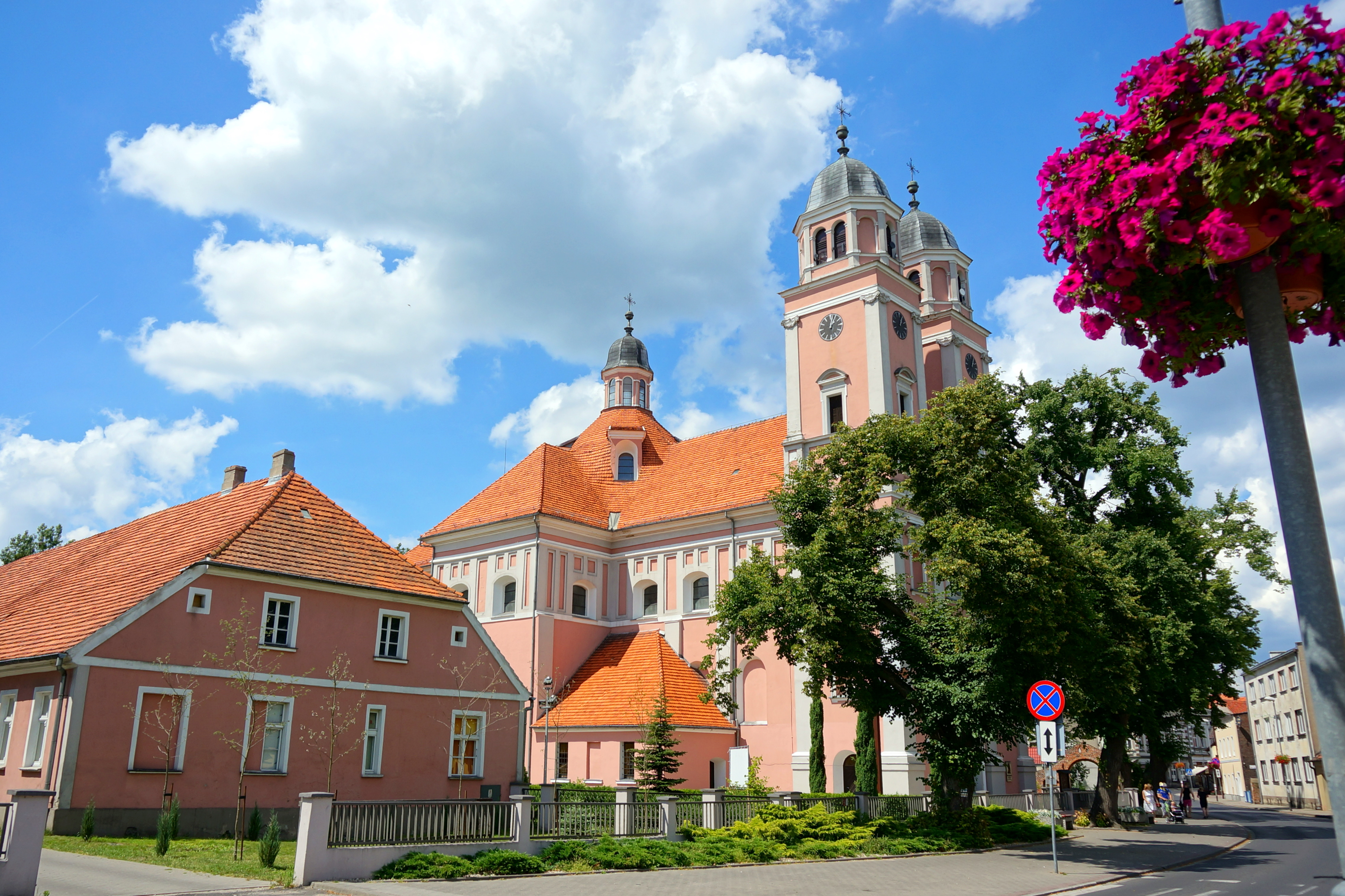
- Church of the Immaculate Conception of the Virgin Mary and the Bernardine monastery

- Flag Coat of arms Wordmark

- Location within Poland
- Coordinates: 52°39′0″N 16°6′0″E
- Country: Poland
- Voivodeship: Greater Poland
- County: Międzychód
- Gmina: Sieraków
- Established: 13th century
- Town rights: before 1388

Government
  - Mayor: Witold Bruno Maciołek

Area
  - Total: 14.1 km^{2} (5.4 sq mi)
- Elevation: 31 m (102 ft)

Population (2012)
  - Total: 8,768
  - Density: 622/km^{2} (1,610/sq mi)
- Time zone: UTC+1 (CET)
  - Summer (DST): UTC+2 (CEST)
- Postal code: 64-410
- Area code: +48 61
- Vehicle registration: PMI
- Website: http://www.sierakow.pl

Sieraków (Polish pronunciation: [ɕɛˈrakuf]) is a town in western Poland with 8,768 inhabitants (2012). Located by the Warta River, it is situated in the Międzychód County in the Greater Poland Voivodeship. Sieraków is known as a holiday destination with well-developed tourism and sport infrastructure. It is surrounded by extensive areas of forest and lakes, including the protected area called Sieraków Landscape Park.

== History ==
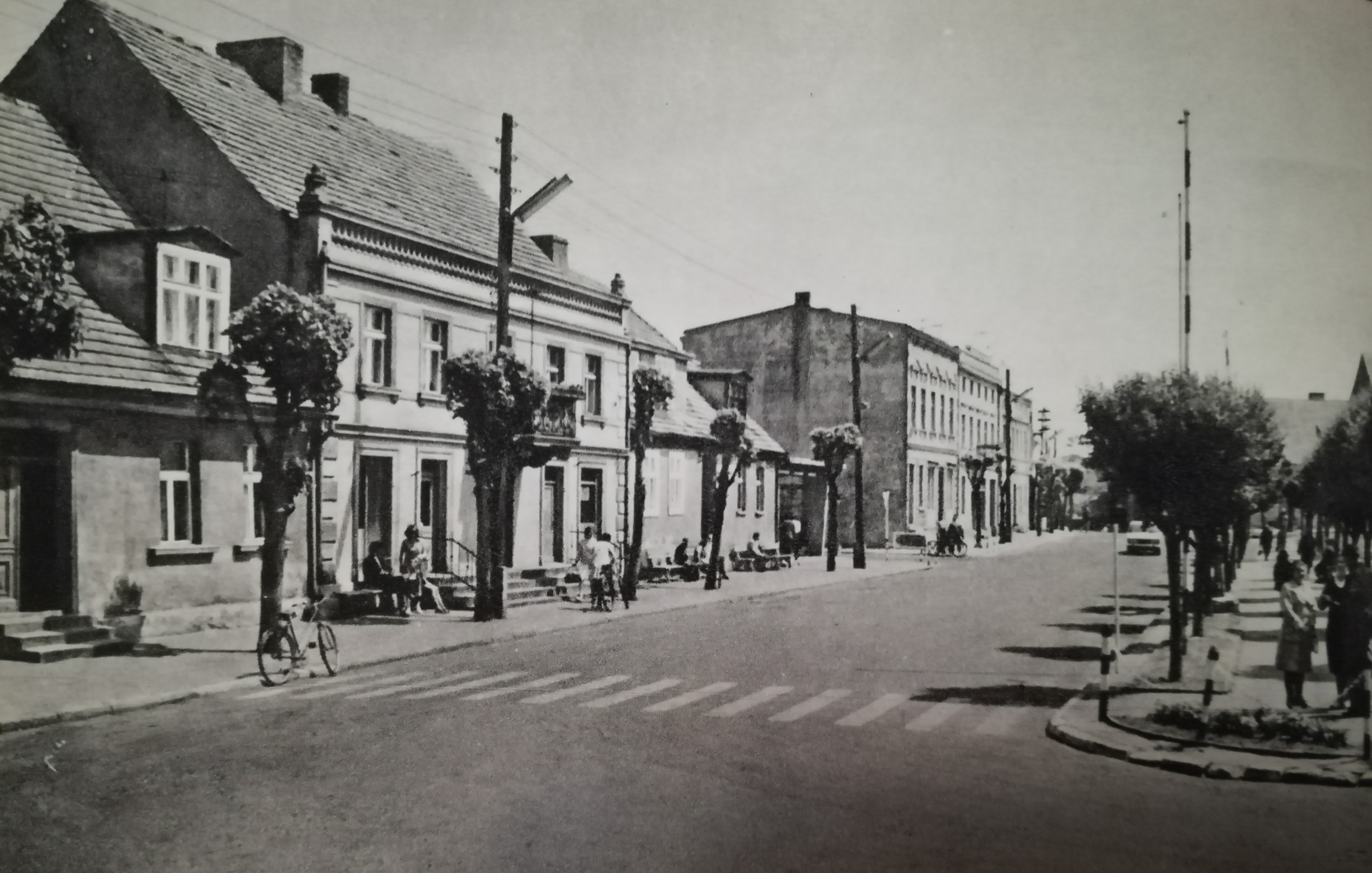
Sieraków in 1973

As part of the region of Greater Poland, i.e. the cradle of the Polish state, the area formed part of Poland since its establishment in the 10th century. It was a private town, administratively located in the Poznań County in the Poznań Voivodeship in the Greater Poland Province of the Kingdom of Poland.

During the Second Partition of Poland in 1793, Sieraków, under its Germanized name Zirke was annexed by the Kingdom of Prussia. Following the successful Greater Poland uprising of 1806, it was regained by Poles and included within the short-lived Duchy of Warsaw. After the duchy's dissolution in 1815, it was re-annexed by Prussia. The local population was subjected to Germanisation policies. In 1871, it also became part of Germany and was located in the Birnbaum district in the Prussian Province of Posen. According to the census of 1871, the town had a population of 2,527, of which 1,130 (44.7%) were Poles.

The town was captured by Polish insurgents in the Greater Poland uprising in 1919 and was subsequently assigned to the Second Polish Republic through the Treaty of Versailles. During World War II in 1939, the town was occupied by Nazi Germany and was annexed as part of the Birnbaum district in Reichsgau Wartheland. In 1939–1940, the occupiers carried out expulsions of Poles, whose houses were then handed over to German colonists as part of the Lebensraum policy. The Polish resistance was active in the town. The leader of the local unit of the Grey Ranks was arrested by the Gestapo in 1943 and sent to prisons in Poznań and eventually to the Mauthausen concentration camp where he died in 1944. Towards the end of the war in 1945, it was captured by the Red Army and was restored to Poland.

In 1975–1998, it was administratively located in the Poznań Voivodeship.

== Demographics ==
Historical population

Year	Pop.	±%
1871	2,527	—
1880	2,944	+16.5%
1890	2,926	−0.6%
1900	2,873	−1.8%
1910	3,216	+11.9%

Year	Pop.	±%
1921	2,791	−13.2%
1931	3,017	+8.1%
1950	3,461	+14.7%
1960	4,128	+19.3%
2010	6,091	+47.6%

== Notable residents ==
- Lewis Naphtali Dembitz (1833–1907), German American legal scholar
- Raphael Lasker (1838–1904), German-American rabbi
- Hartmut Neugebauer (1942-2017) German actor and voice actor
- Krzysztof Opaliński (1611-1655), Polish nobleman and political satirist

== Gallery ==
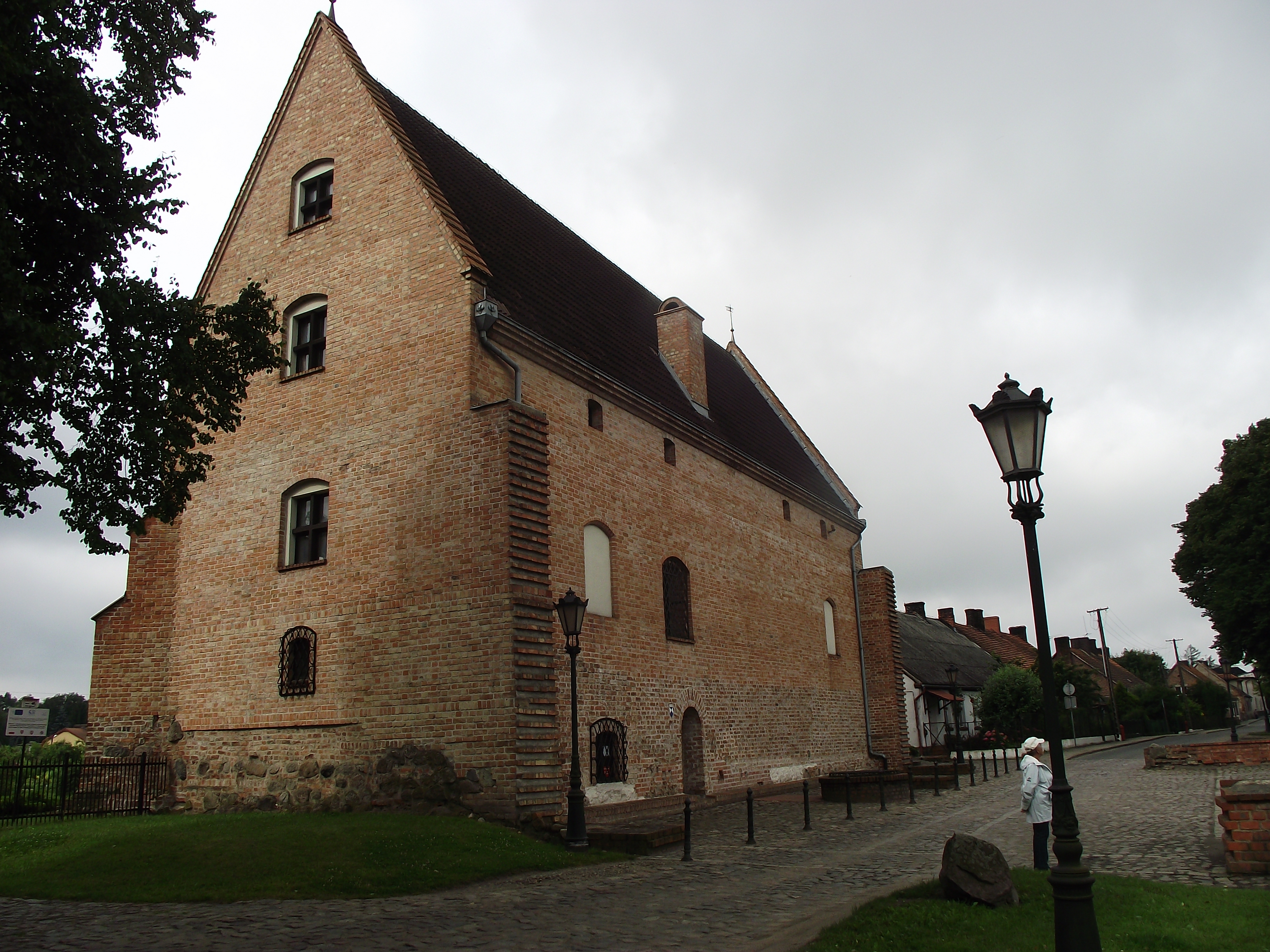
Opaliński Castle Museum

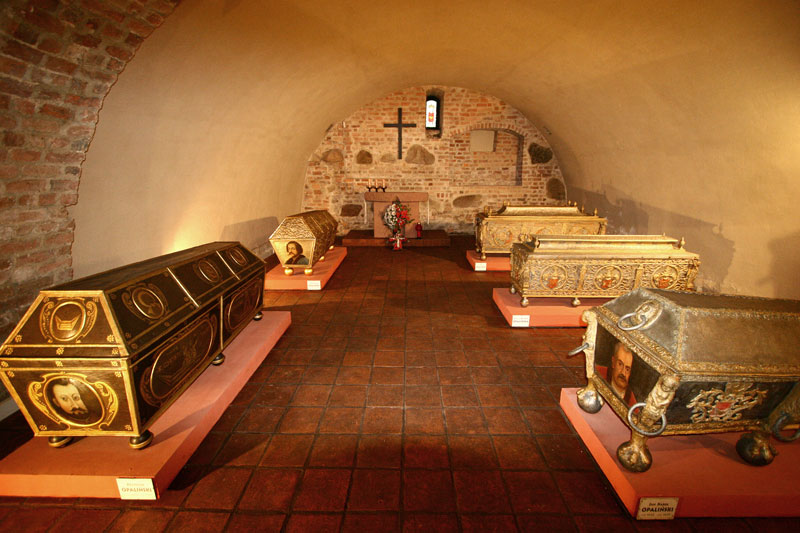
Opaliński family sarcophagus in castle's basement

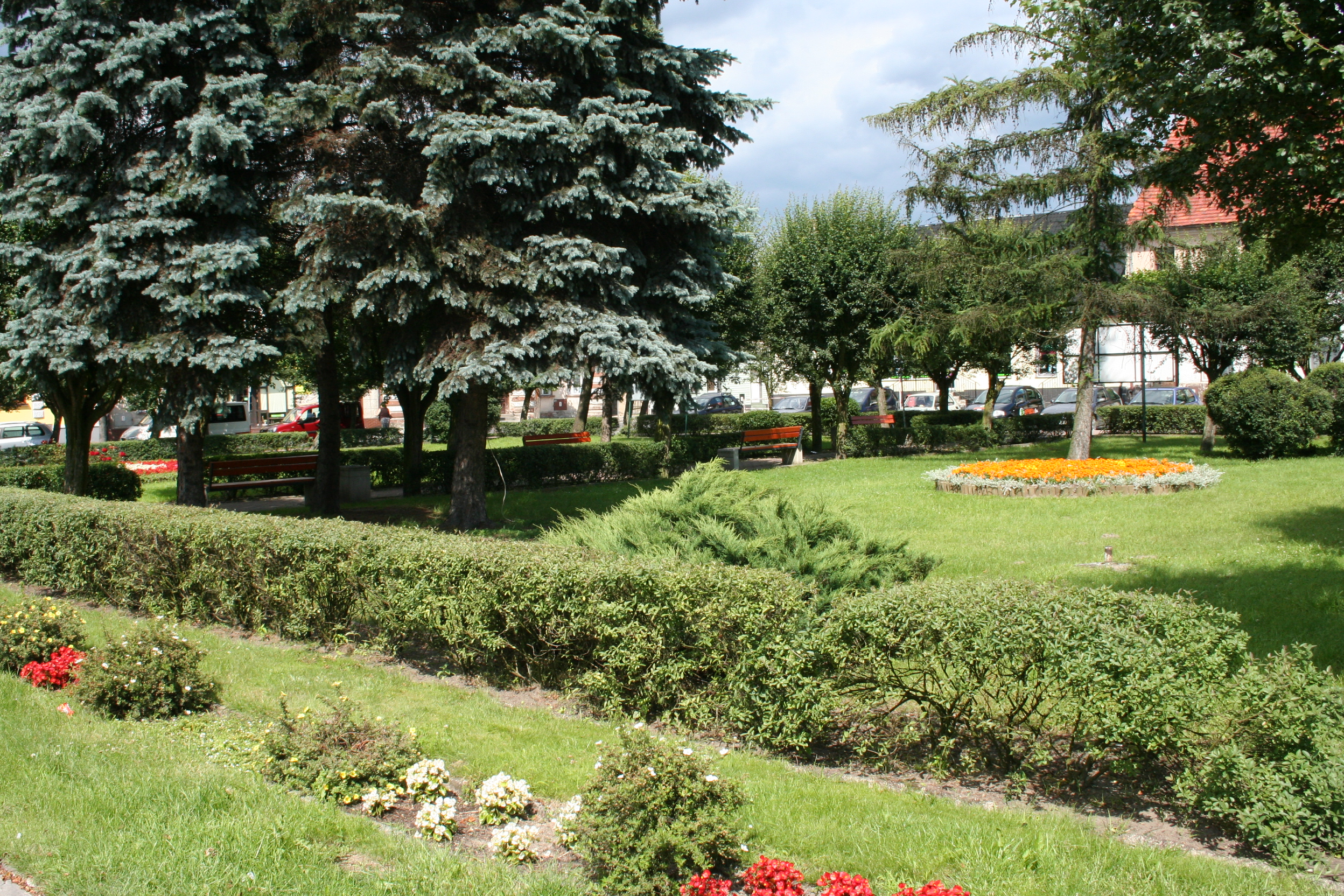
Plac Powstańców Wielkopolskich (main square)

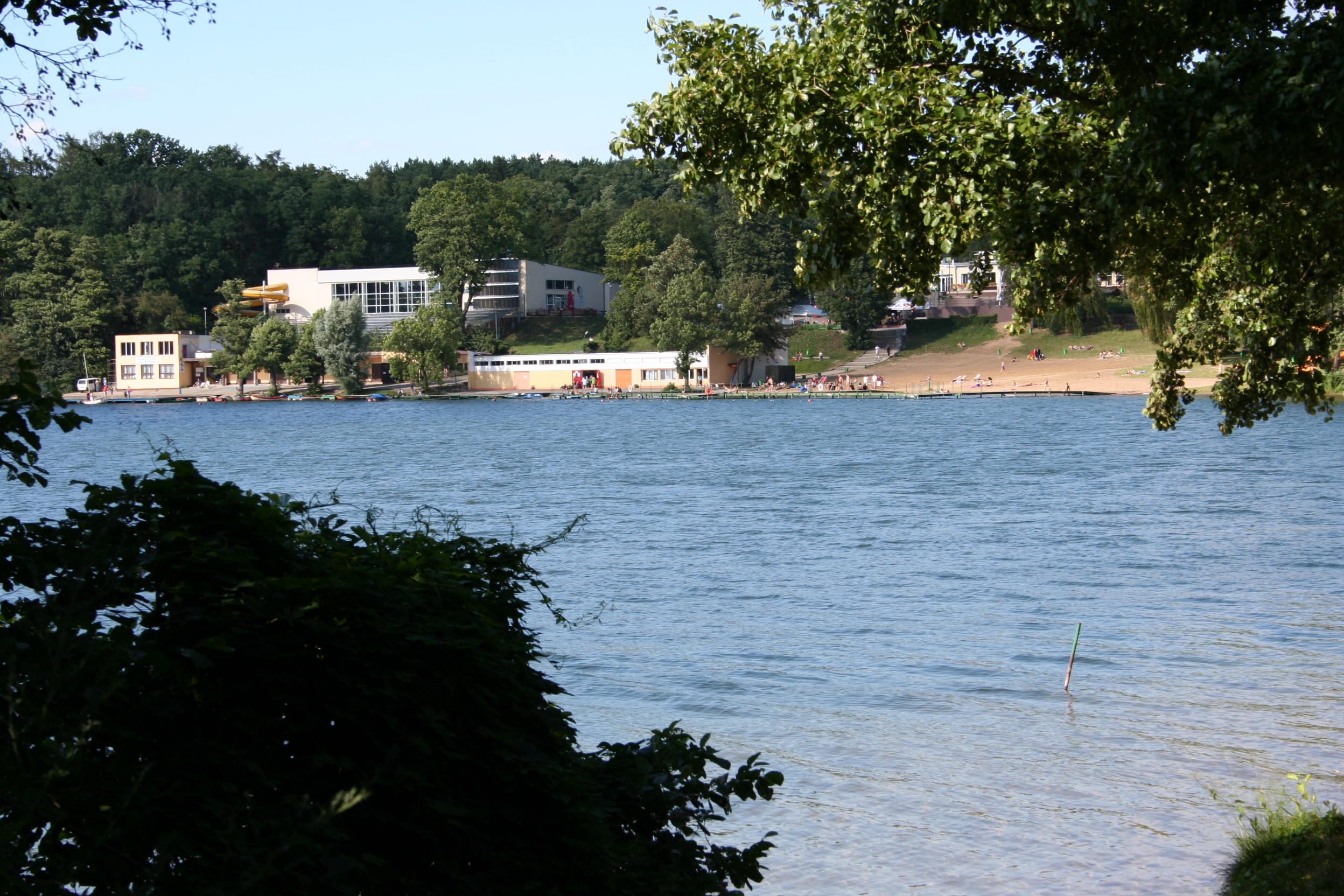
Jaroszewskie Lake

== See also ==
- Piotr Opaliński, Krzysztof Opaliński, Łukasz Opaliński
