= Jan Tęczyński (1581–1637) =

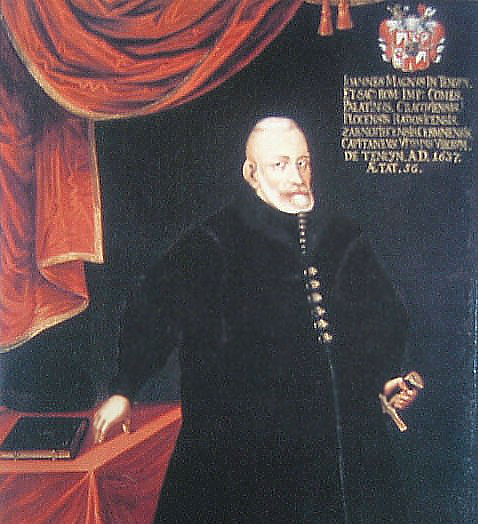
Jan Tęczyński

Jan Magnus Tęczyński (1579–1637), of the Topór coat-of-arms, was governor of Kraków (1620–37), Crown Cupbearer (czesnik koronny) from 1605-1620, starosta of Płock, and owner of Tenczyn and Rytwiany.

He was the son of Andrzej Tęczyński. In 1606 he married Dorota Mińska. As his three sons died young, he became the last of this line of the Tęczyński family.

In his youth Jan Tęczyński traveled throughout Europe and met Galileo. This experience led him to become a patron of the arts and sciences. He expanded the palace at Rytwiany, and his court was always open to writers and philosophers, such as Jan Andrzej Morsztyn, one of the most celebrated poets of the Polish Baroque. Piotr Kochanowski dedicated to Tęczyński his translation of Torquato Tasso's Jerusalem Delivered. Tęczyński was a patron of Jan Brożek, professor at the Kraków Academy. Tęczyński himself was also a writer.

Much of his wealth was inherited by his daughter Izabela, who married Łukasz Opaliński. After Opaliński's death, Izabela lived on the estate, which was divided between her sons Jan and Stanisław after her death in 1667.

== See also ==
- House of Tęczyński
