= Piotr Opaliński =

Polish-Lithuanian noble

- Born: 1586
- Died: 17 January 1624 (aged 37–38)
- Spouse: Zofia Kostka
- Children: Krzysztof Opaliński; Łukasz Opaliński; Anna Beata Opalińska; Franciszka Opalińska; Zofia Opalińska
- Parent(s): Jan Opaliński; Barbara z Ostroroga Lwowska
- Relatives: Jan Opaliński (brother; d. 1637); Anna Opalińska (sister; d. 1595); Zofia Opalińska (sister; d. 1598)

Piotr Opaliński (1586– 17 January 1624), of Łodzia coat of arms, was a Polish–Lithuanian noble (szlachcic). Kasztelan poznański since 1620, wojewoda poznański since 1622, starosta pobiedzki i śremski (since 1611).

The son of Jan Opaliński and Barbara z Ostroroga Lwowska, he studied in a Jesuit collegium in Poznań, later in Ingolstadt and Padua (around 1604). After visiting Rome, returned to Polish–Lithuanian Commonwealth in 1605 and took part in the Sejm of 1606. In 1607 married Zofia Kostka (also known as Zofia Kostanka), daughter of Krzysztof Kostka and Anna Pilecka. In 1616 took part in the diplomatic mission to Muscovy and later in the last stage of the Polish–Muscovite War (1605–1618). Afterwards he took part in the battle of Chocim in 1621.

His older brother Jan Opaliński, also voivode of Poznań, who outlived him, was considered to be the head of Opaliński family after their father death.

His total wealth near the end of his life was 3 towns and 50 villages. In 1619 he sponsored the monastery and Bernardian church in Sieraków. He died on 17 January 1624 and his tomb remains in that church.

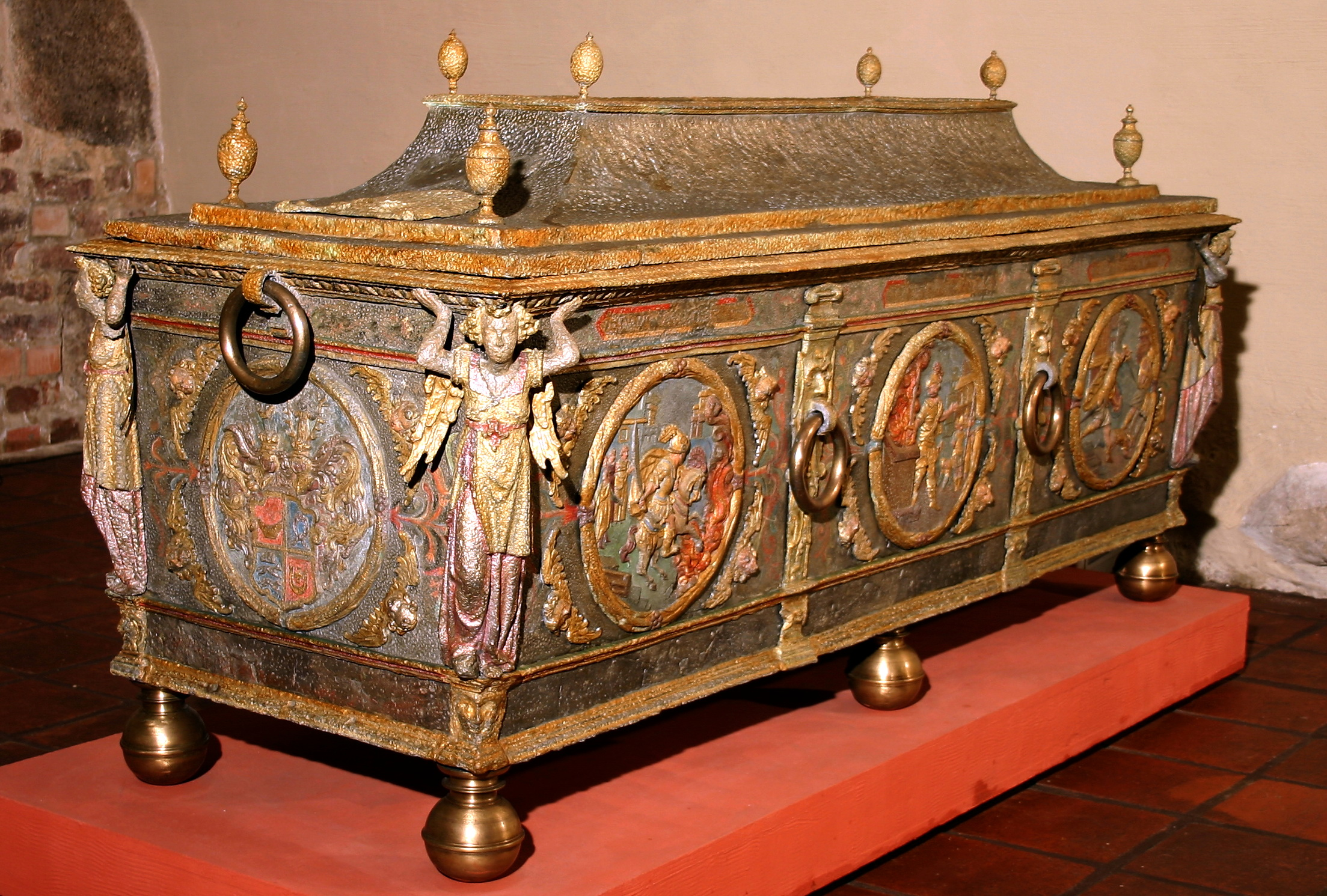
Piotr Opalinski sarcophagus in Sieraków

He is one of the figures on the Prussian Homage painting by Jan Matejko.

Father of:

- Krzysztof Opaliński
- Łukasz Opaliński
- Anna Opalińska
- Franciszka Opalińska
- Zofia Opalińska
