= Białężyce =

- Village
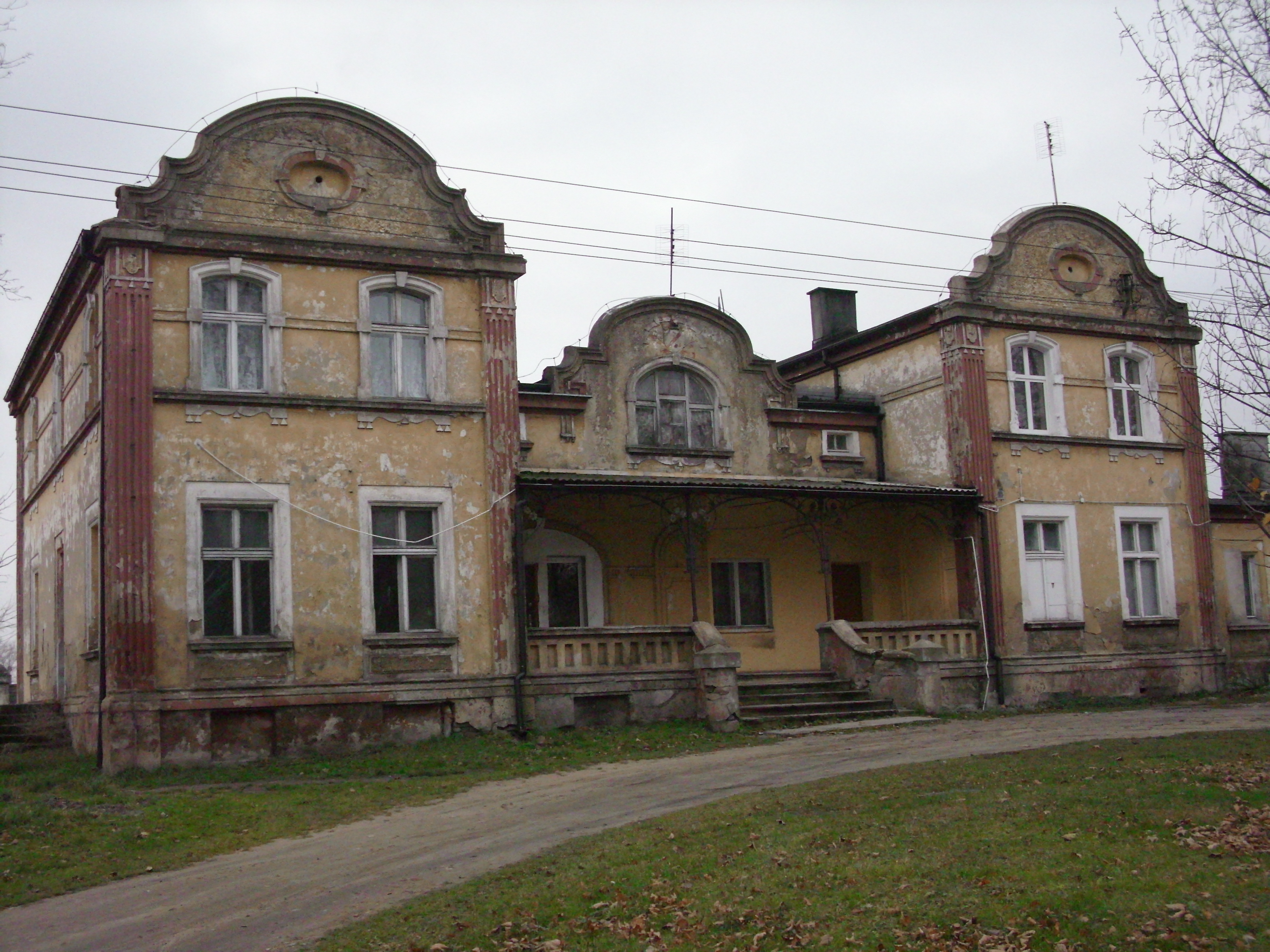

- Location within Poland
- Coordinates: 52°18′28″N 17°32′4″E
- Country: Poland
- Voivodeship: Greater Poland
- County: Września
- Gmina: Września
- Population: 360

Białężyce [bjawɛ̃ˈʐɨt͡sɛ] is a village in the administrative district of Gmina Września, within Września County, Greater Poland Voivodeship, in west-central Poland.
