= Jan Opaliński (died 1637) =

Polish noble

Jan Opaliński (1581–1637) of the Łodzia coat of arms, son of Jan Opaliński (1546–1598) and Barbara z Ostroroga Lwowska, brother of Piotr Opaliński, was the head of Opaliński family in the 17th century. He served as Voivode of Poznań since 1628, castellan of Kalisz since 1624, starost of Inowrocław, pious Catholic and supporter of the Society of Jesus, he gathered much wealth.
