= Tęczyński =

Polish noble family

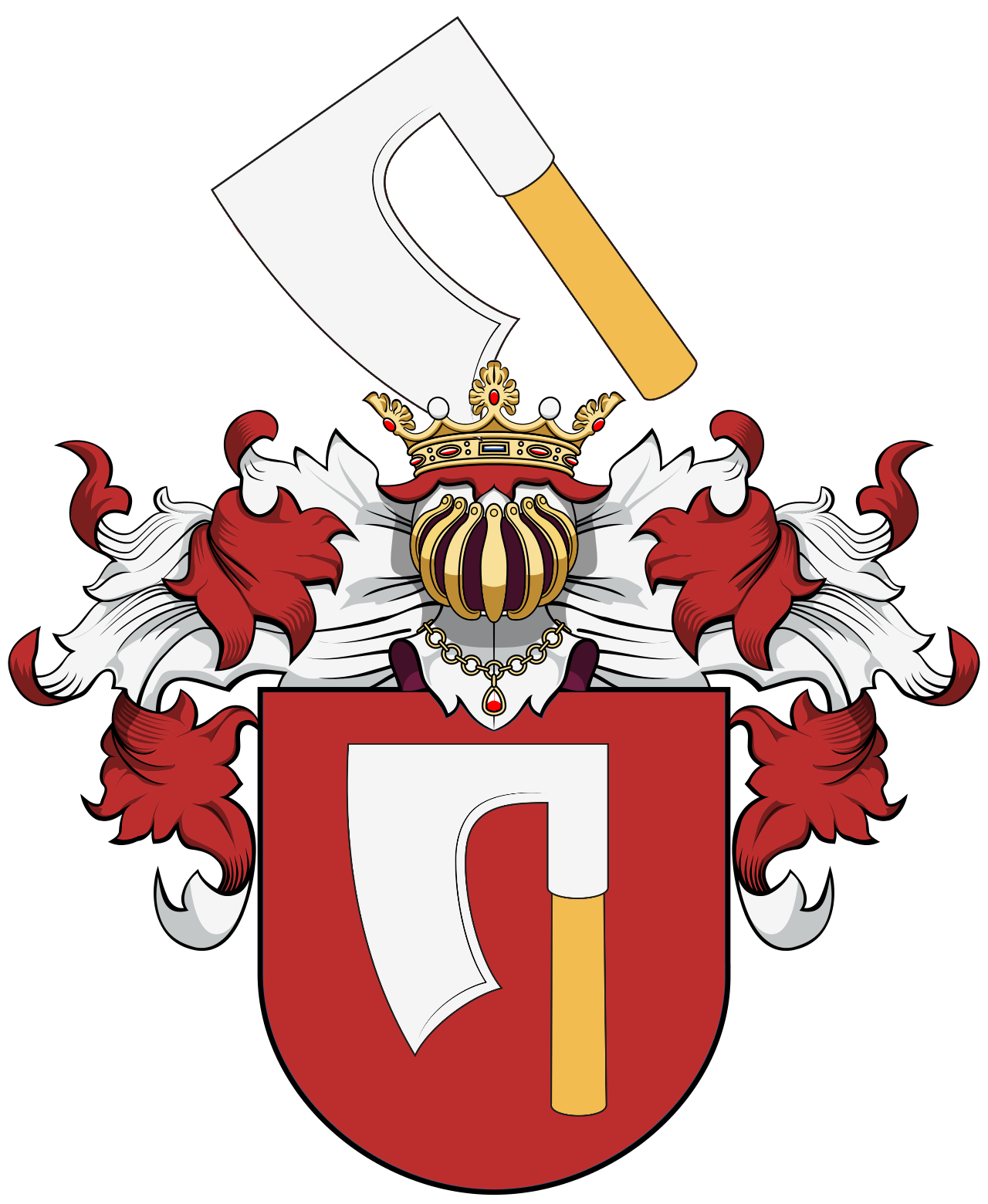
Topór coat of arms used by the Tęczyński family

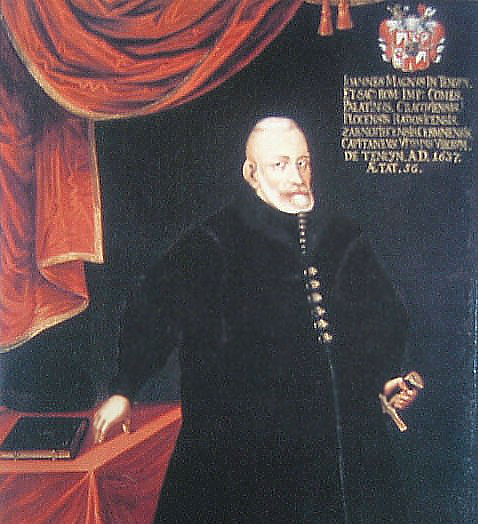
Jan Magnus Tęczyński, last of the Tęczyński family

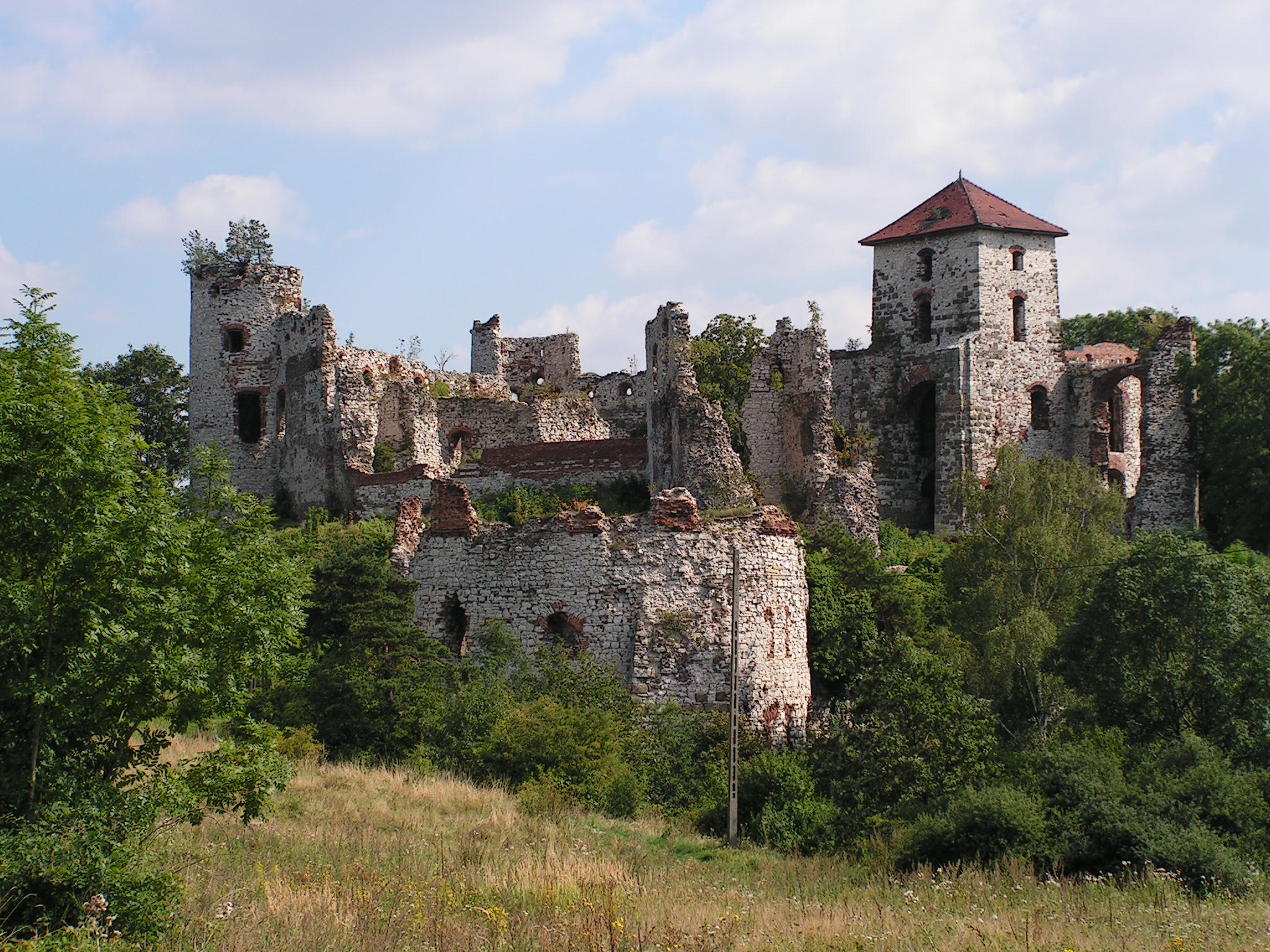
Ruins of Tęczyn Castle in Rudno

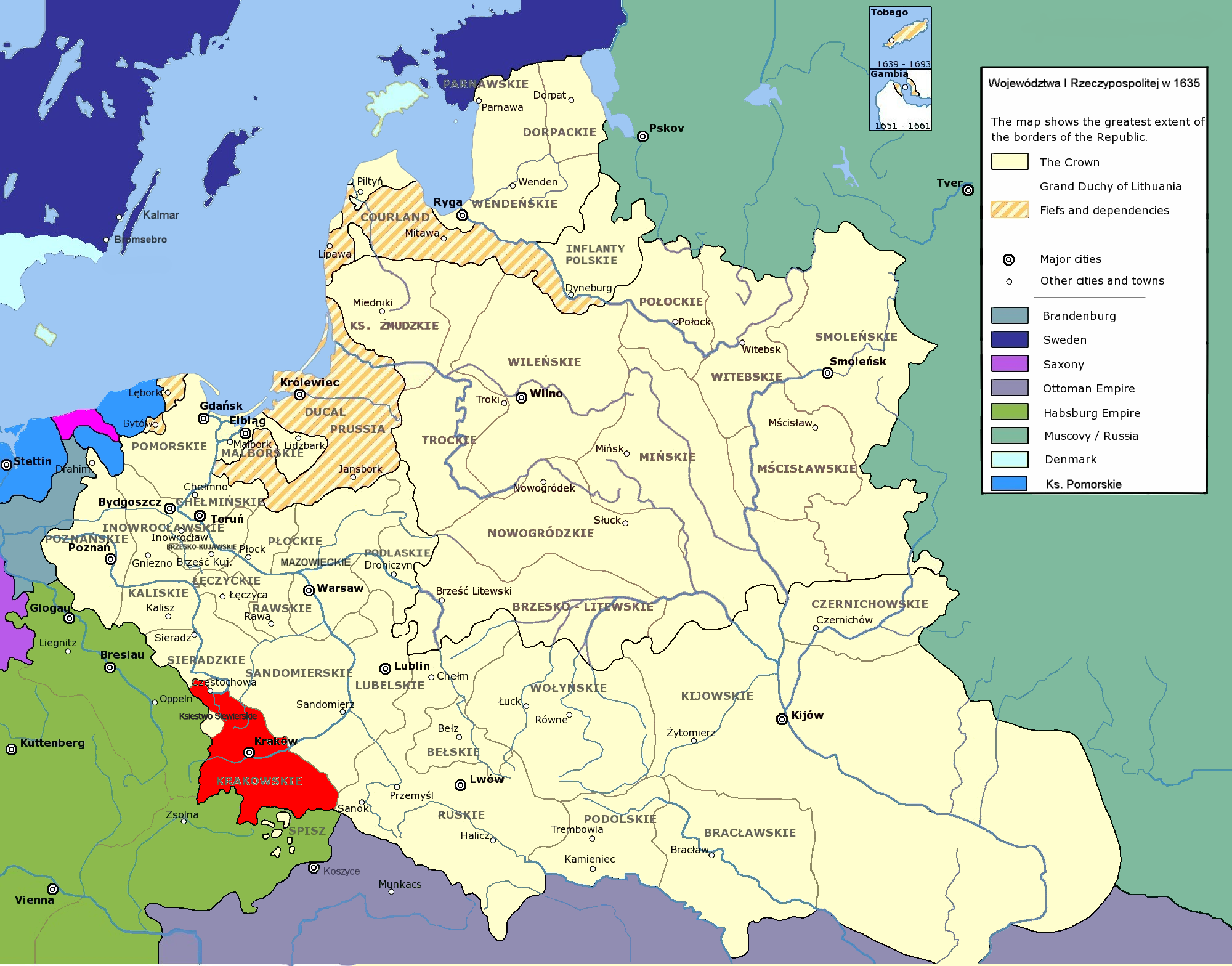
Kraków Voivodeship in the Polish–Lithuanian Commonwealth - lands heavily dominated by the Tęczyński family

The House of Tęczyński was a powerful family of nobility (szlachta) in the Kingdom of Poland, during the times of the late Piast dynasty, the Jagiellon dynasty and in the early decades of the Polish–Lithuanian Commonwealth (from 14th century to early 17th century). They were an important family from Lesser Poland (Małopolska), active in Polish politics of their time.

== Family's history and importance ==
According to a legend, the family traced its origins to the 12th century magnate, Sieciech, or even to some older individuals, rumored to be powerful "princes" before Mieszko I created the Polish state. According to historians, the first verifiable member of the Tęczyński family was Nawój z Morawicy (d. 1331), castellan of Kraków, who laid the foundations of his family greatness. They used the Topór coat of arms. His son Andrzej Tęczyński (d. 1369), voivode of Kraków, begun the construction of the family's castle, continued by his descendants. Jan Tęczyński (d. 1405), starost and castellan of Kraków, was also one of the most important advisers to the first King of Poland of the Jagiellon dynasty, Władysław Jagiełło. Jan Tęczyński (d. 1470), castellan of Kraków, voivode of Kraków and Lublin, was recognized as one of the two most important Polish magnates of his time (the other one was cardinal Zbigniew Oleśnicki. Andrzej Tęczyński (d. 1536), castellan of Kraków, voivode of Kraków, Lublin and Sandomierz, in 1527 received a hereditary title of a count from the Holy Roman Emperor.

The family had numerous possessions, most of them in the Lesser Poland, Kraków Voivodeship (including a large latifundia near Kraków). Its members often held the posts of castellan of Kraków and voivode of Kraków. The family, recognized during the 14th to mid-17th centuries as one of the most important in Lesser Poland, lost influence after the death of its last male member, Jan Magnus Tęczyński in 1637.

The family seat was the Tenczyn Castle (also known as Tęczyn Castle), now a ruin in the village of Rudno. The castle would fall in ruin after being pillaged by the Swedes, looking for rumored treasures of the Tęczyński family, during The Deluge in the mid-17th century. Subsequently, rebuilt, after a fire in mid-18th century it was never rebuilt again.

Polish poet Jan Kochanowski wrote a poem Pamiątka Tęczyńskiemu [A memory for Tęczyński]. Polish writer Józef Ignacy Kraszewski dedicated one of his works to the family: Tęczyńscy: dramat historyczny w pięciu aktach prozą [Tęczyńscy: a historical drama in five acts in prose] (1844).

== Notable members ==
- Nawój z Morawicy (d. 1331), castellan of Kraków
- Andrzej Tęczyński (d. 1369), voivode of Kraków
- Jan Tęczyński (d. 1405), starost and castellan of Kraków, close advisor of Władysław II Jagiełło
- Andrzej Tęczyński (d. 1461)
- Jan Tęczyński (d. 1470), castellan of Kraków, voivode of Kraków and Lublin
- Sędziwój Tęczyński (d. 1479), rector of the Cracow Academy
- Zbigniew Tęczyński (d. 1498), (d. 1470), adviser of Kazimierz IV Jagiellończyk
- Andrzej Tęczyński (d. 1536), castellan of Kraków, voivode of Kraków, Lublin and Sandomierz, HRE count
- Andrzej Tęczyński (d. 1561), voivode of Kraków and Lublin
- Jan Magnus Tęczyński (d. 1637), voivode of Kraków and Ruthenia
