= Sanguszko =

Polish-Lithuanian noble family

- Pogoń Litewska
- Current region: Poland, Ukraine
- Origin: Volhynia
- Connected families: Czartoryski

The House of Sanguszko (Note: Lithuanian: Sanguškos, Belarusian: Сангушка, Ukrainian: Санґушко) is a Polish and Lithuanian noble and aristocratic family of Lithuanian and Ruthenian origin, connected to the Gediminid dynasty. Like other princely houses of Polish–Lithuanian Commonwealth, its origins are considered murky. Present historical opinion holds in favour of their descent from Algirdas' grandson Alexander (fl. 1433–1443), lord of Kovel and Liuboml, whose name can be shortened to Sangush. The family supposedly descends from two lines, associated with two of his sons, Alexander and Michael.

The senior line, called the Sanguszko-Koszyrski, has been extinct since the death of Adam Aleksander Sanguszko in 1653. The junior line, or the Sanguszko-Kowelski, of Szymon Samuel Sanguszko, subsequently assumed the title Sanguszko-Lubartowicz, according to the erroneous assumption of their descent from Algirdas' younger brother Liubartas.

Prince Paweł Karol Sanguszko (1680–1750), a Court and Grand Marshal of Lithuania, greatly expanded his holdings through his second marriage with Marianna Lubomirska, heiress of Ostroh. His chief residence at Iziaslav (now in Ukraine) was embellished with a famous collection of Persian carpets, known as Sanguszko carpets. Hieronymous Sanguszko (1743–1812) founded the Volhynia stud, establishing the family as breeders of Arabian horses.

After the partitions of Poland, Eustachy Erazm Sanguszko fought in the Kościuszko Uprising and Napoleon's Russian campaign. His son, Prince Roman Sanguszko, was a Polish officer who participated in the November Uprising, and was exiled to Siberia. His life is the subject of "Prince Roman" (1910) one of Joseph Conrad's short stories. With the incorporation of Galicia into Soviet Ukraine after World War II, the Sanguszkos lost their Gumniska and Sławuta estates, as well as their palace in Lviv, and emigrated to Brazil.

By the late 20th century, the family was represented by a single descendant, Prince Paul (born 1973), who resides in São Paulo. His mother came from the Polignac lineage. In 2010 Olympia Sanguszko was born to Prince Paul and his wife.

== Lineages ==
- koszyrsko-niesuchoiżska (Kamień Koszyrski-Niesuchojeże line) – split into two primary lineages:
  - gałąź koszyrska – Sanguszkowie-Koszyrscy (Kamień Koszyrski branch) – the male branch died out in 1653; descendants in the female line still exist today in Kiev;
  - gałąź niesuchoiżska – Sanguszkowie-Niesuchoiżscy (Niesuchojeże branch) – the branch died out in 1591;
- linia kowelska – Sanguszkowie-Kowelscy (Kowel line) – existing until today.

== Notable members ==
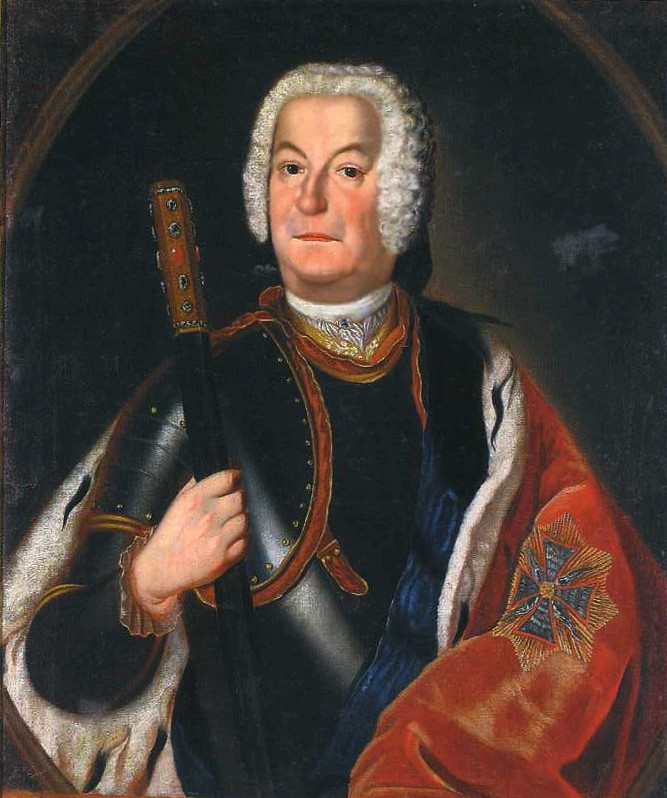
Paweł Karol Sanguszko

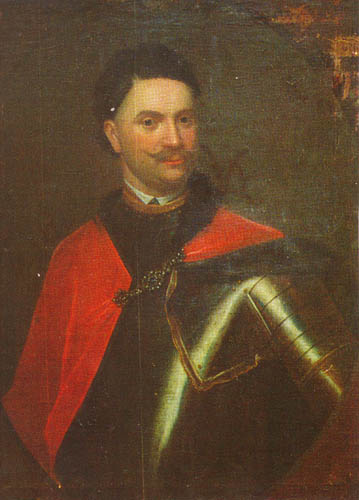
Dymitr Sanguszko

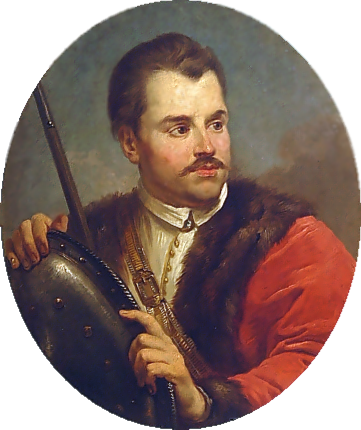
Roman Sanguszko

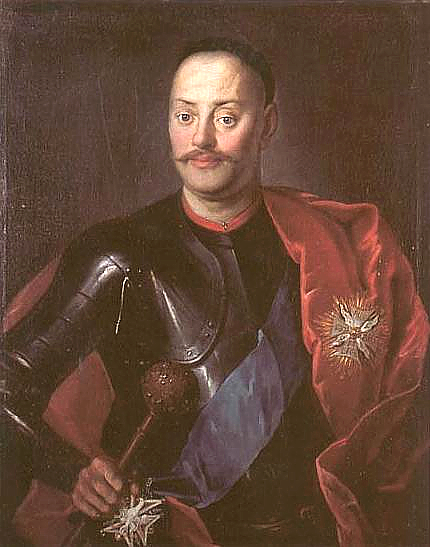
Janusz Sanguszko

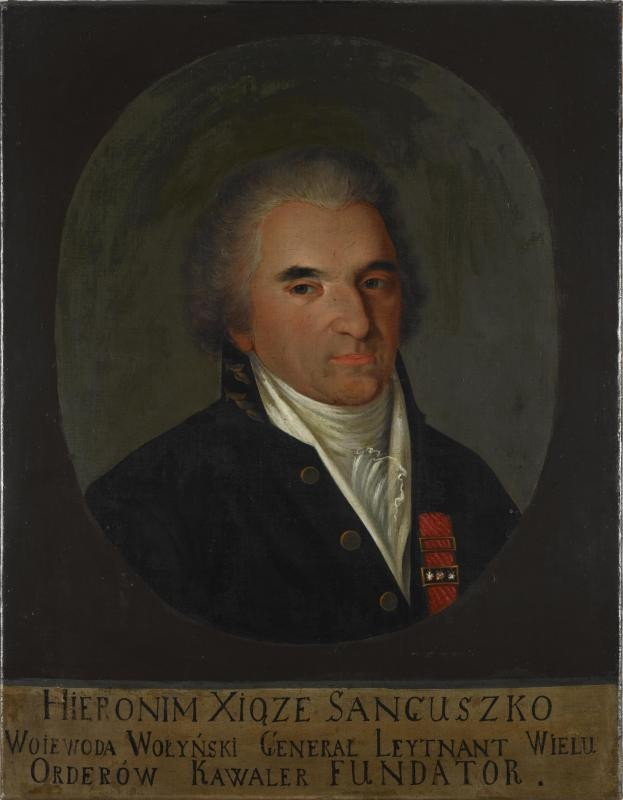
Hieronim Sanguszko

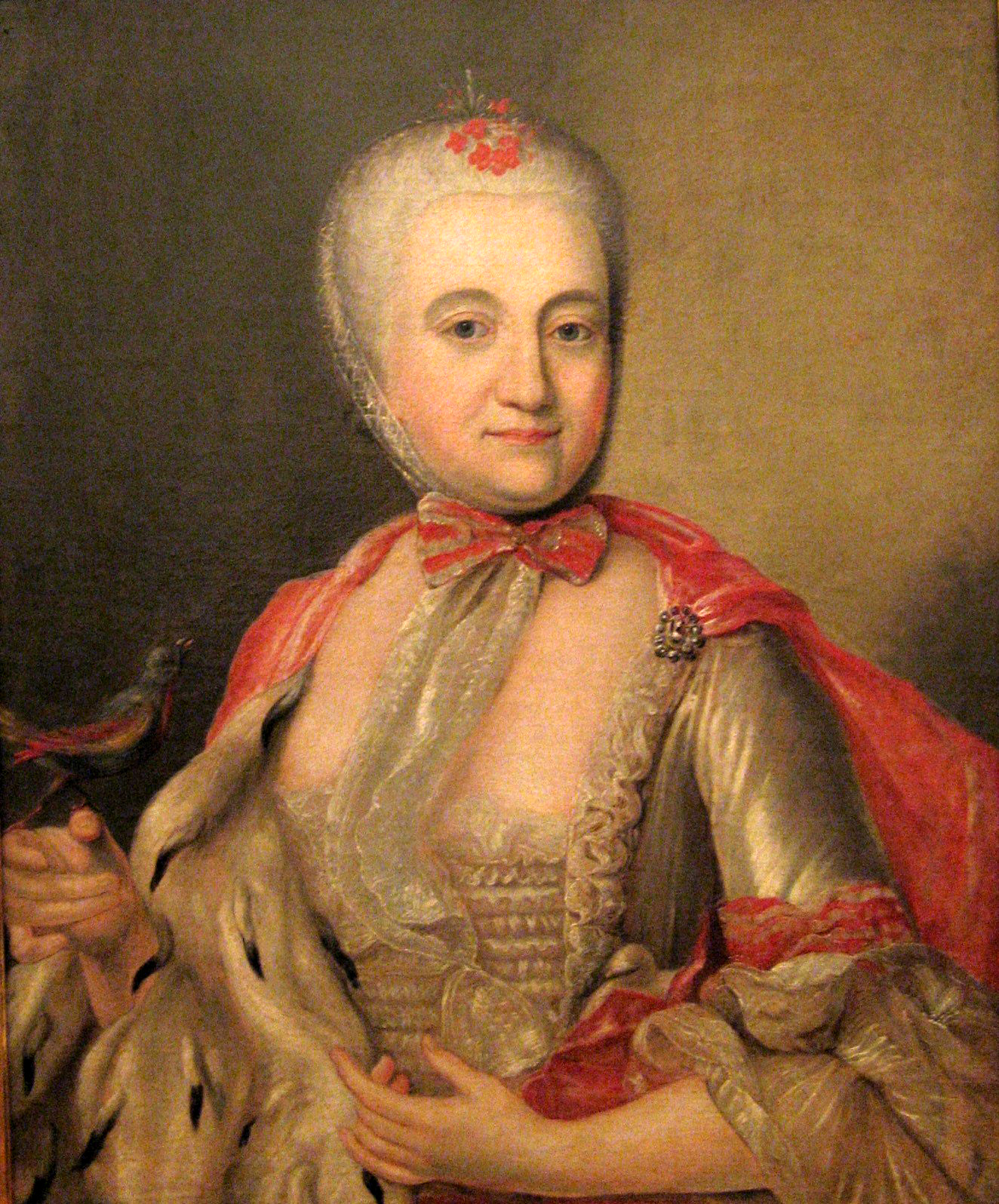
Barbara Sanguszko née Dunin

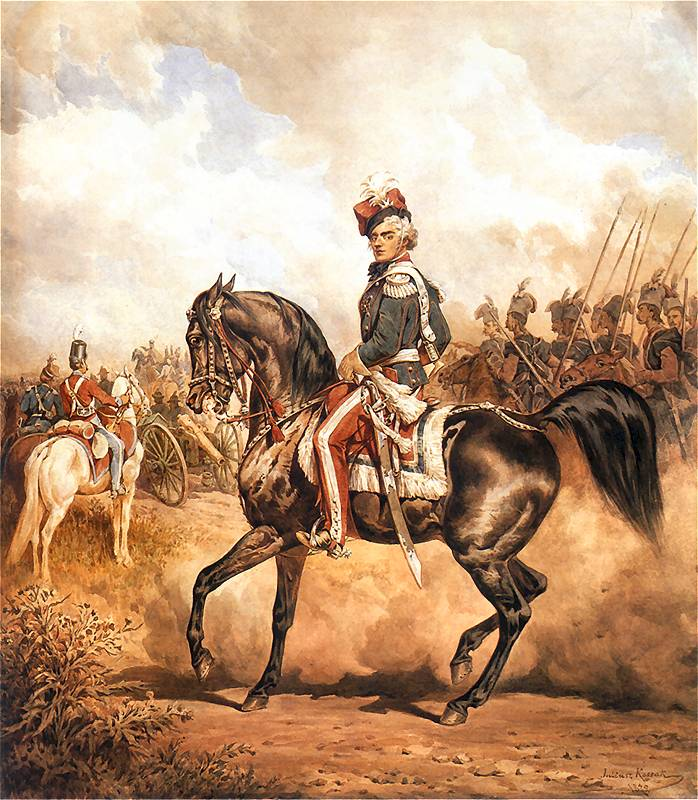
Eustachy Erazm Sanguszko

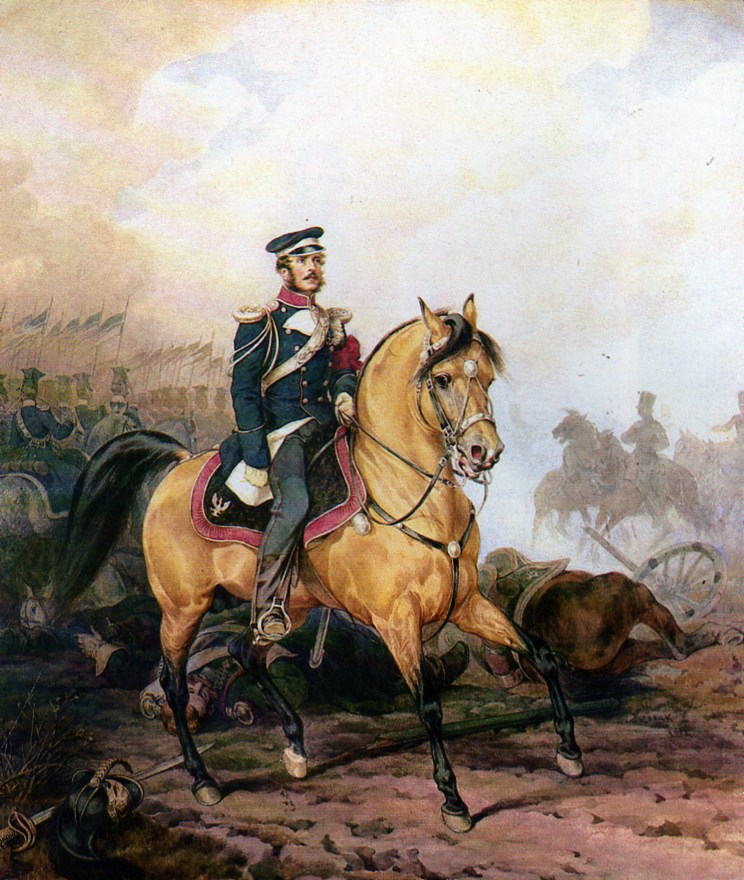
Władysław Hieronim Sanguszko

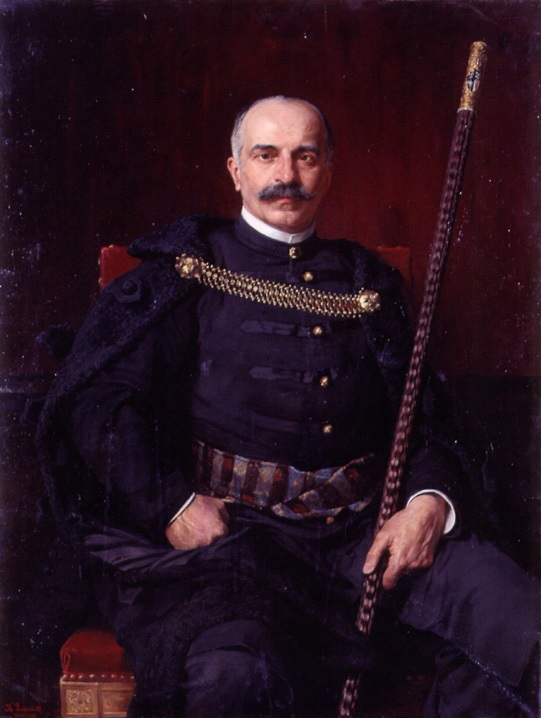
Eustachy Stanisław Sanguszko

- Andrzej Aleksandrowicz Sanguszko (died c. 1534/5), starost of Włodzimierz
- Roman Sanguszko (c. 1537–1571), voivode of Bracław, Field Hetman of Lithuania
- Samuel Szymon Sanguszko (died 1638), voivode of Witebsk, writer. He converted to Catholicism.
- Adam Aleksander Sanguszko (c. 1590–1653), voivode of Wołyń, the last member of the Sanguszko Kamień Koszyrski branch
- Anna Katarzyna Radziwiłłowa (1676–1746)
- Paweł Karol Sanguszko (1680-1750) son of Hieronim Sanguszko, Grand Marshal of the Court and of Lithuania
- Barbara Urszula Sanguszkowa (1718–1791), poet, translator, philanthropist, wife of Paweł Karol
- Janusz Aleksander Sanguszko (1712–1775), miecznik, Court Marshal of Lithuania
- Tekla Teresa Lubienska (1767–1810), granddaughter of Barbara Urszula, playwright, poet and translator
- Eustachy Erazm Sanguszko (1768–1844), general, deputy and horse breeder
- Roman Stanisław Sanguszko (1800–1881), participated in the November Uprising in 1830, exiled to Siberia, subject of "Prince Roman" (1910), one of Joseph Conrad's short stories.
- Władysław Hieronim Sanguszko (1803–1870), conservative politician
- Eustachy Stanisław Sanguszko (1842–1903) marshal, namiestnik of Galicia

== Palaces ==
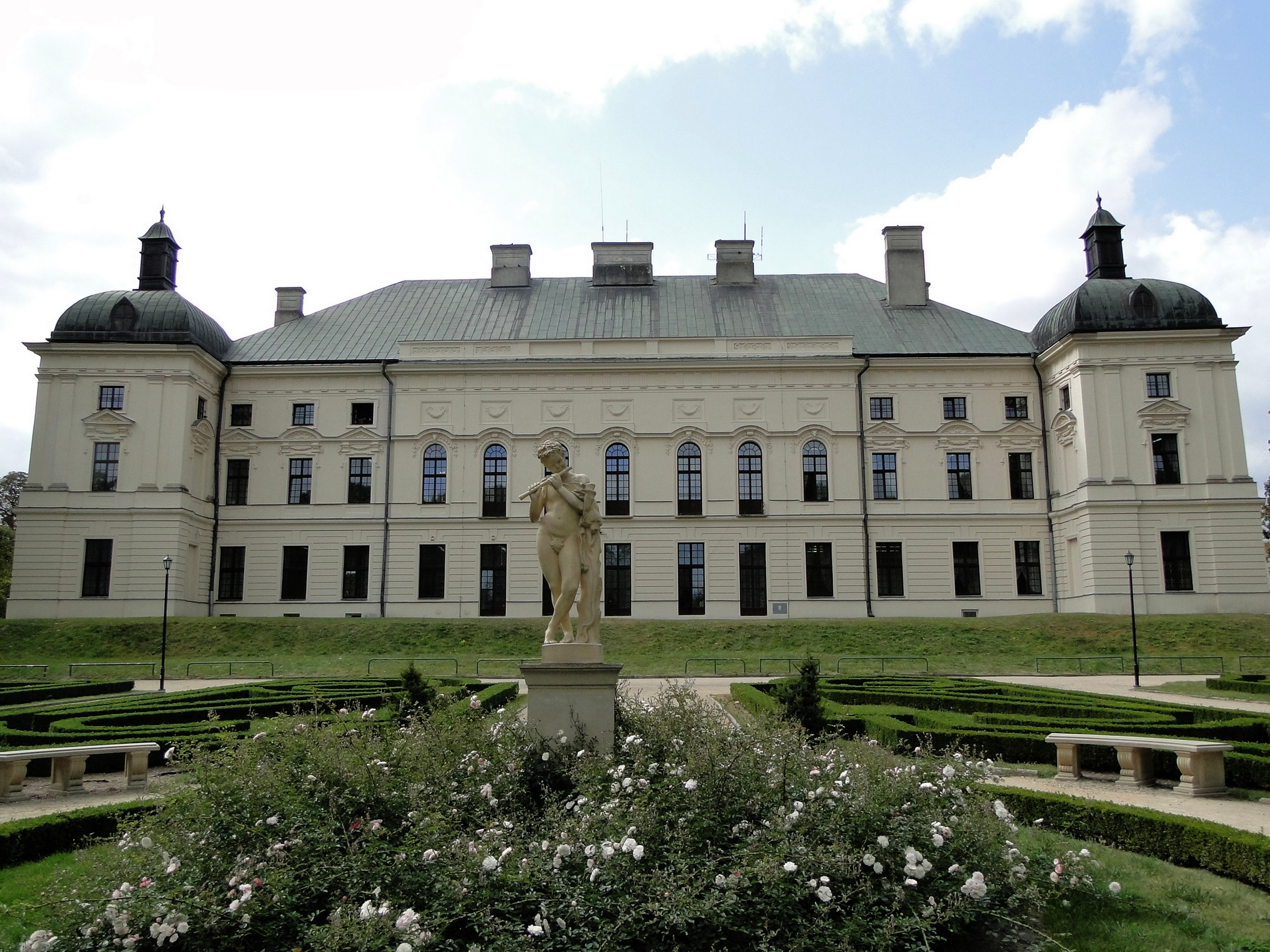
Palace in Lubartów

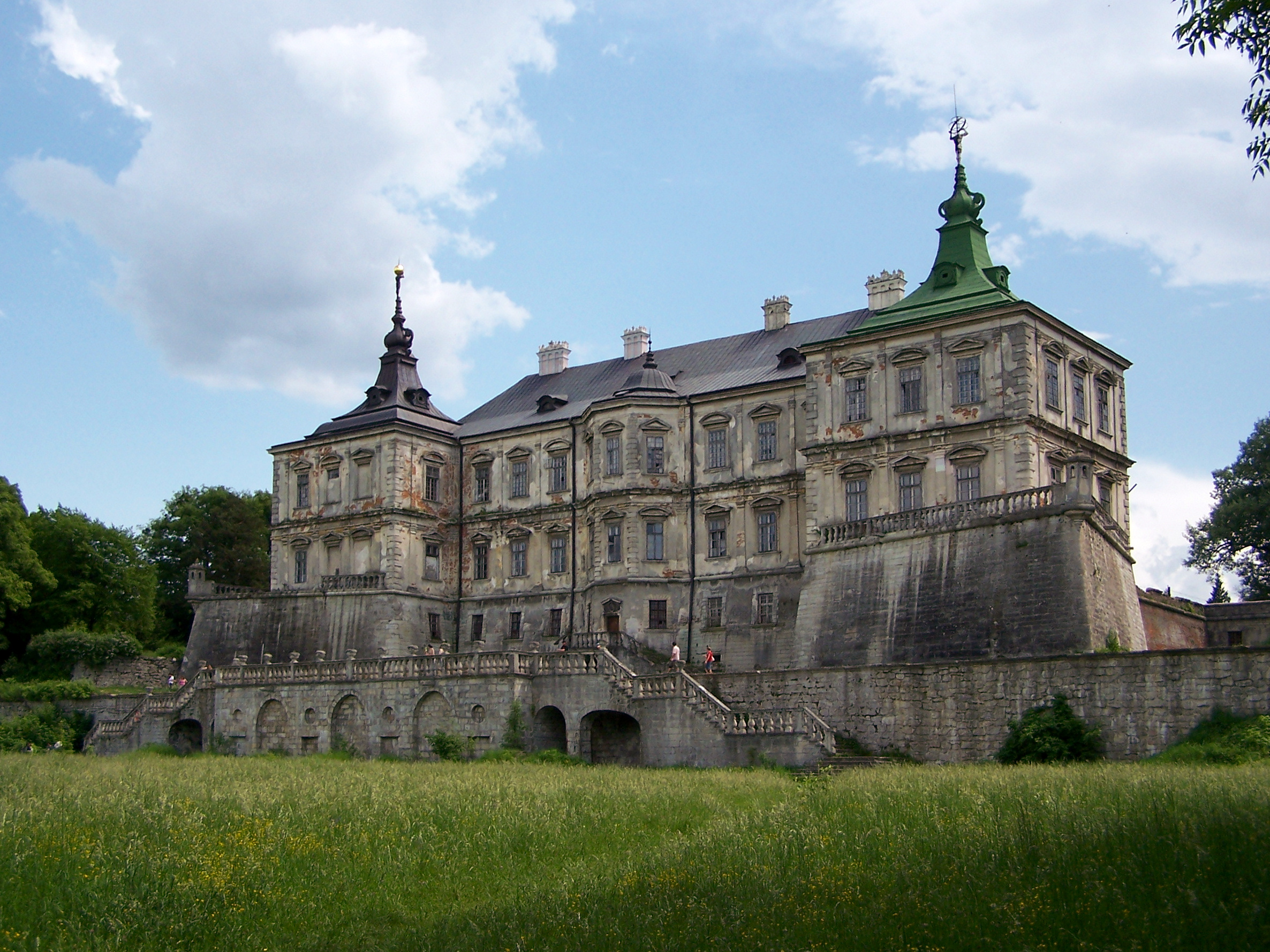
Castle in Pidhirtsi

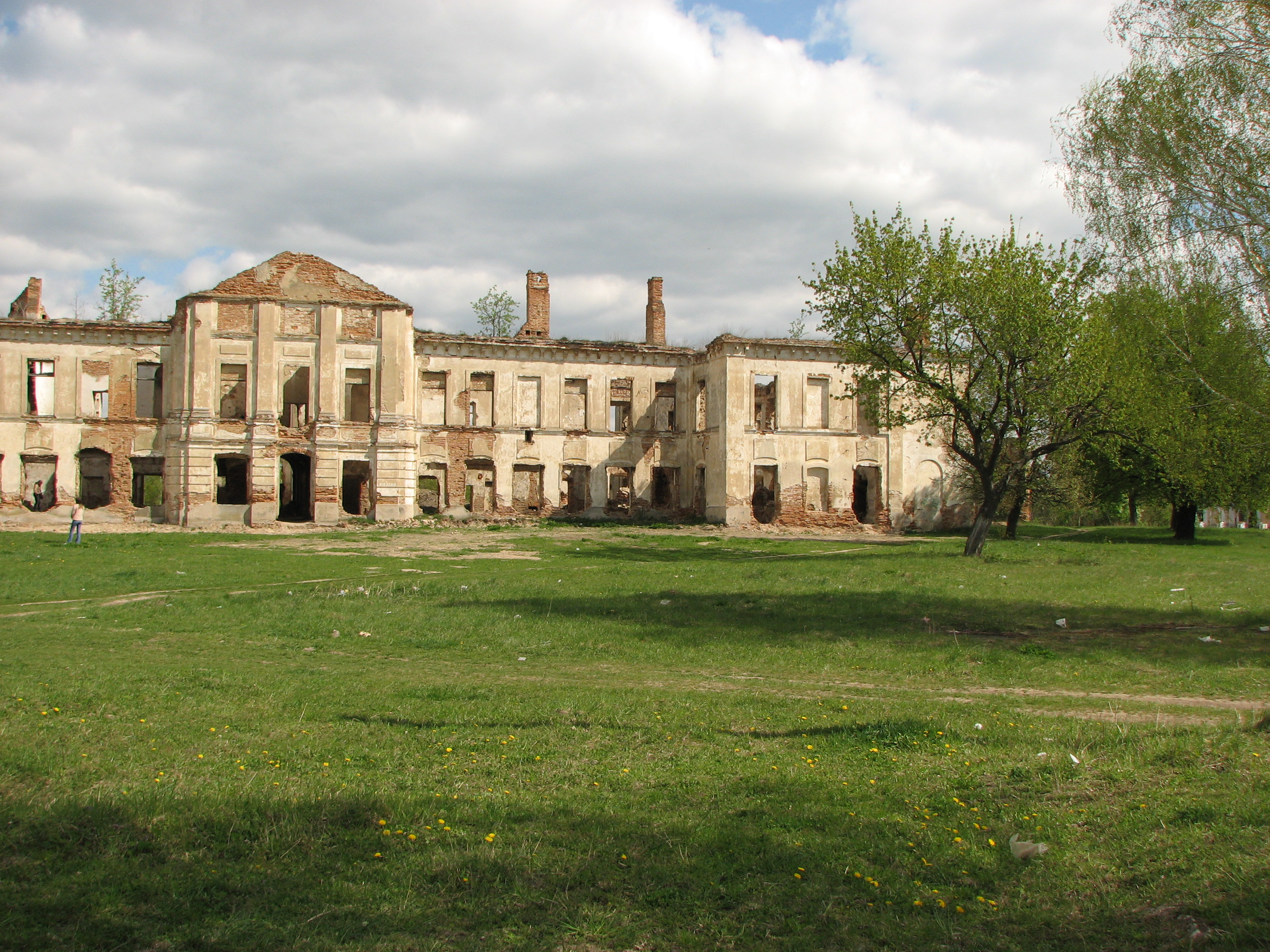
Palace in Iziaslav

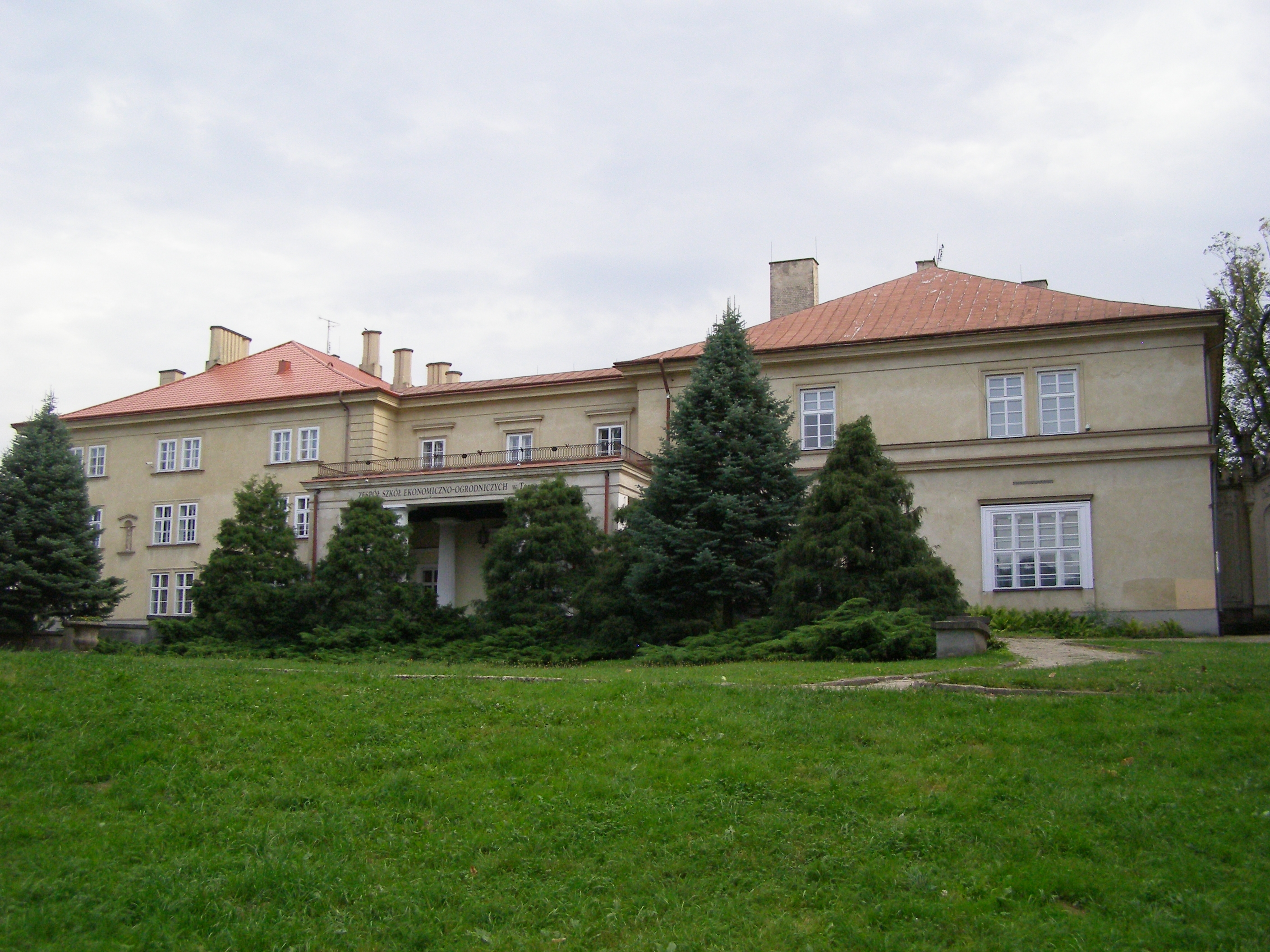
Palace in Gumniska

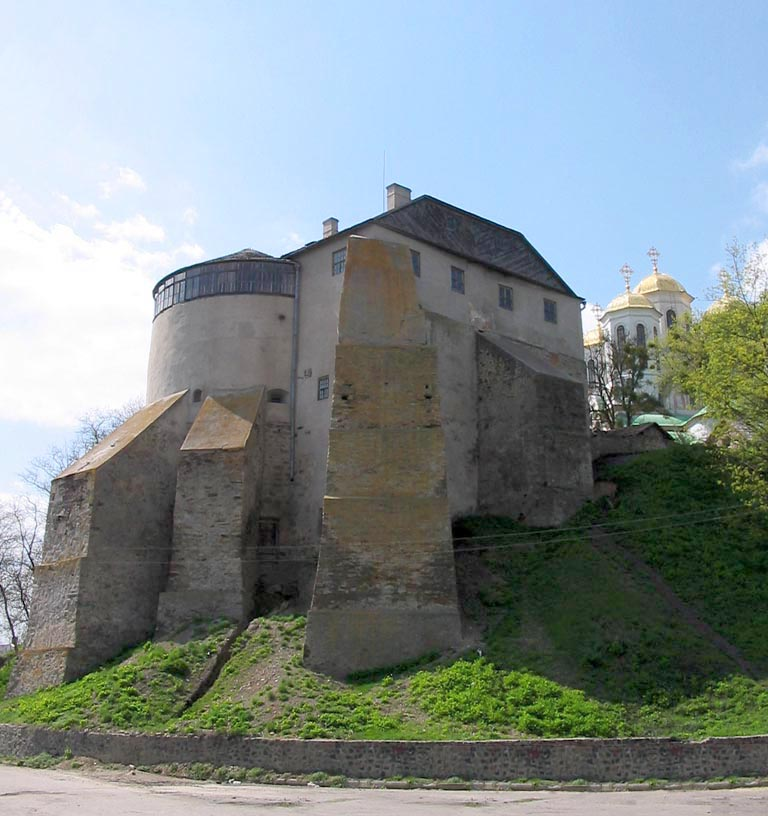
Castle in Ostroh

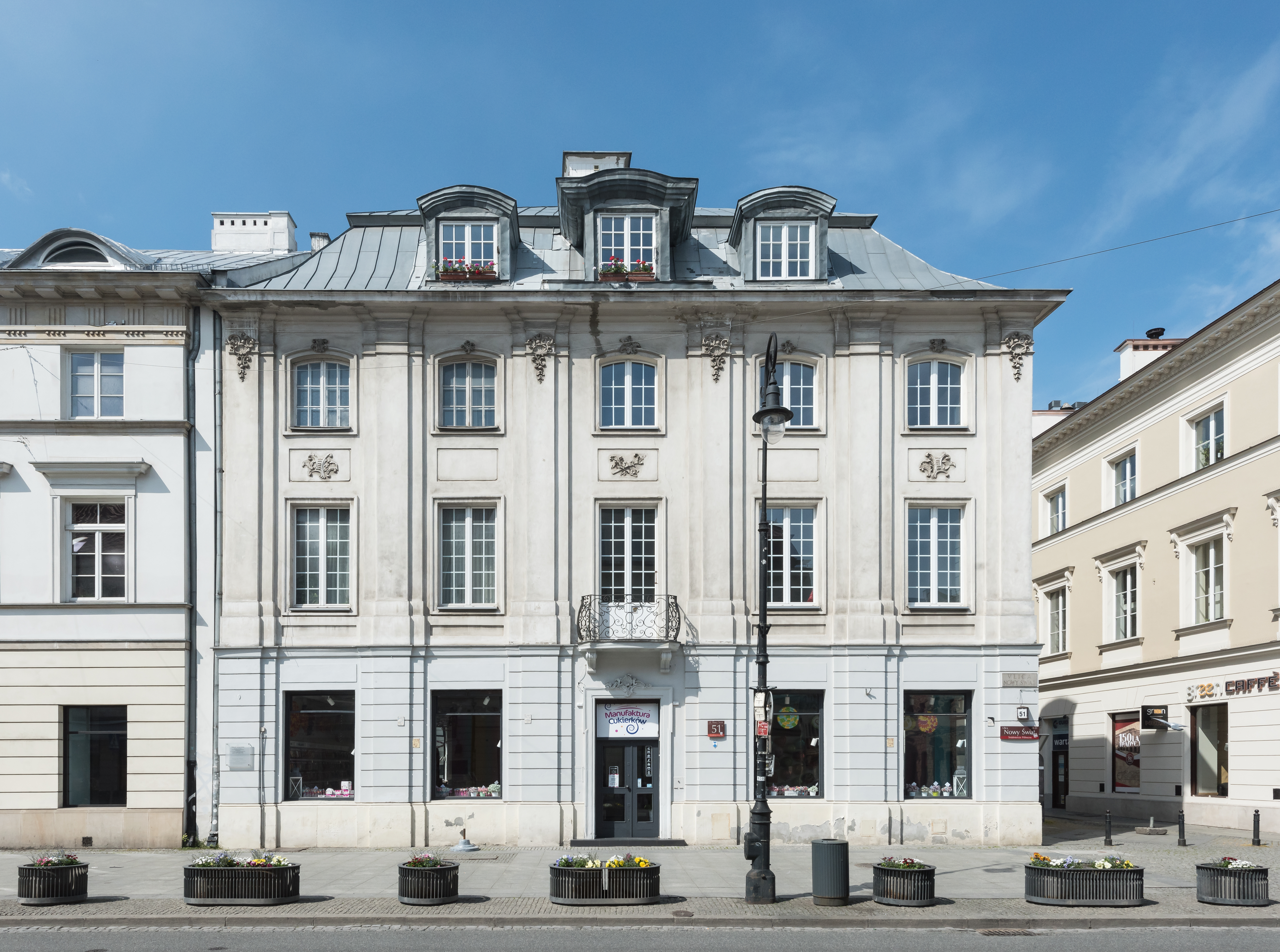
Palace of Hieronim Sanguszko in Warsaw

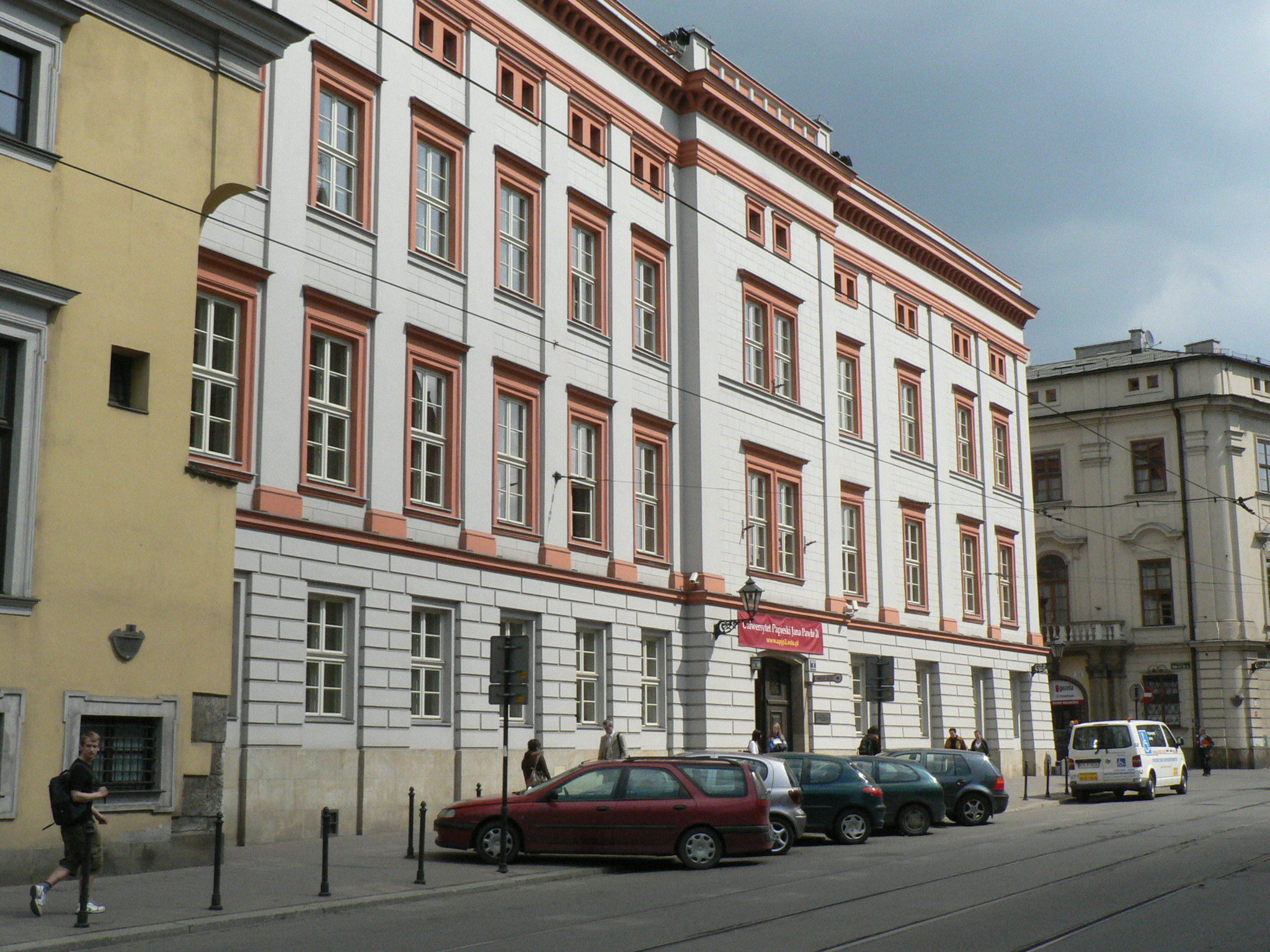
Sanguszko Palace in Kraków

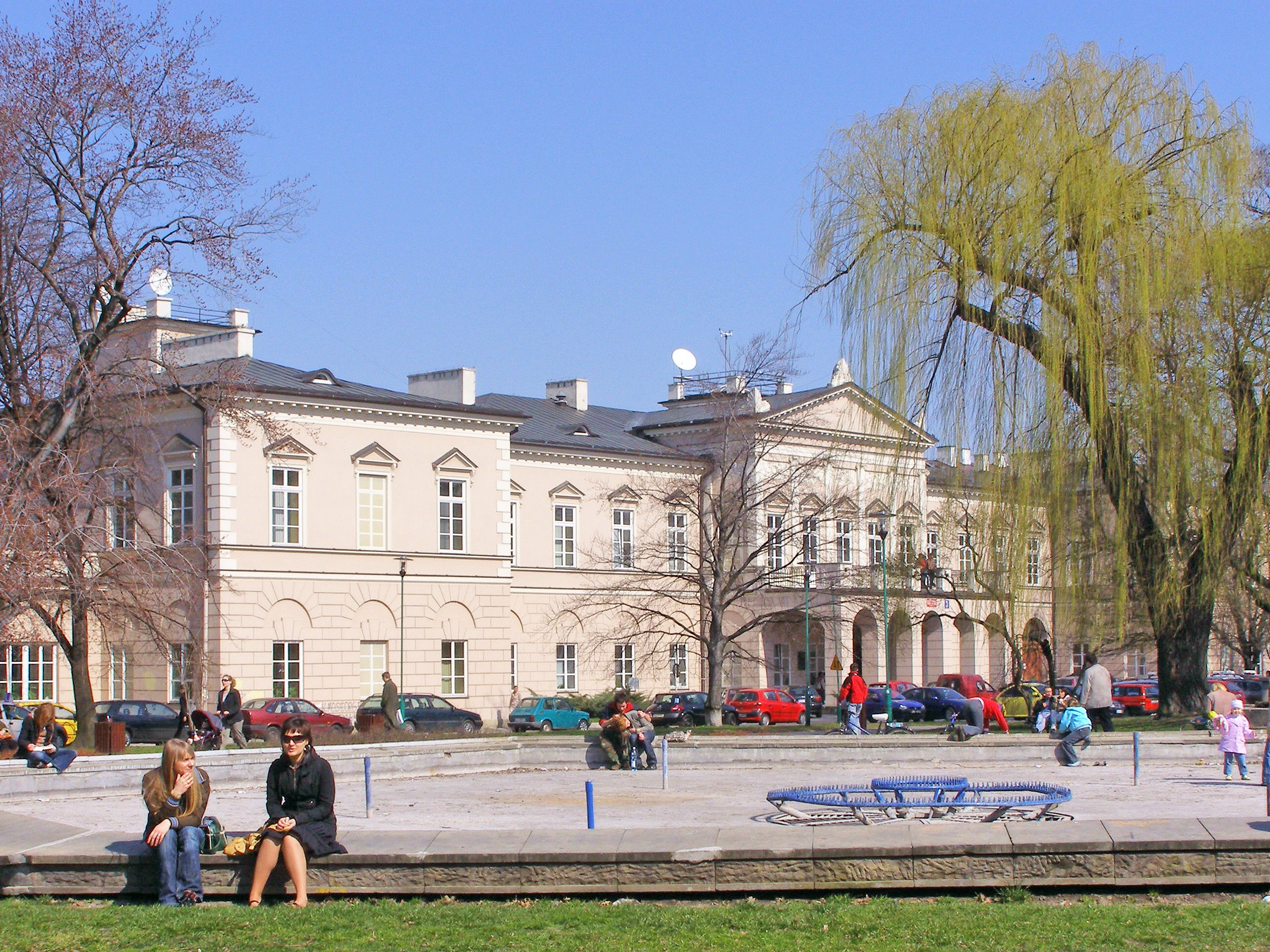
Lubomirski Palace in Lublin

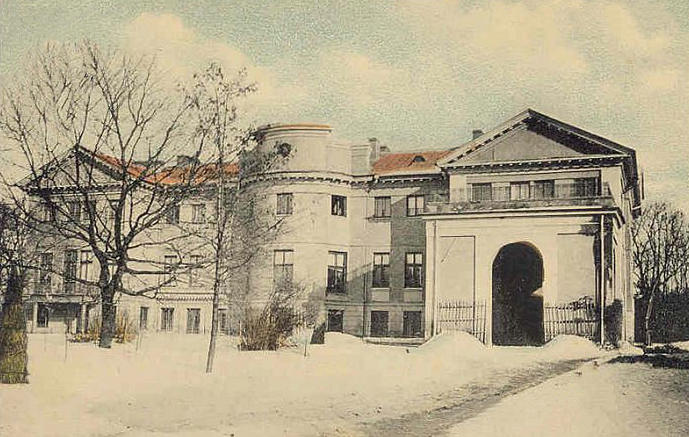
Palace in Slavuta

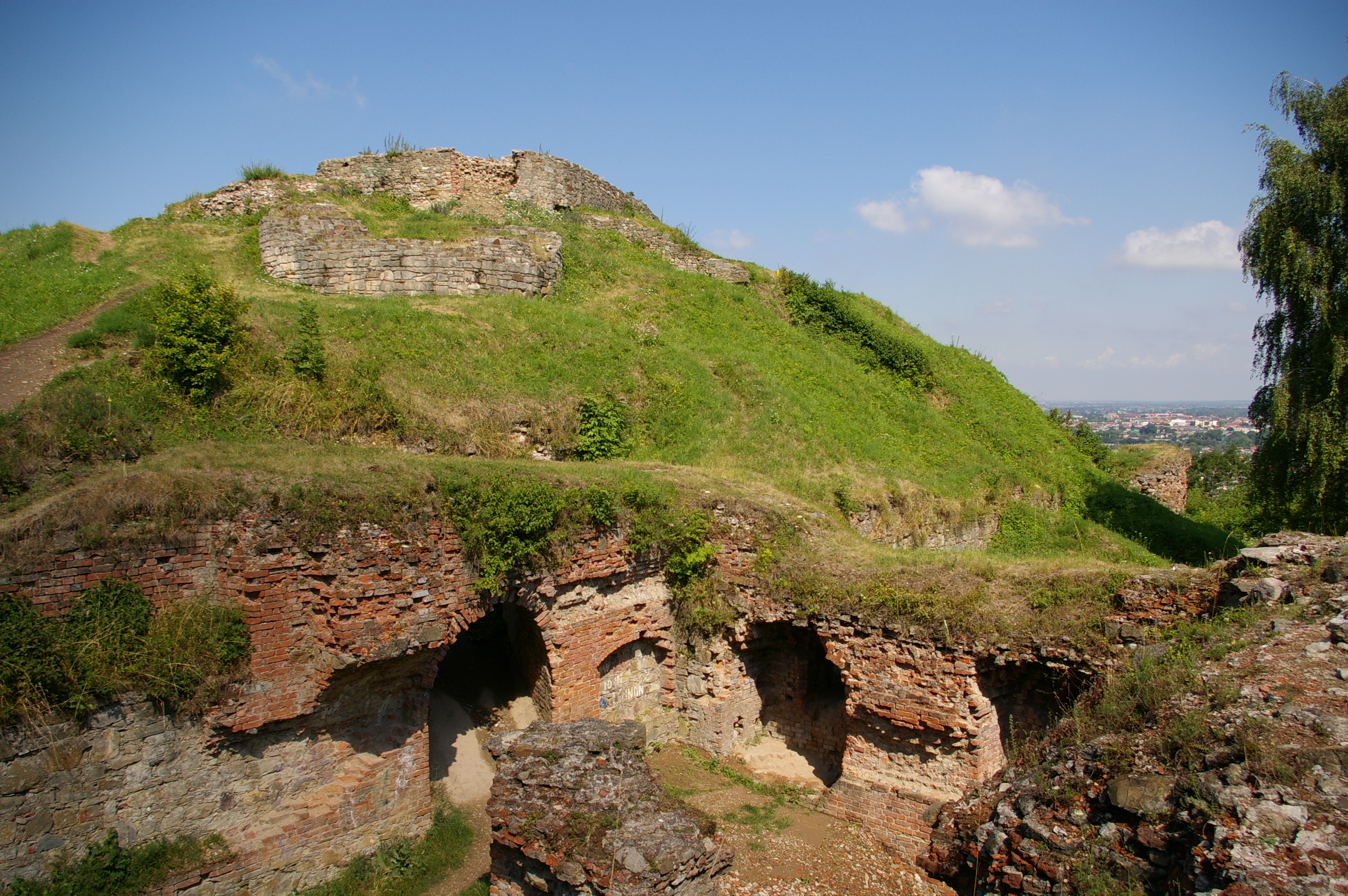
Ruins of a castle in Tarnów
