= Barbara Sanguszko =

Polish-Lithuanian poet, translator and philanthropist

Duchess Barbara Sanguszko
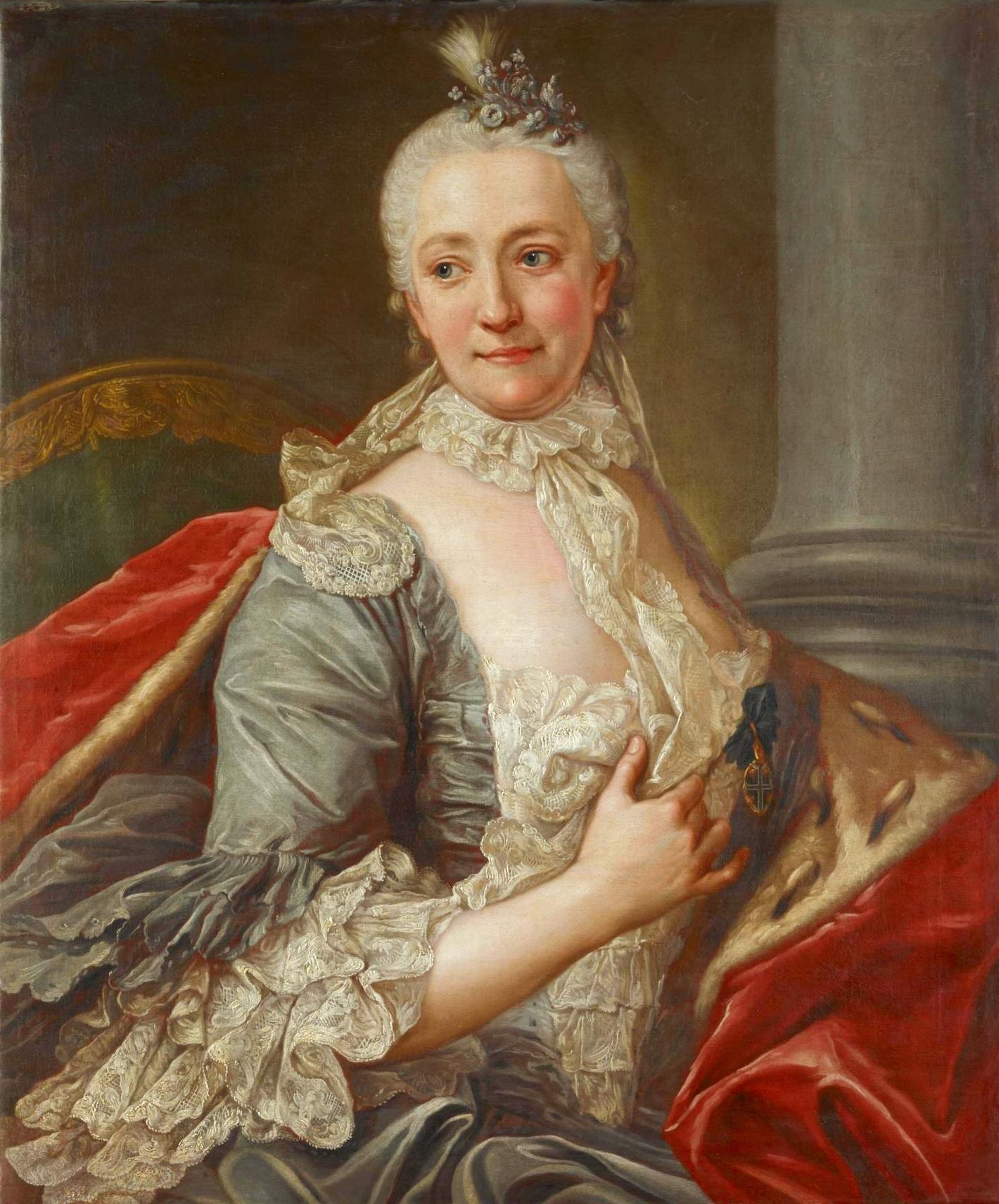
- oil by Marcello Bacciarelli
- Full name: Barbara Urszula Sanguszko
- Born: 4 February 1718; Warsaw, Poland
- Died: 15 February 1791 (aged 73); Warsaw, Poland
- Noble family: House of Sanguszko
- Spouse: Duke Paweł Karol Sanguszko (1680–1750)
- Issue: Anna; Józef Paulin Sanguszko; Krystyna Justyna; Hieronim Janusz; Kunegunda; Janusz Modest
- Father: Jakub Dunin
- Mother: Marianna Grudzińska

Arms of Pogoń Litewska

Barbara Urszula Sanguszko, née Dunin (pseudonym: A Dame; A definite Polish dame; definitely a worthy dowager; 4 February 1718 – 2 October 1791 in Warsaw) was a Polish noblewoman, poet, translator, and moralist during the Enlightenment in Poland. She organised and hosted a salon in Poddębice, where the gathering of intellectuals, artists and politicians was modelled after French 18th-century salons. Sanguszko was known for her piety and philanthropy. She was the third wife of the much older magnate and Grand Marshal of Lithuania, Duke Paweł Karol Sanguszko (1680–1750).

== Family ==
She was the daughter of Jakub Dunin (died 1730) and Marianna, née Grudzińska (died 1727). Orphaned early, she was brought up be her step-mother, Helena née Potocka (daughter of Jerzy Potocki). After home-tutoring she was married off in 1735 as the third wife of the much older Grand Marshal of Lithuania, Duke Paweł Karol Sanguszko (1682–1750). Of the ten children born to the couple, six survived. They included:

- Anna (1739–1766)
- Józef Paulin Sanguszko (1740–1781)
- Krystyna Justyna (1741–1778), wife of Franciszek Bieliński, together parents of Tekla Teresa Lubienska
- Hieronim Janusz (1743–1812)
- Kunegunda
- Janusz Modest (1749–1806)

== Society career ==
On 3 May 1745, she was awarded the Austrian Order of the Starry Cross. Five years later, on 15 April 1750 she was widowed. She took over the management of her late husband's affairs, especially the education of their children. That same year she procured the services of a French tutor, C. F. Pyrrhys de Varille, who remained on the estate in Lubartów, virtually continuously until her death. After her daughter Krystyna's marriage in 1763 to Francis Bieliński, she took up permanent residence in the Bielinski Palace in Warsaw. Following the premature death of her daughter, Krystyna, she took charge of her granddaughter, Tekla Teresa, whom she educated in the French manner. Every two years in the summer months she organised an élite Enlightenment salon in Poddębice attended by distinguished guests. Modelled on a French 18th-century salon, she hosted intellectuals, artists and politicians. Among her guests were Stanisław August Poniatowski, the future king, and Ignacy Krasicki. Together with Bona Granowska and her sister, Maria Lanckorońska, she formed 'the trinity of devout ladies' famed for their piety and philanthropy. Barbara Sanguszko was celebrated for her generosity. She not only restored many Catholic churches and convents, but laid the foundations of new religious houses, including Orthodox churches. At her instigation, Pope Pius VI granted indulgences by papal bull to four parishes.

Having in mind the future of her children and of the family estate, she took an active part in the political life of her country. She took it upon herself to attend parliaments and tribunals. Her soirées spawned the future theatrical initiatives of the Lazienki Palace. She hosted grand occasions in the Saski Palace, including illuminations, concerts and balls for dignitaries of the period. This ensured her attendance at the coronation of King Stanislas August. Apart from her real estate in Warsaw, she was mistress of estates in Szymanów, Zasław, Lubartów and Poddębice. She travelled widely across Poland to places including, Gdańsk, Białystok, Berdyczów, and abroad to Rome.

== Writings ==
=== Translations ===
Barbara Sanguszko translated into Polish two religious tracts by Louise de La Vallière, former French royal mistress turned Carmelite nun, published in Lublin in 1743. She translated a series of reflections on religious and moral themes by Cardinal Giovanni Bona. In the 1760s, she translated a manual of medicine, she had commissioned from the Sanguszko personal physician, Dr. Francis Curtius. This was followed in 1788 by a translation of the weighty two-volume anti-Voltaire novel Le Comte de Valmont, ou, Les égaremens de la raison by Philippe Louis Gérard.

=== Original works ===
- In 1755, she wrote a guide for mothers whose daughter was about to be married: Nauka matki córce swojej idącej za mąż dana, a przez osobę wielce szanującą takie dla dzieci nauki do druku podana, Warsaw: 1756; 2nd edition: Lwów, 1760 under a revised title, Uwagi pewnej chwalebnej matki, godnej córce swojej, gdy ją za mąż wydawała, na pożegnanie podane - The observations of a certain blessed mother to her daughter as a farewell upon her marriage; re-issued, Warsaw: 1763; Chełm: 1772; Kalisz: 1783 (as above); published anonymously.
- Wiersze w rozmaitych materiach. - 'Poems on a variety of themes', (intro. I. Krasicki – unidentified publisher).
- A fragment of a poem by Sanguszko (translation of a letter from Frederik II to his brother) dated 1760 (

=== Correspondence ===
1. Correspondence with Janusz Aleksander Sanguszko, her step-son, from 1754
2. To Antoni Lubomirski, voyevoda of Lublin, dated 23 April 1754
3. To Adam Krasinski, 2 letters of 16 August and 24 November 1769
4. To Stanisław August Poniatowski: from 1763.
5. To Stanisław August Poniatowski and A. Mokronowski, 2 undated letters
6. To Paweł Benoē
