= Szymon Samuel Sanguszko =

Polish nobleman (died 1638)

Szymon (Symon) Samuel Sanguszko (Lithuanian: Samuelis Šimonas Sanguška; before 1592 – November 1638) was a noble of the Polish–Lithuanian Commonwealth. He was castellan of Mścisław from 1620 and Voivode of Mińsk, later, from 1626 or 1629 voivode of Witebsk.

He was raised by the Sapieha family, including Lew Sapieha. Due to those connections he quickly gained political connections. In 1620, he becomes the marshal of Orsza and castellan of Mścisław. He took part in the Polish–Russian War, where he fought near Moscow, and he also fought in the Polish–Swedish War. He was an envoy to Moscow at some point.

First of the Sanguszko family to convert from Eastern Orthodox to Catholicism, he supported conversions to Catholicism among his subjects. Possibly a minor writer in his times, he was considered a well-educated and an amateur artist.

Son of Andrzej Sanguszko and Zofia Sapieha (Sapieżanka). Married Anna Zawiszanka in 1606, they had three sons and five daughters. After her death he married Helena z Gosiewskich. Father of Kazimierz Sanguszko (died in 1655 war with Muscovy), Hieronim Sanguszko (bishop of Smoleńsk) and Jan Władyslaw Sanguszko-Lubartowicz, military officer (rotmistrz and pułkownik of Winged Hussars) who continued the Sanguszko line.

== Sources ==
- The Golden Horde: The Encyclopedia. The 3 tons / red. GP Pasha and others. Volume 2: Cadet Corps – Jackiewicz. – Minsk: Belarusian Encyclopedia, 2005. – 788 s.: Il. ISBN 985-11-0378-0.
