= Mali Zahaitsi =

Rural locality in Ternopil Oblast, Ukraine

Mali Zahaitsi Малі Загайці
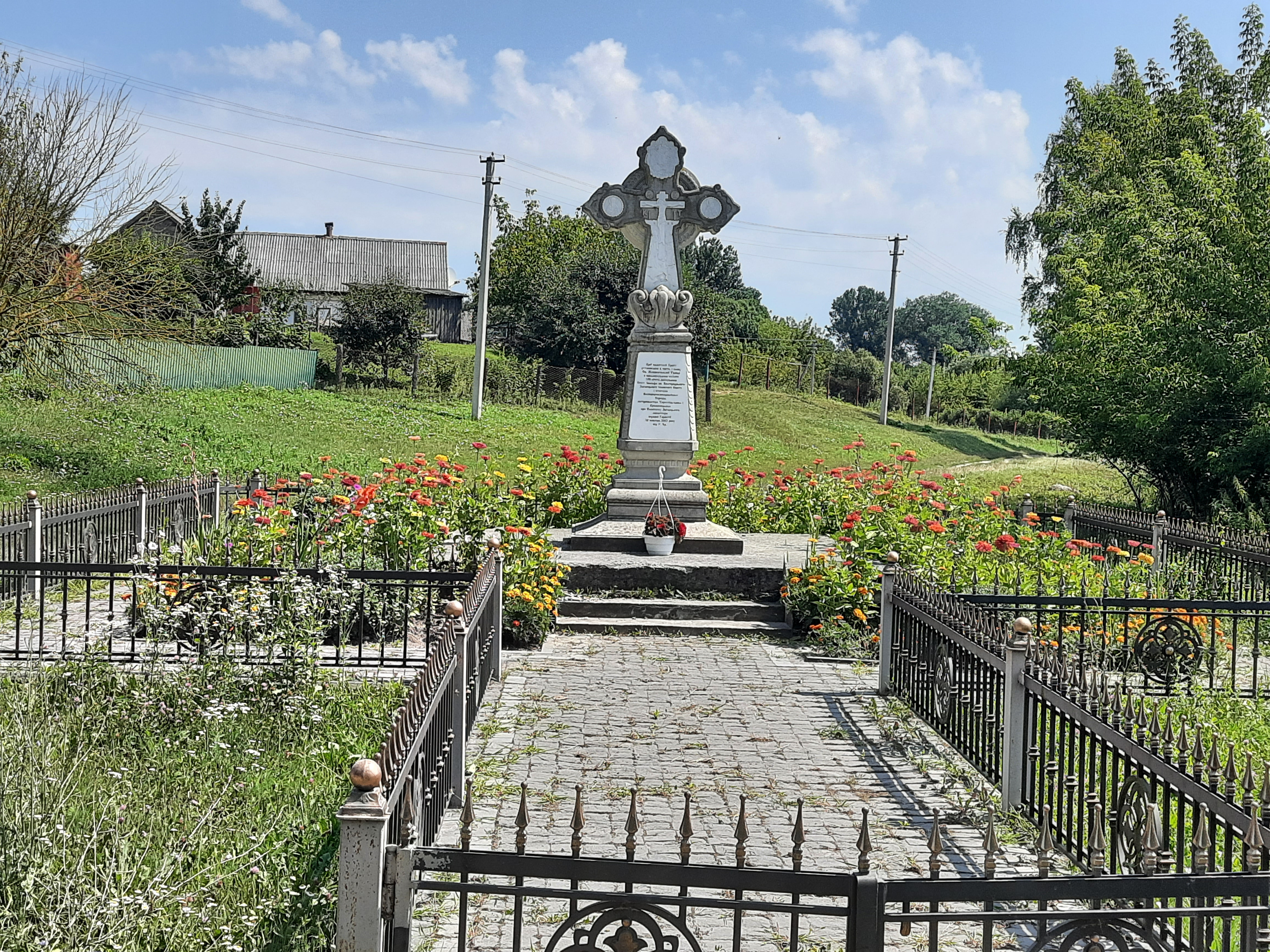
- Memorial cross in Mali Zahaitsi

- Location in Ternopil Oblast
- Coordinates: 50°0′35″N 26°2′32″E
- Country: Ukraine
- Oblast: Ternopil Oblast
- Raion: Kremenets Raion
- Hromada: Velyki Dederkaly Hromada
- Time zone: UTC+2 (EET)
  - Summer (DST): UTC+3 (EEST)
- Postal code: 47153

Mali Zahaitsi (Ukrainian: Малі Загайці) is a village in Velyki Dederkaly rural hromada, Kremenets Raion, Ternopil Oblast, Ukraine.

== History ==
In 1636 an Eastern Orthodox monastery of Saint John the Merciful was established in the village. In 1714 it was transferred to the Uniate Church, remaining under its control until 1794. During the 18th century the monastery hosted a school of philosophy attended by Basilian monks. Starting from 1774, teaching of rhetorics also took place at the monastery. Its library and archive possessed valuable books, including a copy of the Ostroh Bible.

After the liquidation of Shumsk Raion on 19 July 2020, the village became part of the Kremenets Raion.

== Bibliography ==
- "Zahajce Małe 1.) wś, powiat krzemieniecki, gmina Dederkały". Geographical Dictionary of the Kingdom of Poland (in Polish). 14. Warszawa: Kasa im. Józefa Mianowskiego. 1895. p. 278.
- "Zahajce Małe 1.)". Geographical Dictionary of the Kingdom of Poland (in Polish). p. 709.
