= Matviivtsi =

Rural locality in Ternopil Oblast, Ukraine

Matviivtsi Матвіївці
- Location in Ternopil Oblast
- Coordinates: 49°57′17″N 25°58′54″E
- Country: Ukraine
- Oblast: Ternopil Oblast
- Raion: Kremenets Raion
- Hromada: Velyki Dederkaly Hromada
- Time zone: UTC+2 (EET)
  - Summer (DST): UTC+3 (EEST)
- Postal code: 47164

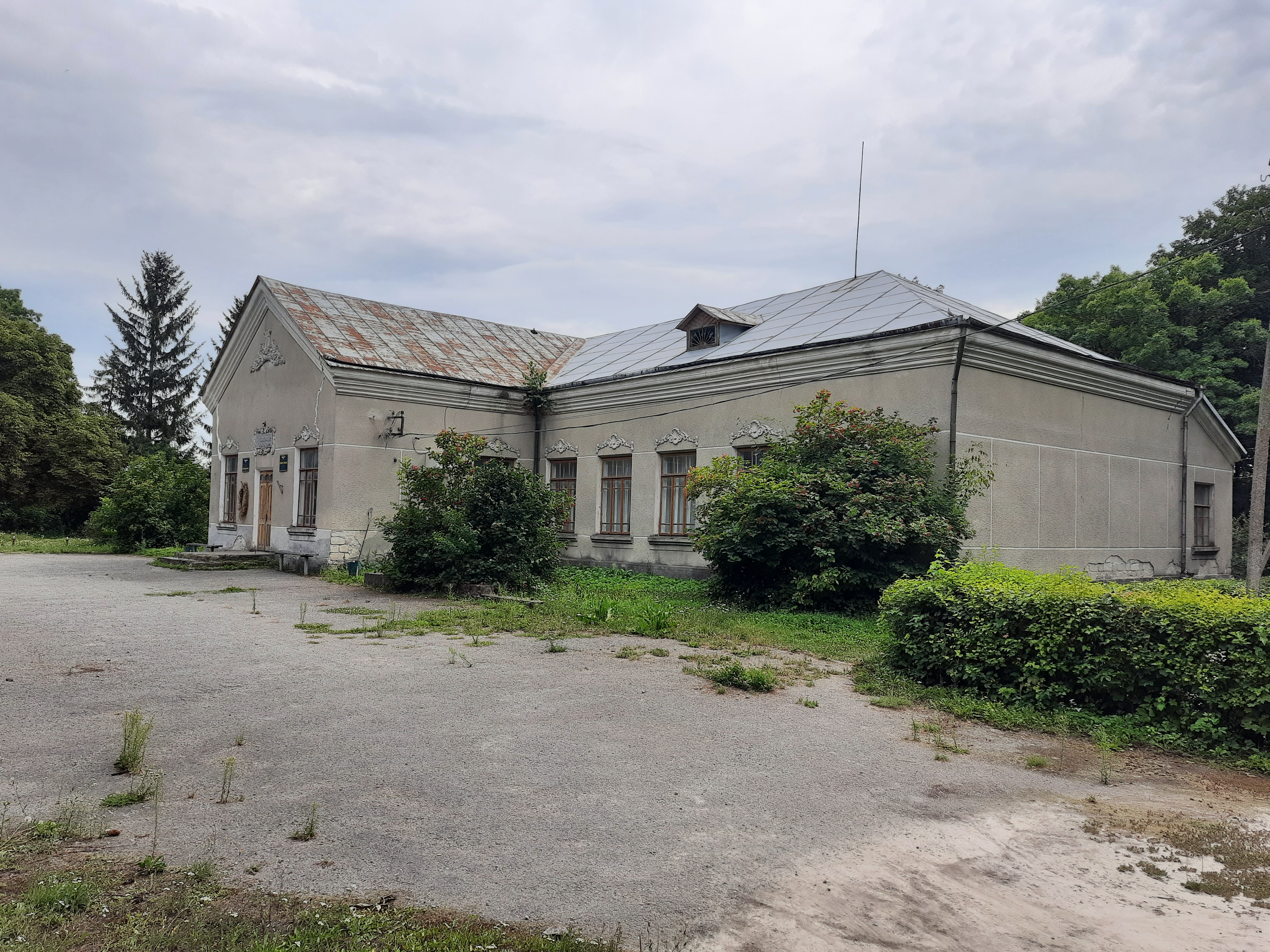
Matviivtsi Community Centre

Matviivtsi (Ukrainian: Матвіївці) is a village in Velyki Dederkaly rural hromada, Kremenets Raion, Ternopil Oblast, Ukraine. After the liquidation of the Shumsk Raion on 19 July 2020, the village became part of the Kremenets Raion.

== Bibliography ==
- "Matwijkowce, pow. krzemieniecki". Geographical Dictionary of the Kingdom of Poland (in Polish). 6. Warszawa: Kasa im. Józefa Mianowskiego. 1885. p. 176.
