= Tury, Ternopil Oblast =

Rural locality in Ternopil Oblast, Ukraine

Tury Тури
- Location in Ternopil Oblast
- Coordinates: 50°1′6″N 26°4′24″E
- Country: Ukraine
- Oblast: Ternopil Oblast
- Raion: Kremenets Raion
- Hromada: Velyki Dederkaly Hromada
- Time zone: UTC+2 (EET)
  - Summer (DST): UTC+3 (EEST)
- Postal code: 47153

Tury (Ukrainian: Тури) is a village in Velyki Dederkaly rural hromada, Kremenets Raion, Ternopil Oblast, Ukraine.

== History ==
The first written mention is from 1538.

== Religion ==
- Saint Elijah the Prophet church (1995)
