= Velyki Dederkaly rural hromada =

Rural hromada in Ternopil Oblast, Ukraine

Velyki Dederkaly rural hromada Великодедеркальська сільська громада
- hromada
- Location within Ternopil Oblast Location within Ukraine
- Coordinates: 50°1′30″N 26°7′0″E
- Country: Ukraine
- Oblast: Ternopil Oblast
- Raion: Kremenets Raion
- Administrative center: Velyki Dederkaly

Government
  - Hromada head: Yurii Panasiuk

Area
  - Total: 76.9 km^{2} (29.7 sq mi)

Population (2022)
  - Total: 6,228
- Villages: 13
- Website: dederkaly-otg.gov.ua

Velyki Dederkaly rural territorial hromada (Ukrainian: Великодедеркальська територіальна громада, romanized: Velykodederkalska silska terytorialna hromada) is a hromada in Ukraine, in Kremenets Raion of Ternopil Oblast. The administrative center is the village of Velyki Dederkaly. Its population is 6,228 (2022 estimate) Established on 14 September 2016.

== Settlements ==
The hromada consists of 13 villages:

- Velyki Dederkaly
- Velyki Zahaitsi
- Vovkivtsi
- Hrynkivtsi
- Mali Dederkaly
- Mali Zahaitsi
- Matviivtsi
- Miziuryntsi
- Radoshivka
- Sadky
- Temnohaitsi
- Tury
- Shkrobotivka
