= Mali Dederkaly =

Rural locality in Ternopil Oblast, Ukraine

Mali Dederkaly Малі Дедеркали
- Location in Ternopil Oblast
- Coordinates: 50°2′29″N 26°6′33″E
- Country: Ukraine
- Oblast: Ternopil Oblast
- Raion: Kremenets Raion
- Hromada: Velyki Dederkaly Hromada
- Time zone: UTC+2 (EET)
  - Summer (DST): UTC+3 (EEST)
- Postal code: 47173

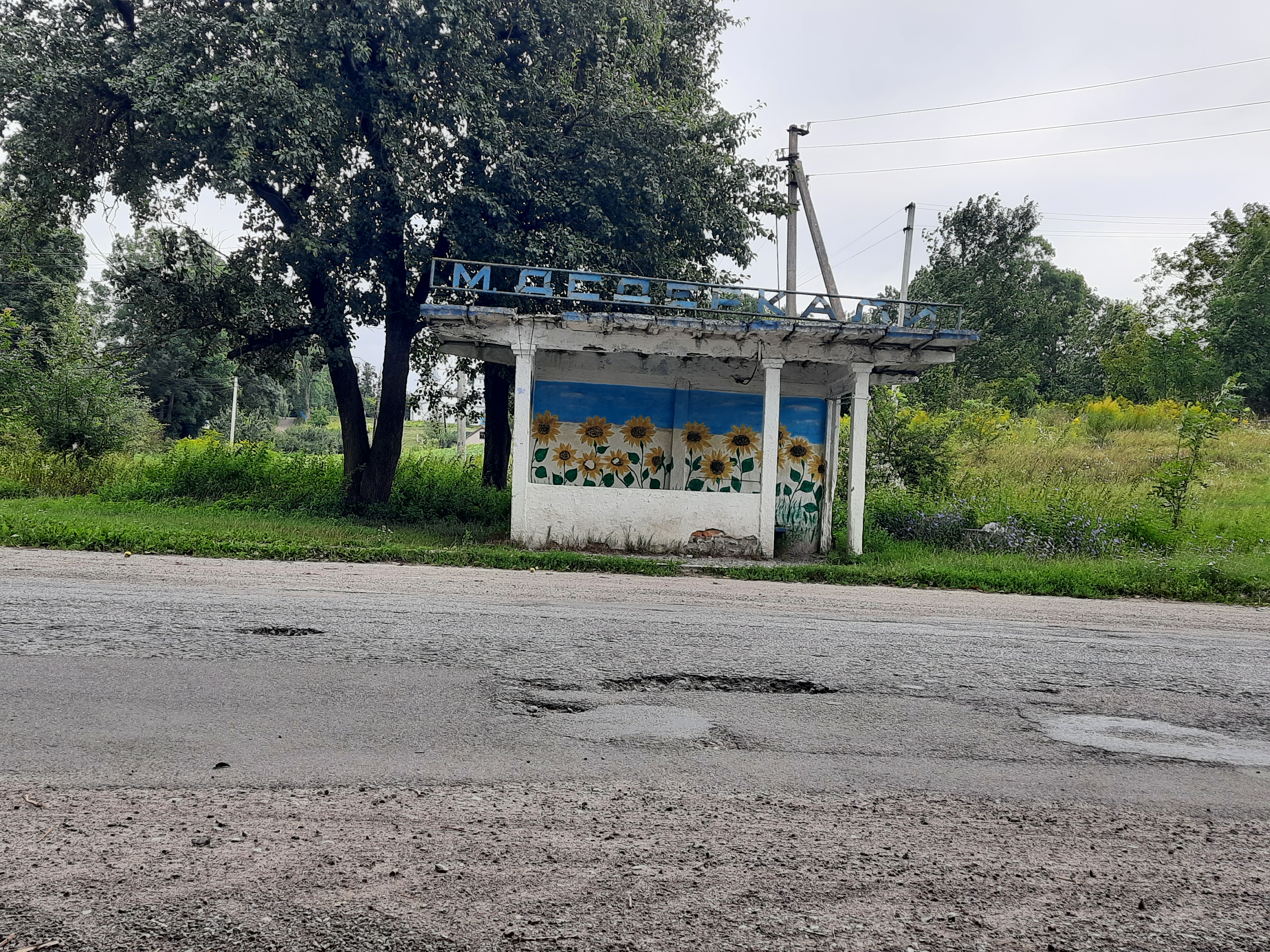
A bus stop in Mali Dederkaly

Mali Dederkaly (Ukrainian: Малі Дедеркали) is a village in Velyki Dederkaly rural hromada, Kremenets Raion, Ternopil Oblast, Ukraine. After the liquidation of the Shumsk Raion on 19 July 2020, the village became part of the Kremenets Raion.

== Bibliography ==
- "Dederkały Małe". Geographical Dictionary of the Kingdom of Poland (in Polish). p. 397.
