= Hrynkivtsi =

Rural locality in Ternopil Oblast, Ukraine

Hrynkivtsi Гриньківці
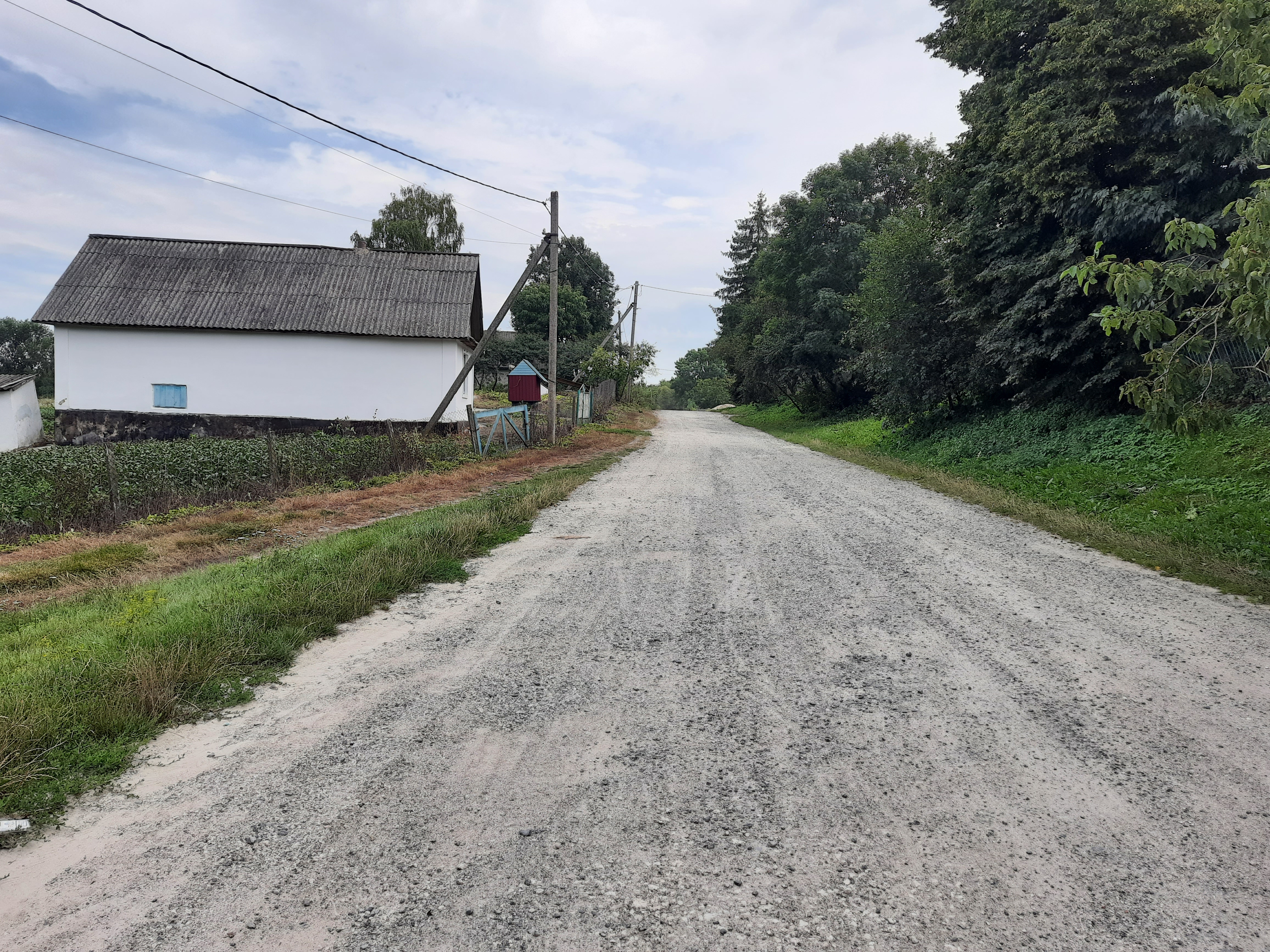
- Northern entrance to Hyrnkivitsi

- Location in Ternopil Oblast
- Coordinates: 49°56′17″N 26°0′22″E
- Country: Ukraine
- Oblast: Ternopil Oblast
- Raion: Kremenets Raion
- Hromada: Velyki Dederkaly Hromada
- Time zone: UTC+2 (EET)
  - Summer (DST): UTC+3 (EEST)
- Postal code: 47164

Hrynkivtsi (Ukrainian: Гриньківці) is a village in Velyki Dederkaly rural hromada, Kremenets Raion, Ternopil Oblast, Ukraine. After the liquidation of the Shumsk Raion on 19 July 2020, the village became part of the Kremenets Raion.

== Bibliography ==
- "Hrynkowce, powiat krzemieniecki, gm. Borsuki". Geographical Dictionary of the Kingdom of Poland (in Polish). p. 595.
