= Vovkivtsi, Kremenets Raion, Ternopil Oblast =

Rural locality in Ternopil Oblast, Ukraine

Vovkivtsi Вовківці
- Location in Ternopil Oblast
- Coordinates: 50°2′10″N 26°8′21″E
- Country: Ukraine
- Oblast: Ternopil Oblast
- Raion: Kremenets Raion
- Hromada: Velyki Dederkaly Hromada
- Time zone: UTC+2 (EET)
  - Summer (DST): UTC+3 (EEST)
- Postal code: 47171

Vovkivtsi (Ukrainian: Вовківці) is a village in Velyki Dederkaly rural hromada, Kremenets Raion, Ternopil Oblast, Ukraine. After the liquidation of the Shumsk Raion on 19 July 2020, the village became part of the Kremenets Raion.

== Bibliography ==
- "Wołkowce (1), pow. krzemieniecki". Geographical Dictionary of the Kingdom of Poland (in Polish). 13. Warszawa: Kasa im. Józefa Mianowskiego. 1893. p. 872.
