= Sadky, Kremenets Raion, Ternopil Oblast =

Rural locality in Ternopil Oblast, Ukraine

Sadky Садки
- Location in Ternopil Oblast
- Coordinates: 50°3′11″N 26°11′24″E
- Country: Ukraine
- Oblast: Ternopil Oblast
- Raion: Kremenets Raion
- Hromada: Velyki Dederkaly Hromada
- Time zone: UTC+2 (EET)
  - Summer (DST): UTC+3 (EEST)
- Postal code: 47143

Sadky (Ukrainian: Садки) is a village in Velyki Dederkaly rural hromada, Kremenets Raion, Ternopil Oblast, Ukraine. After the liquidation of the Shumsk Raion on 19 July 2020, the village became part of the Kremenets Raion.

== Bibliography ==
- "Sadki 5.), pow. krzemieniecki". Geographical Dictionary of the Kingdom of Poland (in Polish). 10. Warszawa: Kasa im. Józefa Mianowskiego. 1889. p. 196.
