= Vitebsk Voivodeship =

Territory in the Grand Duchy of Lithuania

Coordinates: 55°11′53″N 30°10′39″E

Vitebsk Voivodeship Vitebsk Voivodeship Palatinatus Vitebsciensis Województwo witebskie
- Voivodeship of the Grand Duchy of Lithuania, later Polish–Lithuanian Commonwealth
- 1503–1772
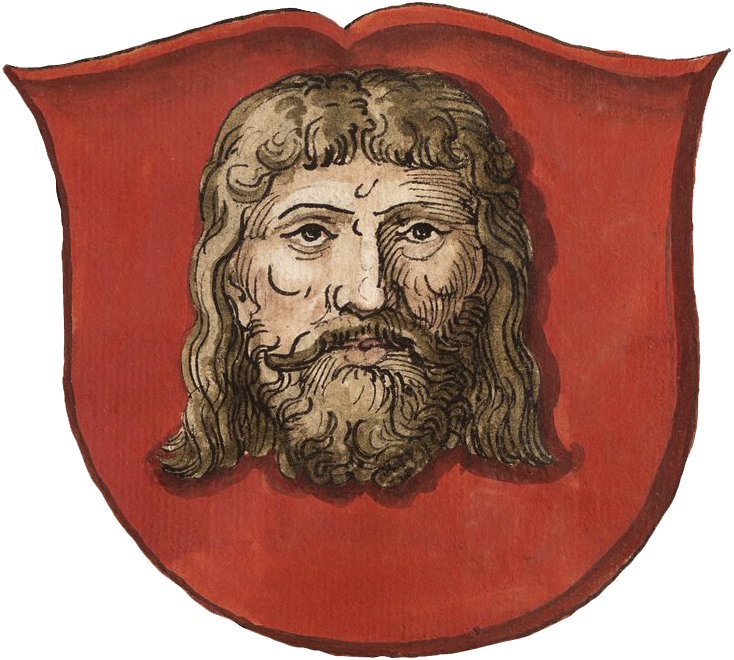
- Flag Coat of arms

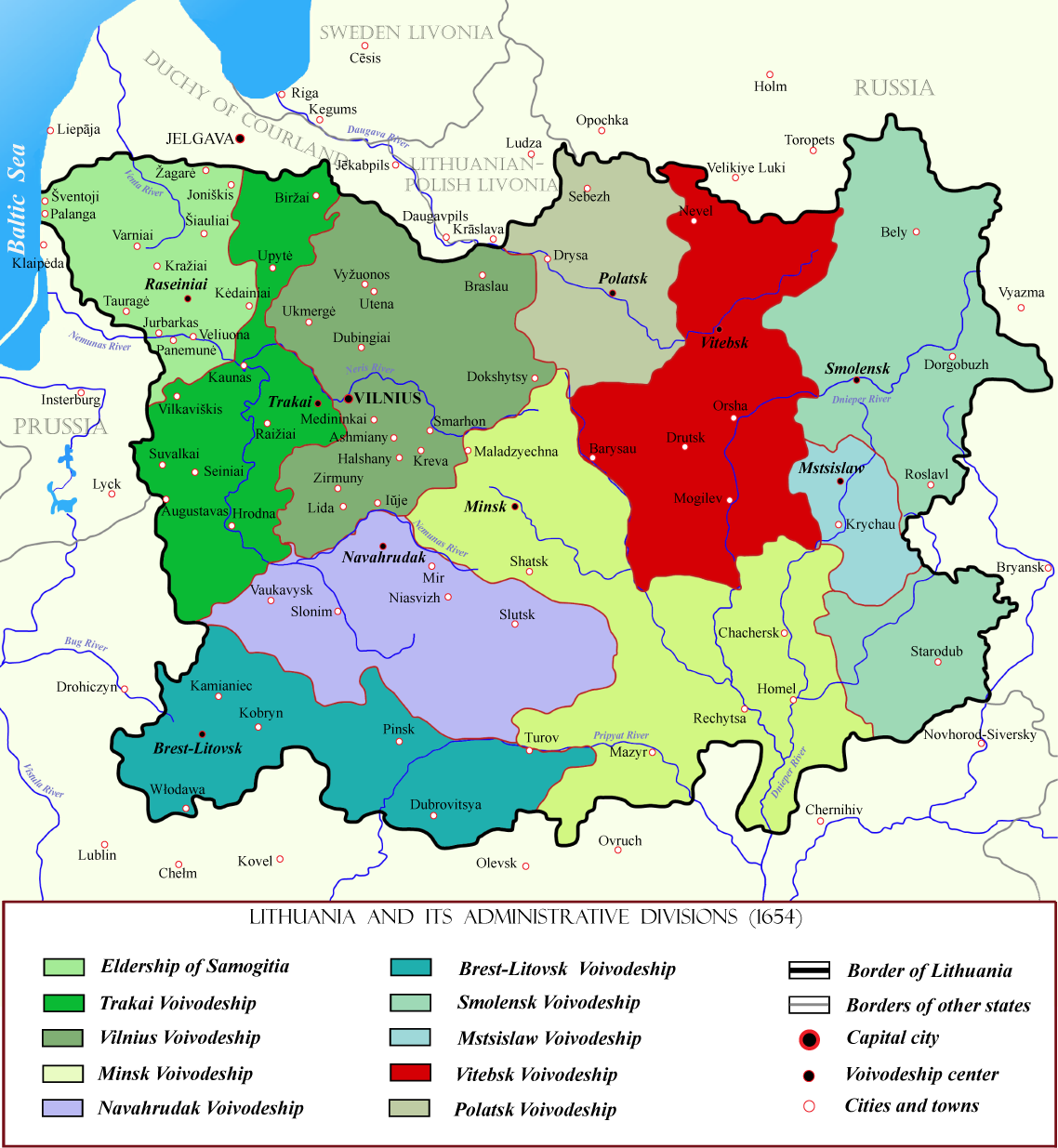
- Vitebsk Voivodeship in red. Voivodeship's borders did not change since the Union of Lublin.
- Witebsk Voivodeship in the Polish–Lithuanian Commonwealth
- Capital: Vitebsk
- Area
- 24,600 km^{2} (9,500 sq mi)
- History
  - Established: 1503
  - First partition of the Polish–Lithuanian Commonwealth: 1772
- Political subdivisions: none
Preceded by	Succeeded by
Principality of Vitebsk	Russian Empire
- Today part of: Belarus; Russia

Vitebsk Voivodeship (Belarusian: Віцебскае ваяводзтва; Polish: Województwo witebskie; Latin: Palatinatus Vitebsciensis) was a unit of administrative division and local government in the Grand Duchy of Lithuania (from 1569 Polish–Lithuanian Commonwealth) from the 15th century until the partitions of Poland in 1795.

== History ==
Zygmunt Gloger in his monumental book Historical Geography of the Lands of Old Poland provides this description of the Witebsk Voivodeship:

“Witebsk (in Latin Vitebscum), located on the Dvina river, was one of main gord of the Principality of Polotsk. In the second half of the 12th century, it emerged as a local center of government. Conquered by one of the sons of Mindaugas in ca. 1239, it became a permanent part of the Grand Duchy of Lithuania since the times of Gediminas. In ca. 1342 Witebsk was already the seat of a starosta, who in the early 16th century were named voivodes. First voivode of Witebsk was Jerzy Chlebowicz (...)

The Dvina river divided the voivodeship into two parts, of which northern one was smaller. Since the town of Witebsk was located in the middle of a sparsely populated province, at first the voivodeship was not divided into counties. Later on, however, the County of Orsza, which had been part of Smolensk Voivodeship, was attached to Witebsk Voivodeship (...) Witebsk Voivodeship remained in the Commonwealth until September 1772, when most of it was annexed by the Russian Empire. What remained was southern part of the Land of Orsza, which belonged to the Grand Duchy of Lithuania until 1793 (...)

Starostas resided at Witebsk and Orsza, while local sejmiks took place in both towns. Altogether, Witebsk Voivodeship elected four deputies to the Sejm - two from each county. After the first partition, the sejmiks were moved to the town of Cholopienicze, located in Minsk Voivodeship”.

== Administration ==
Voivodeship Governor (Wojewoda) seat:

- Vitebsk

Voivodes: Samuel Sanguszko (1629- XI 1638), Paweł Jan Sapieha (15 VIII 1646-)

Administrative division:

- since the Truce of Andrusovo (1667), Vitebsk Voivodeship consisted of two counties (powiats): Witebsk and Orsza. The first was lost to the Russian Empire in 1772, and only a little part of the second belonged to the Commonwealth until 1793.

== Sources ==
- Witebsk Voivodeship, description by Zygmunt Gloger
