= Velyki Zahaitsi =

Rural locality in Ternopil Oblast, Ukraine

Velyki Zahaitsi Великі Загайці
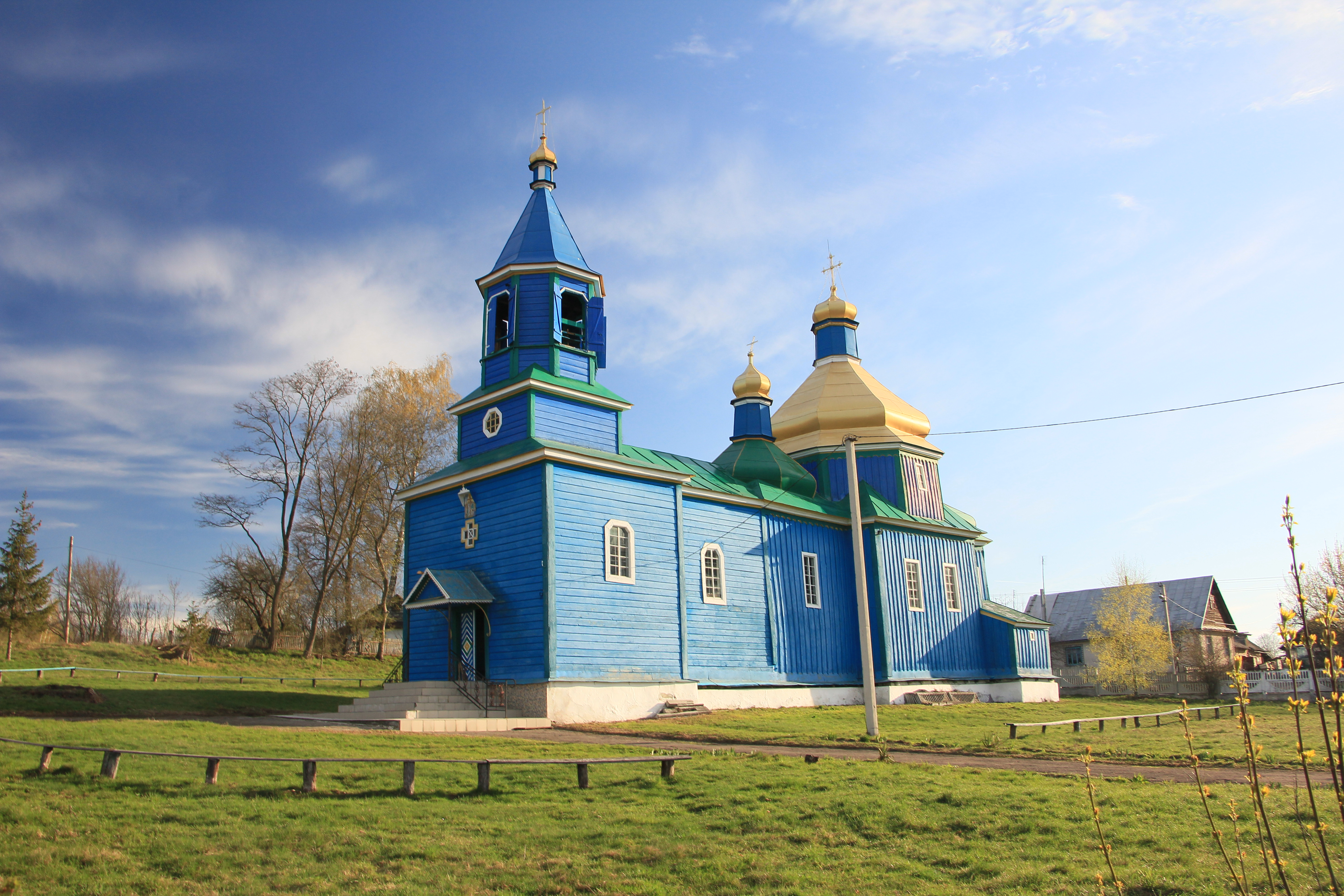
- Church of the Exaltation of the Holy Cross

- Location in Ternopil Oblast
- Coordinates: 49°59′56″N 26°1′3″E
- Country: Ukraine
- Oblast: Ternopil Oblast
- Raion: Kremenets Raion
- Hromada: Velyki Dederkaly Hromada
- Time zone: UTC+2 (EET)
  - Summer (DST): UTC+3 (EEST)
- Postal code: 47153

Velyki Zahaitsi (Ukrainian: Великі Загайці) is a village in Velyki Dederkaly rural hromada, Kremenets Raion, Ternopil Oblast, Ukraine. After the liquidation of the Shumsk Raion on 19 July 2020, the village became part of the Kremenets Raion.

== Bibliography ==
- "Zahajce Wielkie 2.) wś, powiat krzemieniecki, gmina Dederkały". Geographical Dictionary of the Kingdom of Poland (in Polish). 14. Warszawa: Kasa im. Józefa Mianowskiego. 1895. p. 278.
- "Zahajce Wielkie 2.)". Geographical Dictionary of the Kingdom of Poland (in Polish). p. 709.
