= Adam Aleksander Sanguszko =

Polish noble (c. 1590 – 1653)

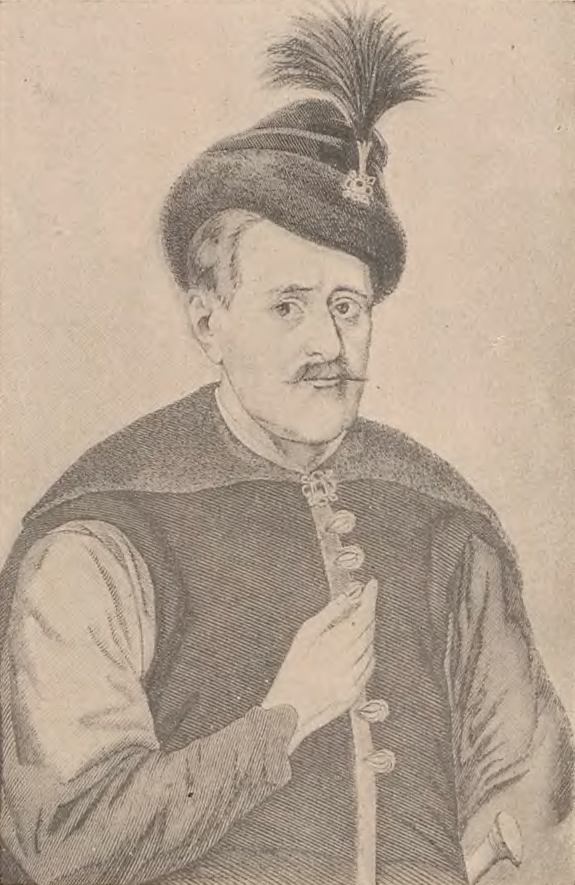

Adam Aleksander Sanguszko (Lithuanian: Adomas Aleksandras Sanguška; c. 1590 – 1653), of Pogoń Litewska, was a Ruthenian noble of the Polish–Lithuanian Commonwealth. He was the castellan of Kiev from 1618, voivode of Podole from 1621 to 1630, voivode of Wołyń from 1630, and starosta of Włodzimierz (until 1625).

His parents were Hryhoryi Sanguszko and Zofia Hołowczyńska. He married Katarzyna Uchańska (d. 1650) before 1616. They had no children and the Sanguszko-Koszyrski line became extinct with Adam's death.

During the royal election in 1648, he seemed to have supported the Ruthenian Eastern Orthodox nobles and the Cossacks, arguing for the need to reform or annul the Union of Brest In 1637, he founded the Kamień Dominicans.
