= Paweł Karol Sanguszko =

Paweł Karol Sanguszko of the Pogoń Litewska coat of arms (born 1680, died 14 April 1750 in Velyki Zahaitsi, Volhynia) was a prince, Court Treasurer of Lithuania from 1711, Court Marshal of Lithuania from 1713, and Grand Marshal of Lithuania from 1734. He was the 7th holder of the Ostrog Entail (*Ordynacja Ostrogska*), a colonel of the Lithuanian Guard, and the *starosta* (royal administrator) of Krzemieniec and Czerkasy; he was awarded the Order of the White Eagle. In 1708, he held the office of Lithuanian *stolnik*, resigning in 1709 following the return of Augustus II the Strong; he served as a *kaptur* court judge during the 1733 Polish–Lithuanian royal election.

== Career ==
In 1708, Sanguszko received the rank of Grand Administrator of Lithuania from Stanisław Leszczyński. The following year, 1709, after the return of Augustus II to Poland, he lost this position. In 1711, he was appointed Colonel of the Lithuanian Guard and Court Marshal. During the 1733 elections, he became a judge of the General Tribunal. In 1734, he was promoted to the title of Grand Marshal of Lithuania.

A supporter of Augustus II, following the latter's death in 1733, he was one of the proponents of the election of Augustus III. In 1735, he signed a resolution of the General Council of the Confederation of Warsaw.

== Commemoration ==
- School Complex No. 2 in Lubartów was named after him.

== Bibliography ==
- Elżbieta Aleksandrowska: "Sanguszkowa Barbara". In: Polski Słownik Biograficzny [[[Polish Biographical Dictionary]]]. Vol. XXXIV. Wrocław–Warszawa–Kraków, 1992–1993, pp. 517–521.
- Roman Marcinek: "Sanguszko Paweł Karol, Prince (1680–1750)". In: Polski Słownik Biograficzny [Polish Biographical Dictionary]. Vol. XXXIV. Wrocław–Warszawa–Kraków, 1992–1993, pp. 497–500.
