= Mesdames de France =

Form of address for several women

Mesdames (French pronunciation: [mɛdam], My Ladies) is a French form of address for several women. In the 18th century, Mesdames de France was used to designate the daughters of Louis XV, most of whom lived at the royal court and never married.

== Filles de France ==
Unlike other unmarried daughters of the nobility who were born demoiselles, the princesses who were the daughters of the kings of France were born with the rank and title of "dame."

A Daughter of France (fille de France) was thus addressed as Madame, followed by her first name or her title if she had one. The treatment was the same with the sole exception that with the eldest, it was not necessary to add the first name, and the simple appellation "Madame" sufficed to designate her.

The sister-in-law of the king was similarly treated. When one existed (this was the case for Louis XIV and Louis XVI but not for Louis XV, who had no living siblings during his reign), the first of the filles de France was given the title of "Madame Royale."

== A particular group ==
The appellation of "Mesdames" remained in history because of particular genealogical, political, and strategic circumstances that caused many of the eight daughters that Louis XV had with Marie Leszczynska to remain at the French court, including:

- Marie Louise Élisabeth of France (1727 - 1759), Madame Première
- Anne Henriette de France (1727 - 1752), her twin, entitled Madame Seconde, then Madame after the marriage of her twin sister
- Marie Louise de France (1728 - 1733), Madame Troisième, then Madame Louise
- Marie Adélaïde de France (1732 - 1800), Madame Quatrième, then Madame Troisième, then Madame Adélaïde and finally Madame, after the death of Madame Henriette
- Marie Louise Thérèse Victoire de France (1733 - 1799), Madame Quatrième, then Madame Victoire
- Sophie Philippine Élisabeth Justine de France (1734 - 1782), Madame Cinquième then Madame Sophie
- Marie Thérèse Félicité de France (1736 - 1744), Madame Sixième, then Madame Thérèse
- Louise Marie de France (1737 - 1787), Madame Septième or Dernière, then Madame Louise
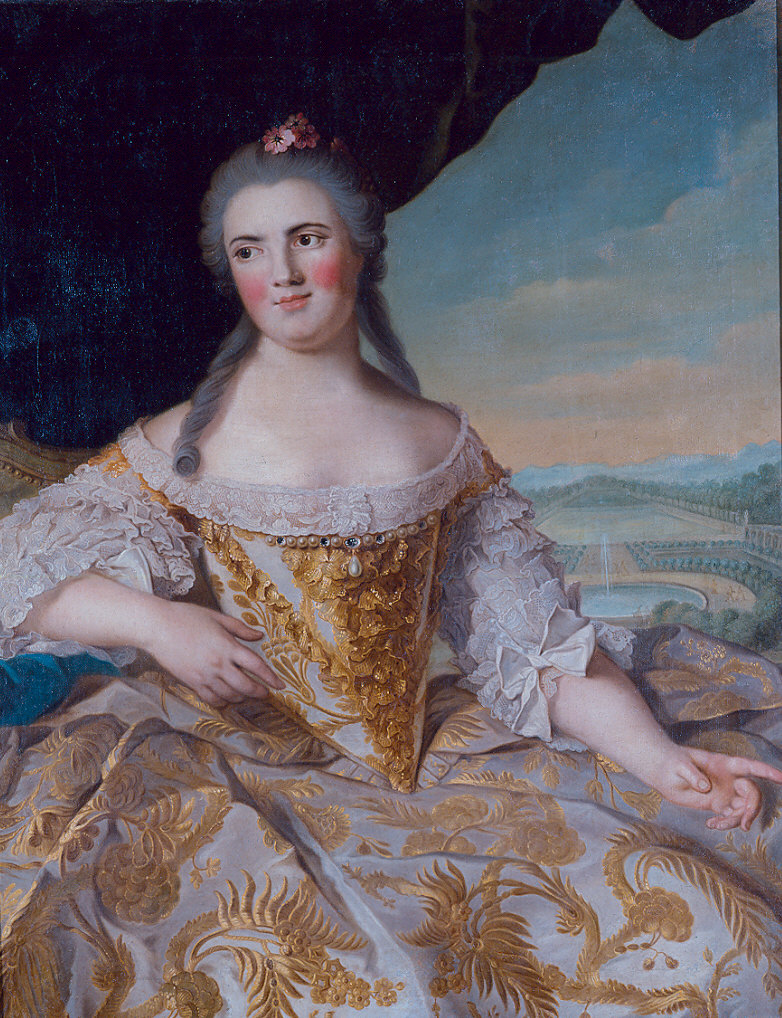
Louise Élisabeth of France

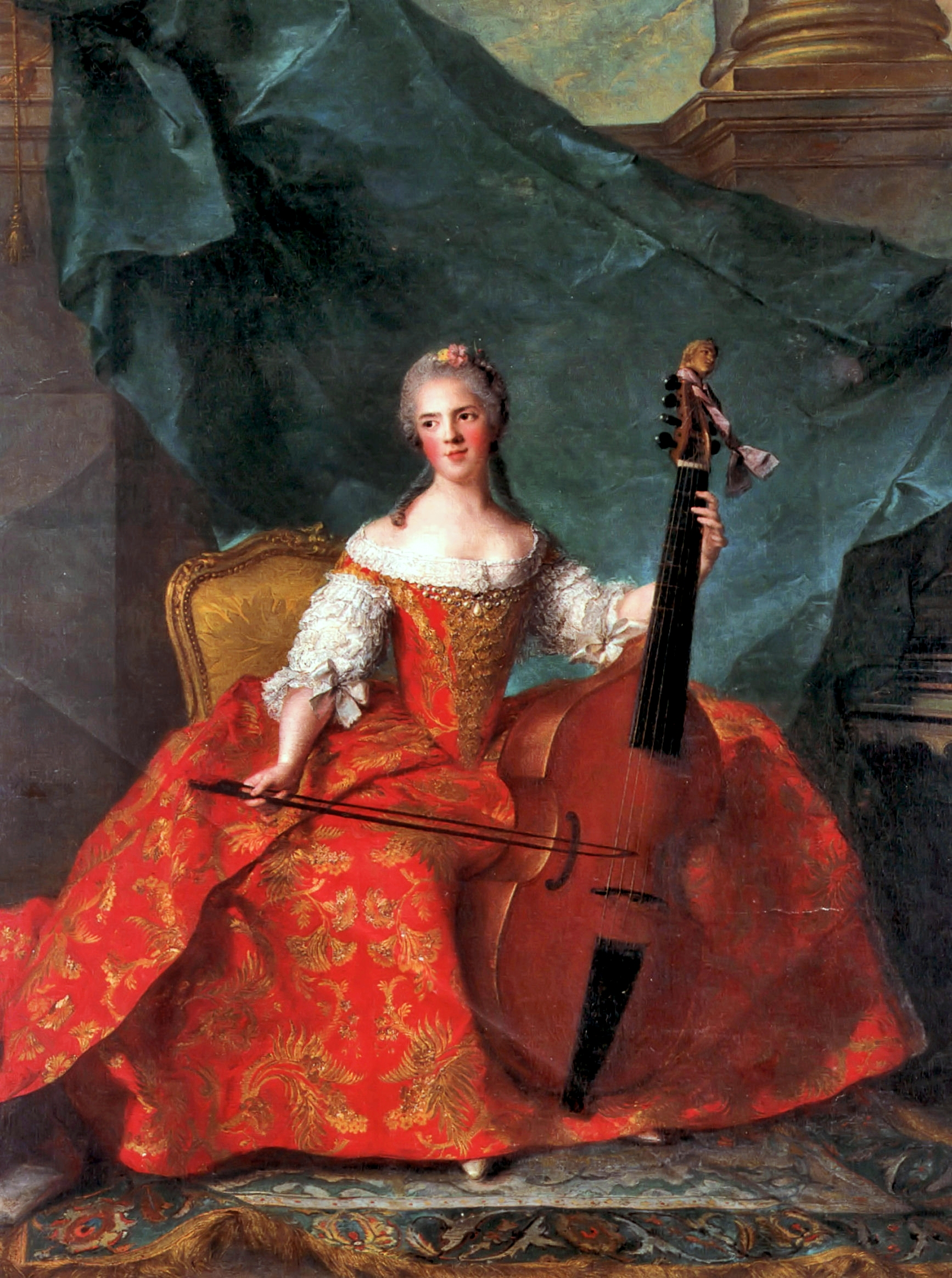
Henriette of France

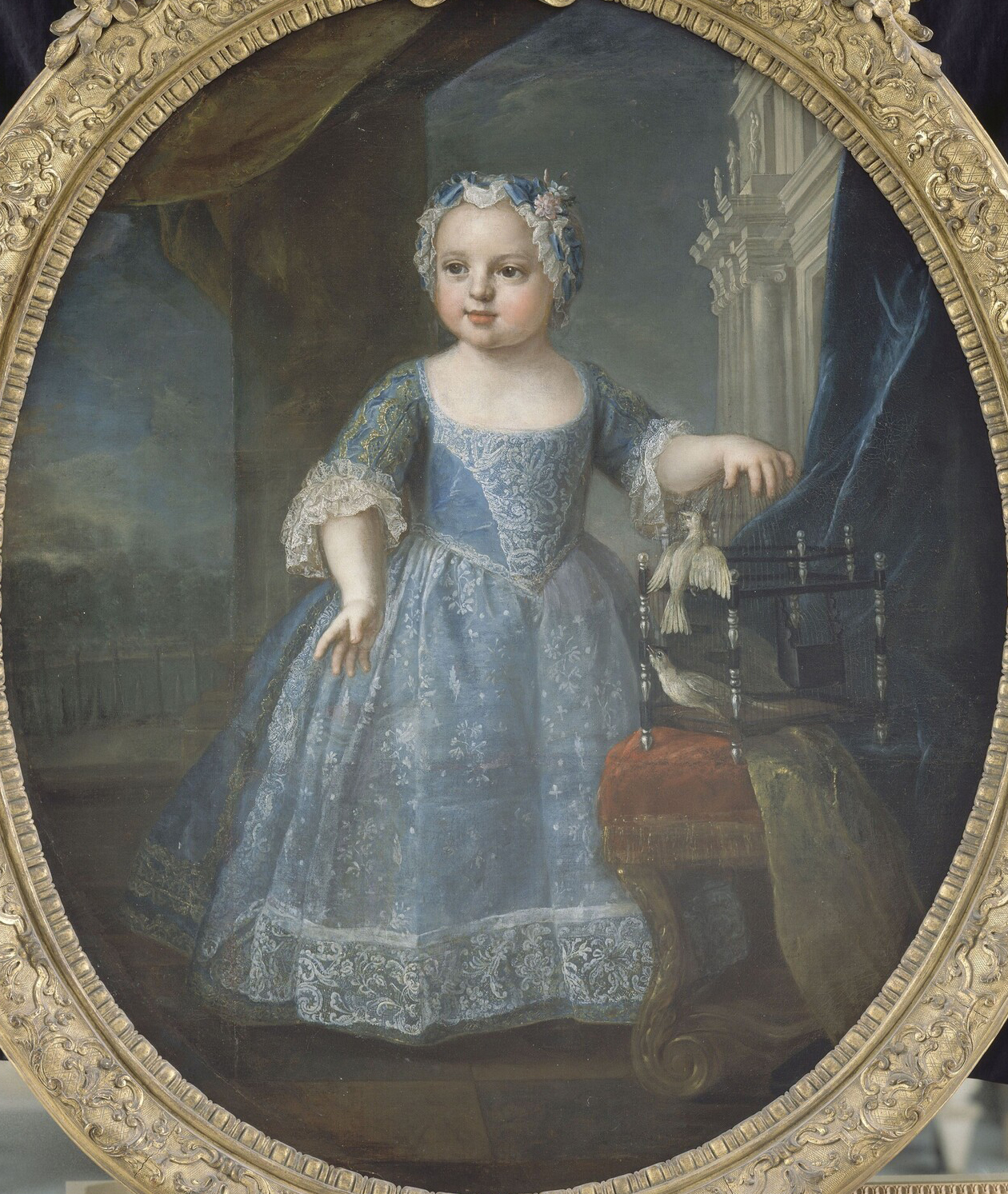
Marie Louise de France

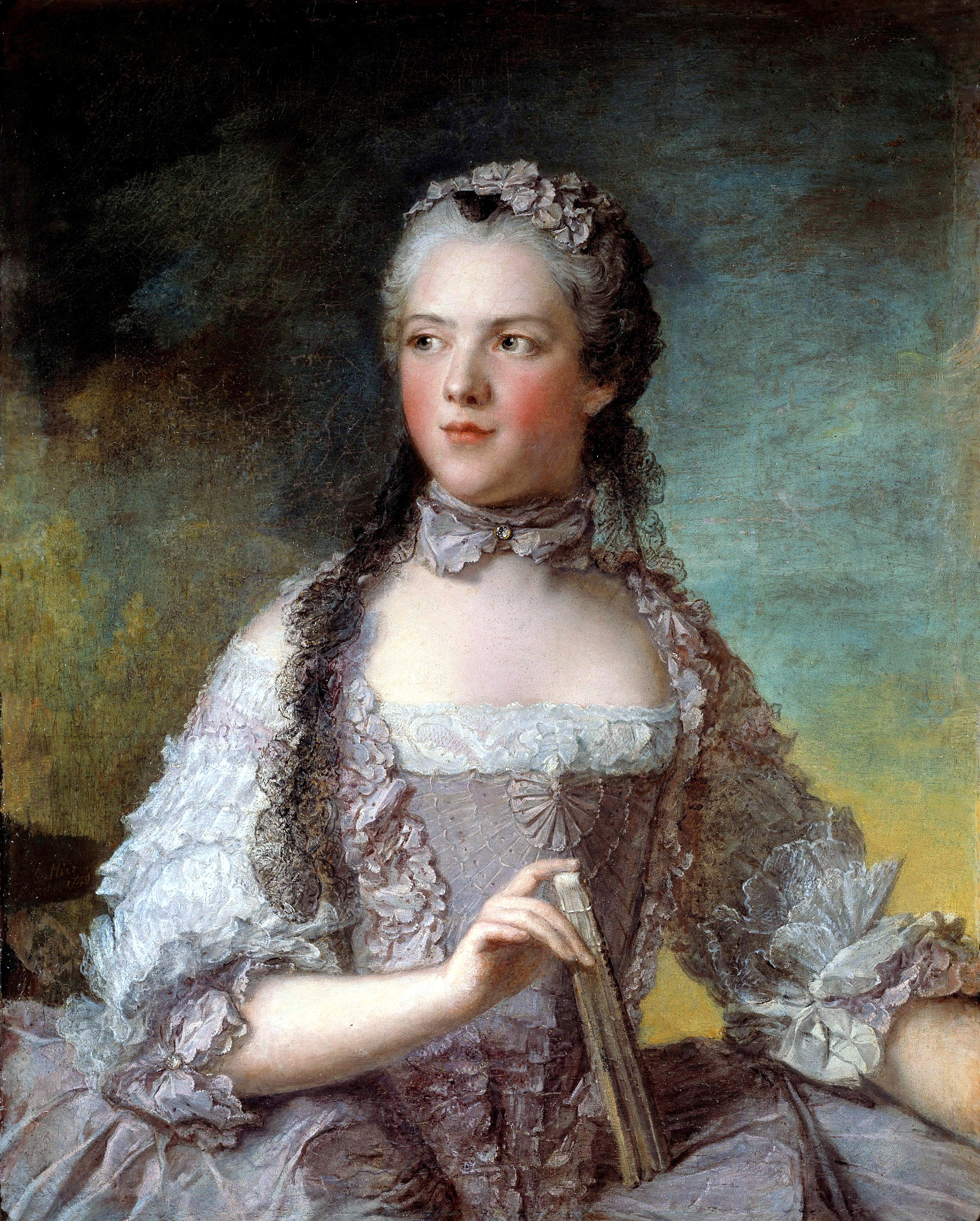
Marie Adélaïde of France

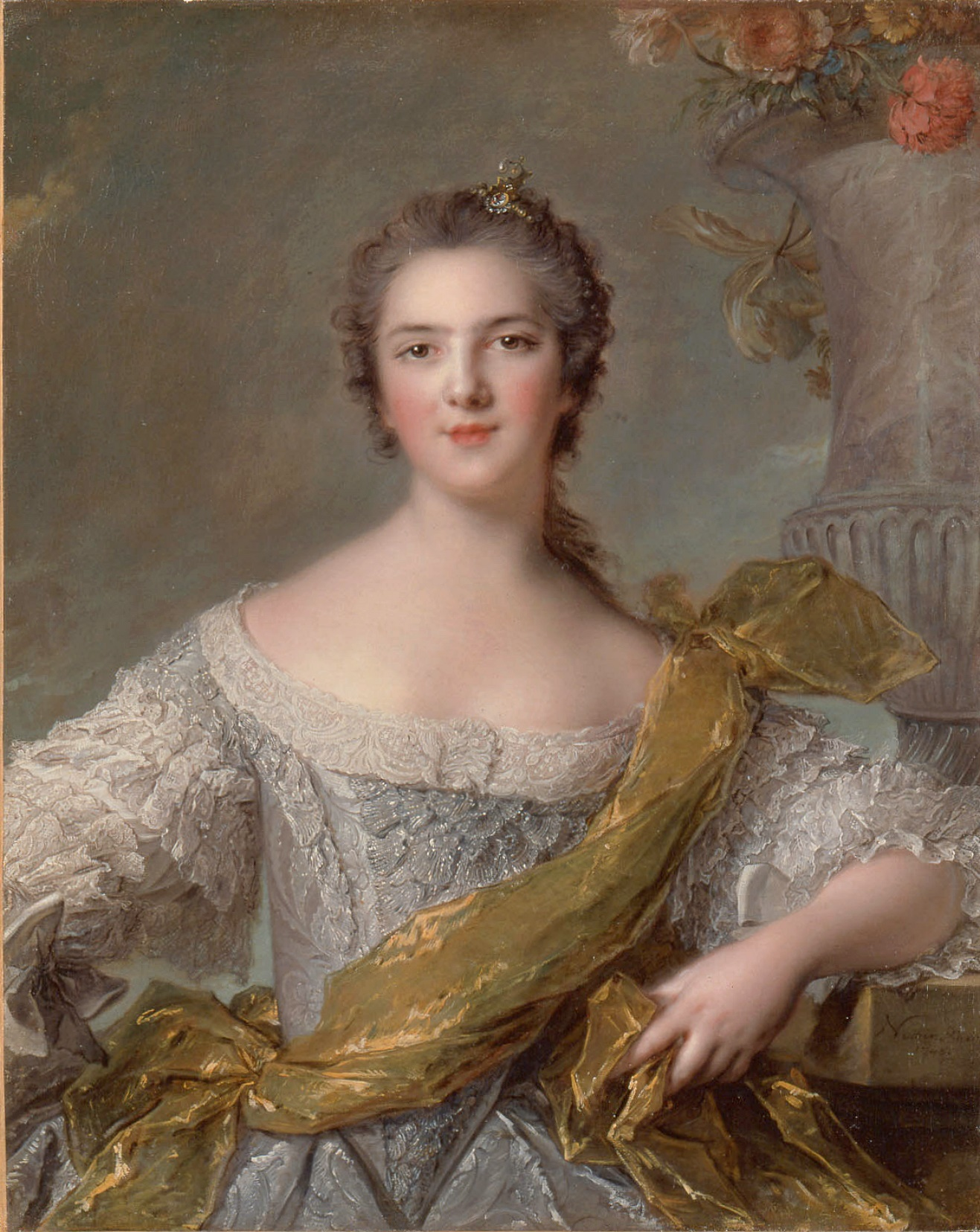
Victoire of France

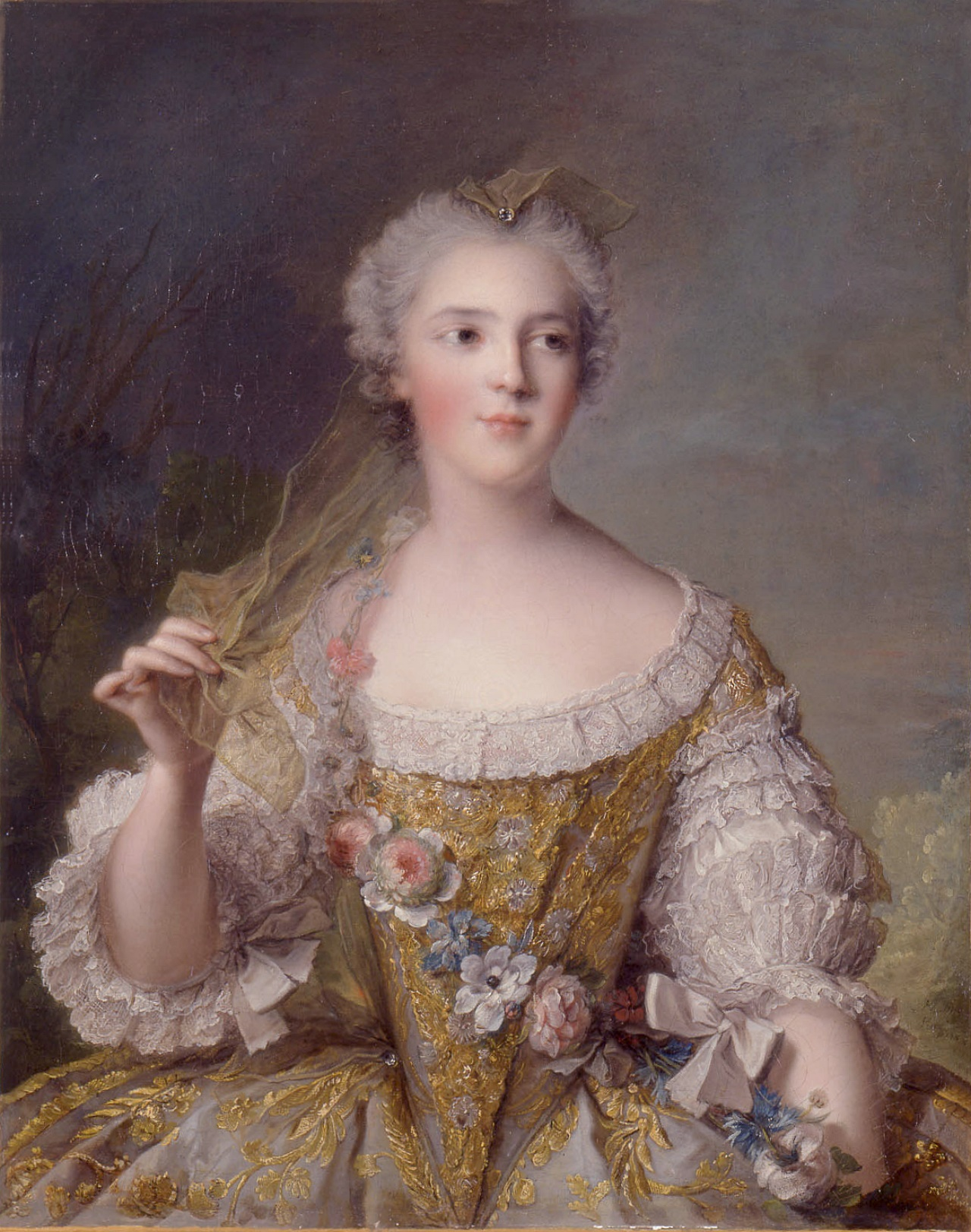
Sophie of France

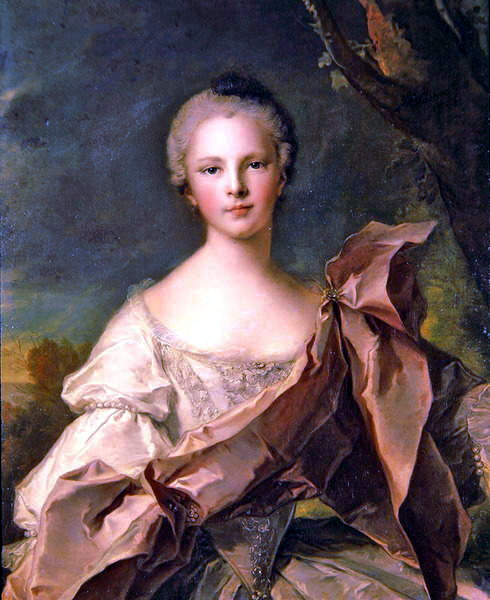
Thérèse of France

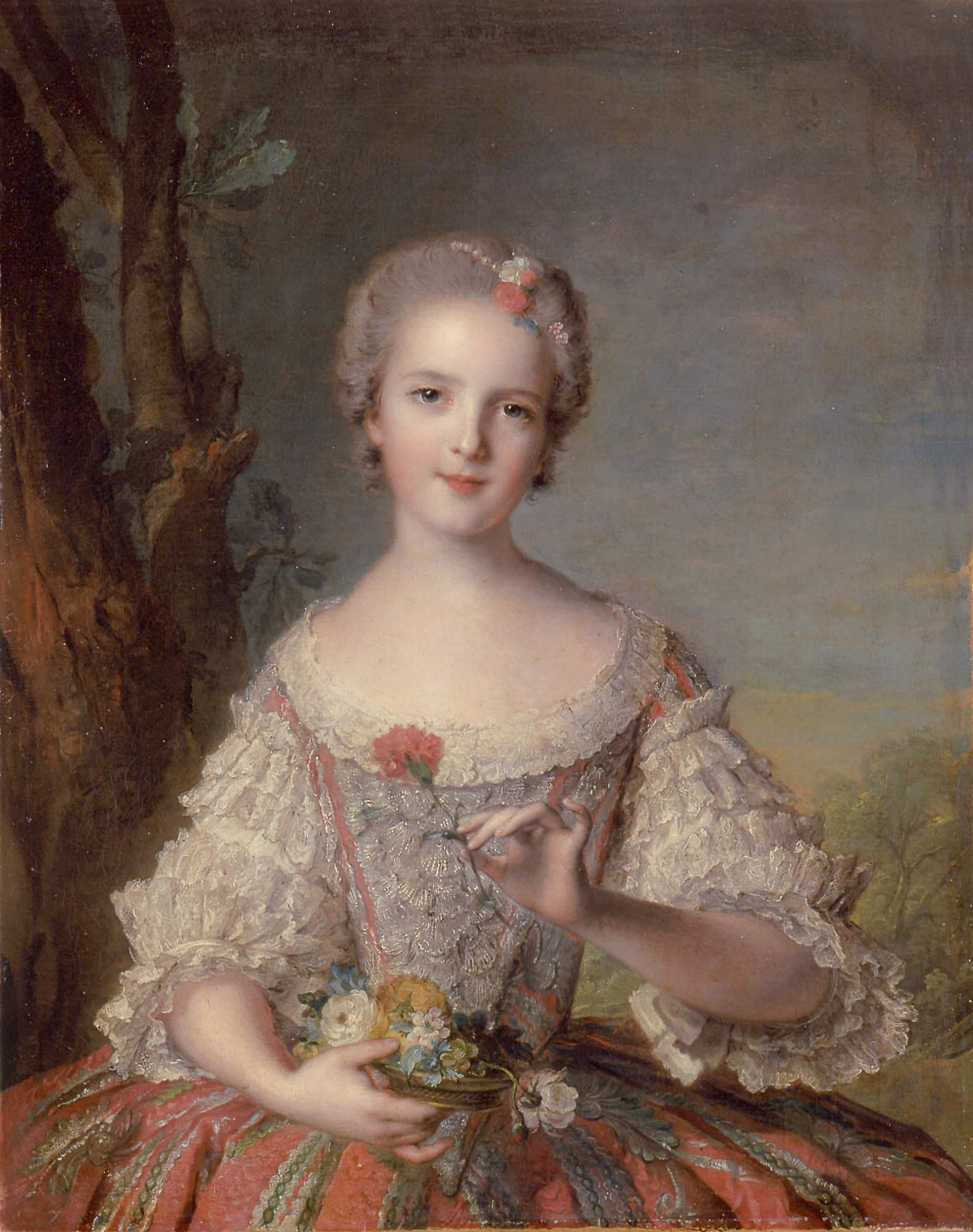
Louise Marie of France

=== At Versailles ===
To economise on their maintenance at court, and to prevent the queen (to whom a large, allied brood would give comfort) from having too much influence, the last four of the princesses were raised far from the court, at Poitou in the Fontevraud Abbey from 1738 to 1750, where they passed their formative years before returning to Versailles. Madame Thérèse did not return to Versailles, and Madame Louise came back, but was very strongly influenced by the monastic life, to which she later returned at Carmel de Saint-Denis.

The king kept the eldest one at his side; he was attached to her and separation made him very sad. Madame Adélaïde owed her maintenance at Versailles to her wishes and her successful request to remain near the king, whom she knew how to influence.

Mesdames, together with the Dauphin, sustained a long battle against the successive mistresses of their father, particularly Madame de Pompadour, who they called amongst themselves "Maman putain" (Mama Whore). Their support of the cause of the devout was permanent, and the reason, for their entire tenure at court, for their difficult relation with the king, who only consented very late to let them occupy apartments on the ground floor of the main building at Versailles, the apartments which today bear their name.

Among them, Madame Adélaïde was the one that exercised the most political role at the court, managing her sisters after the death of Madame Henriette in 1752, and intriguing unceasingly in favor of her brother and for the reestablishment of moral order at court.

Upon the accession to the throne of her nephew, she cherished the hope of exercising an influence over him but was soon forced to realize that he would not give her the role she wished. Pushed away from power bit by bit, and representing the old court against the new generation, she increasingly retired with her sisters to the Château de Bellevue, which had been constructed for Madame de Pompadour. They finally obtained it and passed most of the last decade of the ancien régime there.

After the days of October 1789, Adélaïde and Victoire retired to Bellevue, from whence they fled, ending up, after much wandering, in Italy, where they spent the remainder of their days.
