= Louise of France =

French princess (1737–1787)

- Venerable
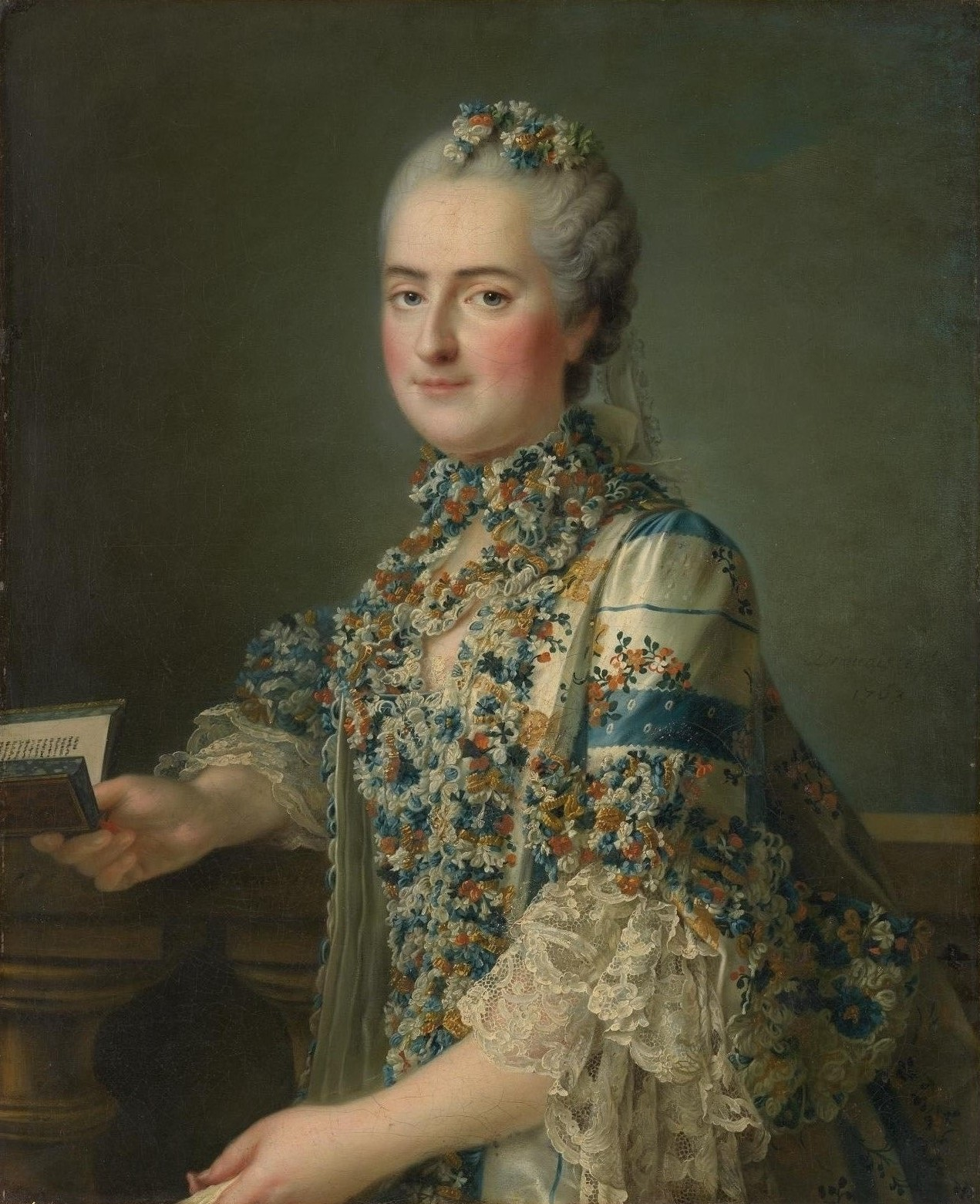
- Portrait by François-Hubert Drouais, c. 1763
- Born: 15 July 1737; Palace of Versailles, Versailles, France
- Died: 23 December 1787 (aged 50); Convent of Saint-Denis, France
- House: Bourbon
- Father: Louis XV
- Mother: Maria Leszczyńska
- Religion: Catholicism

- Coat of arms of the princesses of France

Louise of France, OCD (Louise-Marie; 15 July 1737 – 23 December 1787) was a French princess and Discalced Carmelite, the youngest of the ten children of King Louis XV and Queen Maria Leszczyńska. She entered the Carmelite convent at Saint-Denis in 1770 and took the religious name Thérèse of Saint-Augustin. She served as prioress in 1773–1779 and 1785–1787.

Her cause for canonisation was opened in 1902 and she was declared venerable by Pope John Paul II in 1997.

== Early life ==
=== Birth ===
Louise was born at the Palace of Versailles on 15 July 1737, exactly as predicted by the royal physicians. Her parents already had seven daughters and two sons before her, but one sister (Marie Louise) and one brother (Philippe, Duke of Anjou) had already died. As Salic law precluded women from inheriting the throne, Louis XV hoped for a “spare” son from this pregnancy. After the birth, he played a joke on the crowd gathered outside, announcing the birth of a son. The news spread and people celebrated with public feasts. The newborn's maternal grandfather, the deposed King Stanisław of Poland, prepared to travel to Versailles. By evening, the truth was clarified, and Stanisław stayed home. France and the royal court were saddened by the birth of another girl.

Daughters of the French king, known as filles de France, were referred to simply as madame and their given name. French royal children were baptised immediately upon birth with a simplified ceremony called ondoiement (performed by the Archbishop of Vienne for Louise). The baptism was completed a few years later, when godparents and given names were assigned. Until their full baptisms, Louis XV's daughters were known by numbers. Accordingly, Louise was called Madame Septième as his seventh (living) daughter.

An anecdote claims that the King announced that he and Queen Marie would have no more children by calling Louise Madame Dernière (“the last madame”). However, the historian Poignant argues that this story was invented and spread by the Marquis d'Argenson, known for his malignant rumours. Queen Marie Leszczyńska, when she learnt of her baby's gender, whispered to her husband in an exhausted voice, “I would suffer once more [and] just as much [to] give you a duke of Anjou”. Louis XV and France still hoped for a future son, but Louise was his last child.

=== Infancy in Versailles ===
The royal children lived in an apartment in the aile des Princes (“Wing of Princes”) of Versailles. They shared an antechamber and a cabinet for receiving visitors, where a private altar also stood. The walls and furniture were upholstered in red damask and covered with protective red serge outside of the most important ceremonies. The rooms were decorated with tapestries of mythological and historical scenes. There had been no changes made to the apartment since the time of Louis XIV's children and there were no personal touches added, except the dressing table, provided to each princess at birth and differing in design. That of Louise was upholstered in gold and silver brocade with colourful flowers and lined with green taffeta.

Just like her sisters, Louise had her own bedroom with three beds and a cradle. She shared this with her wet nurse, Madame Anne (d')Hoppen, one of the (sous-)gouvernantes (there was a chief gouvernante and two vice-gouvernantes), the remueuse or “[cradle] rocker”, who was tasked with dressing and bathing the baby, and two chambermaids (who shared one folding bed as one was always awake). Louise received a complete set of solid gold tableware, engraved enfans de France (children of France, with contemporary spelling) at her birth, used only on special occasions. Every item for personal use, including chamber pots, bore the same inscription. The ingredients of their breakfast porridge were brought in a sealed container, inspected, cooked publicly, and tasted first by the gouvernante.

Louise and her siblings were under the care of the gouvernante, Marie Isabelle de Rohan, Duchess of Tallard (Madame de Tallard), who was in charge of every aspect of their upbringing. Each princess was given a large retinue. A foreign visitor to the court recorded his amazement at seeing the princesses run around the palace always followed by at least fourteen people. Like all aspects of their lives, the relationship between the children and their parents was regulated by courtly etiquette, although the King did occasionally bend the rules in private. From the moment of birth, the children participated fully in courtly representation; their meals and their morning and night dressings were public for courtiers (as were those of their parents).

Shortly after Louise's birth, Chief Minister Cardinal de Fleury announced that the presence of so many little girls “embarrassed the court” and cost too much, as well as taking up valuable space that adult courtiers needed. Except for the three eldest, (eleven-year-old Madame, Louise-Élisabeth, whose engagement was being negotiated, her twin Madame Henriette, and six-year-old Madame Troisième, later Madame Adélaïde), the princesses were thus sent to a convent. The Queen opposed the decision, but she was too afraid of her husband and his powerful minister to challenge it.

=== Childhood at Fontevraud Abbey ===
Louise was not yet one year old when, on 16 June 1738, she was sent to far-away Fontevraud Abbey with her three elder sisters: five-year-old Victoire, four-year-old Sophie, and two-year-old Thérèse (known as Madame Quatrième, Madame Cinquième, and Madame Sixième, as they had not yet been baptised). Louis XV was away at Rambouillet for a day of hunting; his emotional reaction to the separation from his daughters is unknown. Louise shared a carriage with one of their sous-gouvernantes, Jeanne Françoise de Biaudos de Castéjá, Madame de La Lande and two chambermaids. They were followed by eight coaches, two chaises, twenty wagons of luggage, and members of the royal bodyguard. Louise's wet nurse, Madame Hoppen, accompanied her. The total retinue of the four girls consisted of 120 people and 200 horses. Civilians along the way were obligated to provide lodging and necessities.

The sisters arrived in Fontevraud on 28 June amidst a cheering crowd, received by a guard of honour of local gendarms. A feast was held for more than two hundred guests, with illuminations and fireworks. The next day, Madame de La Lande returned to Versailles and responsibility for the princesses was handed over to the abbess, Louise Françoise de Rochechouart de Mortemart. In late 1739, renovations started on a building known as the Logis-Bourbon (“Bourbon residence”) near the abbey, built by Éléonore de Bourbon, aunt of King Henry IV. It was extended with a new wing and a private chapel for the princesses, but they could only move there in 1741.

For three years during the renovations, Victoire and Sophie lived in the abbess' apartment and Thérèse and Louise in a neighbouring, badly maintained house. The poor living conditions may have contributed to a serious illness Sophie, Thérèse, and Louise suffered in late 1738. The youngest was so ill that the abbess ordered her baptism on 20 December, which is when she received the name Louise Marie. The cermony took place in the local parish church of Saint Michael, and the sick girl was placed under the Virgin Mary's special protection, dedicated to wear white for a year. The Queen remarked on the illness in a personal letter, identifying it as dysentery, adding that “one has but pains in this cruel world, but thank God, we are not made to stay here”. As an adult, Louise remained fond of the church where she had been christened, received her first communion, and was confirmed, and where she and her sisters celebrated Easter every year (ordinarily, they heard mass in their private chapel). In 1755, the princesses donated a painting of Saint Joseph and the Christ Child to the church.

The princesses were raised primarily by two nuns, Sister Mac Carthy and Sister Françoise Paris de Soulange, the latter being the most beloved by them. They were also each assigned one nun as a personal gouvernante. Sometimes, they were subjected to harsh punishments, such as being shut into a burial crypt alone, which caused Madame Victoire to suffer from lifelong panic attacks. They were never visited by any of their relatives, including their parents.

Three teachers are known to have been appointed for the girls at Fontevraud: Abbot Piers, a legal scholar, who, however, died in November 1738; Monsieur de Caix, one of the royal musicians; and a dancing master. The memoirs of Madame Campan claim that by the age of twelve, Louise had not yet learnt the alphabet fully, which her biographer Stryenski dismisses based on the existence of her signatures from the time. She was considered intelligent from a young age and she enjoyed mocking others and herself (as did her father and her brother).

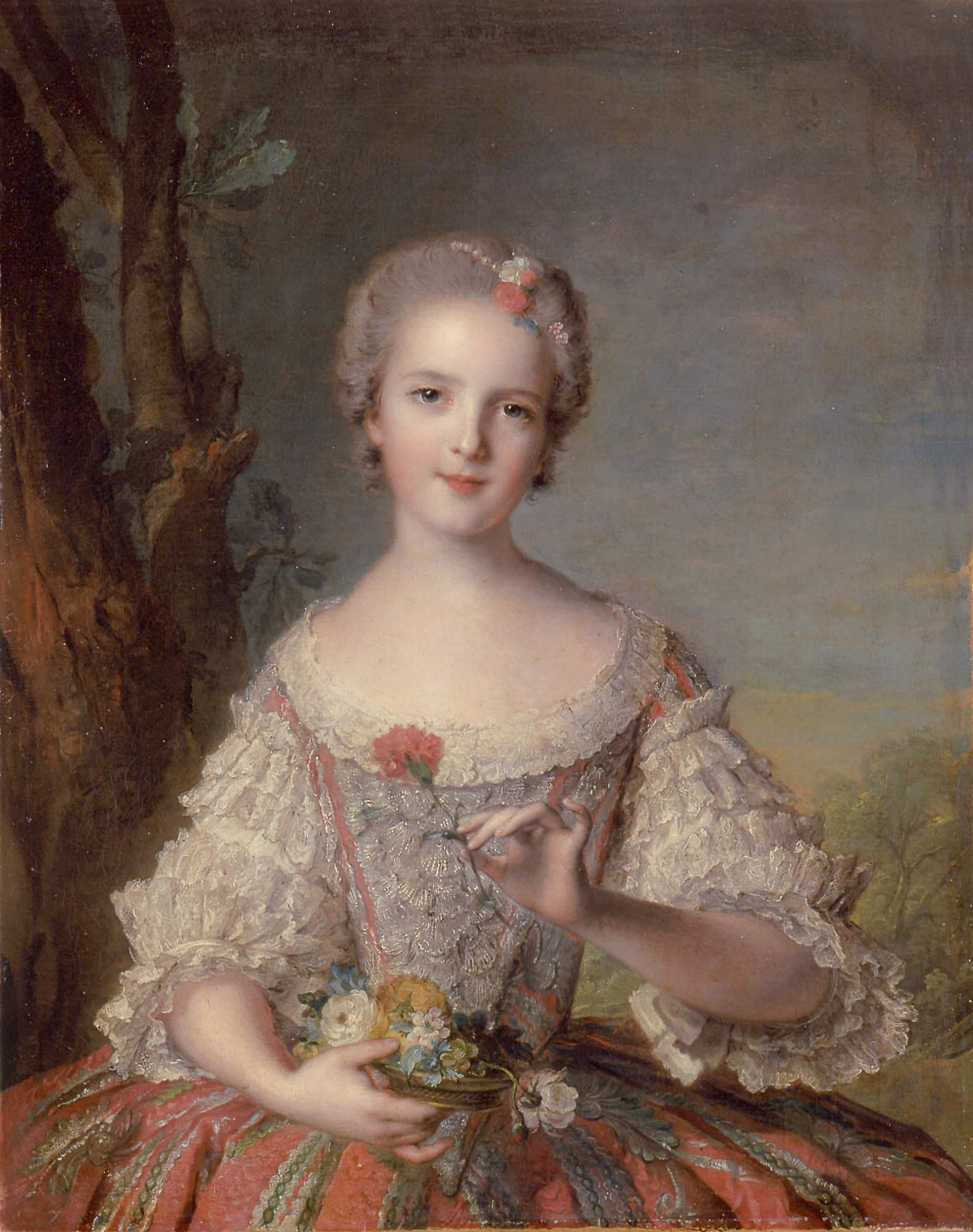
Madame Louise de France by Jean-Marc Nattier, 1748. This portrait was commissioned by Madame de Pompadour, and was sent to Louise's parents in October 1748

In September 1744, the sister closest to her in age, Thérèse, died of smallpox. In September 1747, the King commissioned paintings by Jean-Marc Nattier of the three surviving girls as a surprise for his wife. Commenting on the painting, the Queen said that she had “never seen anything so pleasant as [Louise]: her face is heart-warming and very far removed from sadness; [she had] not seen one so singular; [Louise] is moving, gentle, and spiritual”. As a child, she was also haughty and expected special treatment and courtly etiquette from the nuns. According to anecdotes, she demanded that people rise when she entered a room or when she drank, commanding,“Stand, ladies! Louise drinks.” The Abbess, Madame de Soulanges, responded, “Remain seated!” When a maid did not behave humbly enough in her presence, young Louise asked, “Am I not the daughter of your king?”. The woman replied, apparently upon the instruction of Madame de Soulanges, “And I, madam, am I not the daughter of your God?” Louise and her friends later credited the nuns with curbing her pride and teaching her a humble religious outlook.

As a child, Louise was afraid that she was unworthy of God's love, and felt fearful because of her first communion, wondering if she was ready for it. The ceremony nevertheless took place on 21 November 1748, the feast of Candlemas, when she was twelve. Louise went on to cherish the memory of this religious union with God, as she described in her Eucharistic Meditations: “I longed for nothing more than the moment of receiving you [God] there [in the sacrament]”.

During her time in Fontevraud, Louise might have had an accident: waiting for her chambermaid in the morning, she climbed on the railings of her bed and fell down. Whatever the cause, at some point, she developed a “hump” (as she called it). She perhaps inherited the congenital scoliosis running in the Bourbon family. Throughout her childhood, her health was frail.

In 1748, when Louise, aged eleven, was still in Fontevraud, rumors began to circulate that her father intended her to marry Prince Charles Edward Stuart, pretender to the throne of England. Louise then declared, "I do not worry about being good for a husband, I, who desire no other than Jesus Christ".

== Adulthood in Versailles ==
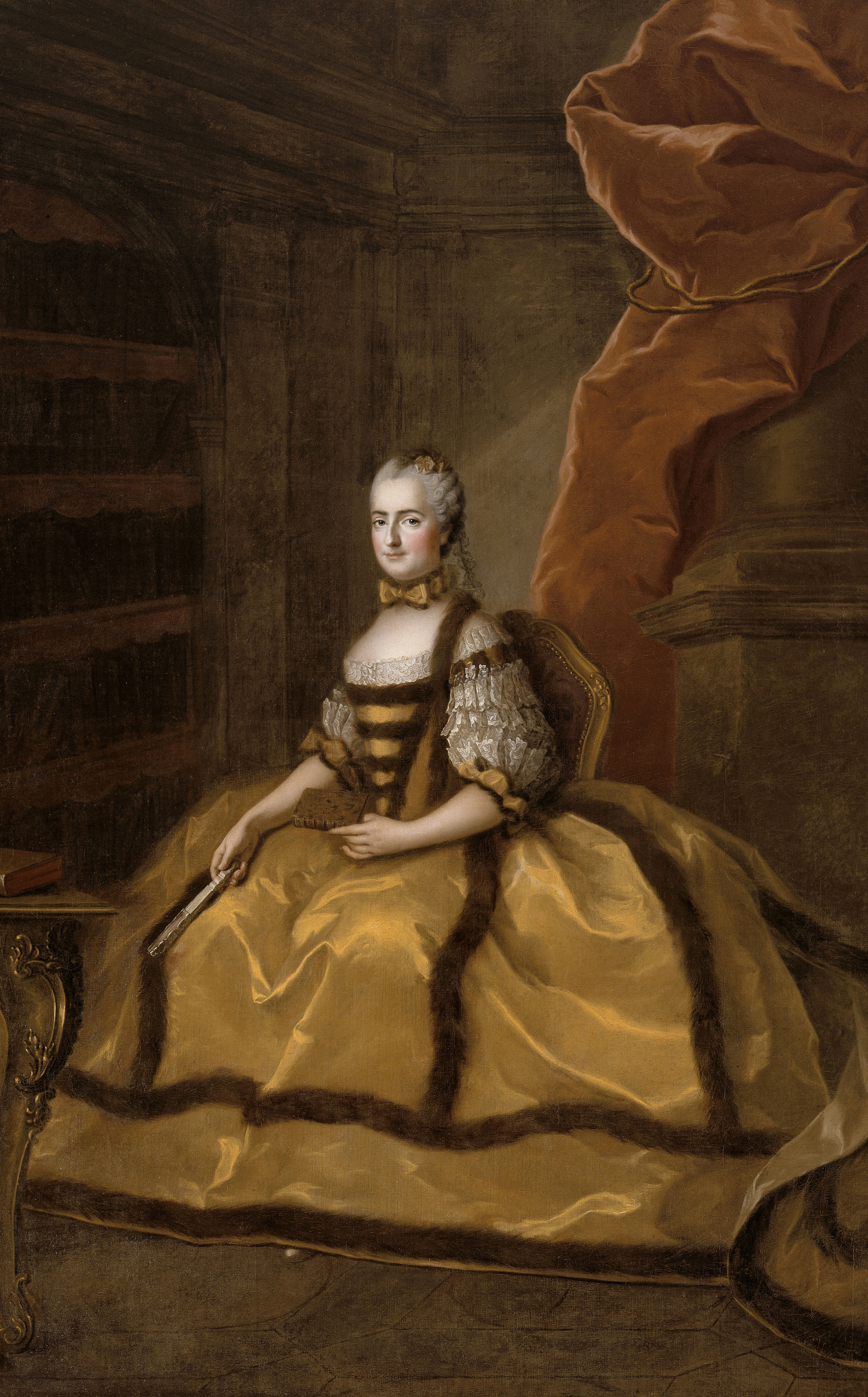
Madame Louise by Drouais, ca. 1770

In early 1748, fifteen-year-old Madame Victoire became “bored” with living at Fontevraud and petitioned her father to be allowed to return to Versailles. After some hesitation, the King allowed her to do so. In November 1750, Sophie and Louise followed suit. Compared to Victoire, who was considered “extremely pretty” and amusing in conversation, Sophie and Louise were less of a success. Sophie was very shy and socially awkward, while Louise's health was weak. According to a contemporary, “her head was a little too big for her body”, apart from her visible spinal disease. Her father's mistress, Madame de Pompadour described her as “very short, not at all shapely, [with] features that are more bad than good, but with that a delicate appearance that is more appealing than if she were beautiful”. The Duke of Luynes, in his diary, agreed that Louise was “undoubtedly short, but with a lot of character”.

Among the princesses, only the eldest, Louise-Élisabeth married, becoming duchess of Parma. Louise only met her on Louise-Élisabeth's second visit to Versailles in 1752, and she died of smallpox in 1759, on another visit to France. Louise-Élisabeth's twin, Henriette, had died in 1752 of the same disease, leaving four princesses in Versailles: Adélaïde, simply called “Madame”, Madame Victoire, Madame Sophie, and Madame Louise, known collectively as Mesdames de France. The King referred to them by nicknames: he called Adélaïde Logue (“Dud/Tatters”), Victoire “Coche” (“Piggy”), Sophie “Graille” (“Scrap/Mite”), and Louise “Chiffe” or “Chiffie” (“Rag/Rubbish”).

Mesdames were led by Adélaïde, considered “masculine” in behaviour and impulsive with changeable moods, but also physically beautiful. She had a strong personality, reinforced by the fact that, after the death of Madame Henriette, she became the senior princess. Mesdames were free to do as they pleased, without their parents' interference. In their first years at court, they only socialised with a small, select group of people. They aligned themselves politically with the conservative Queen Marie and their brother Louis, the Dauphin, supporting the power of the Catholic church and the supremacy of the royal court over the parlement of Paris. They travelled from palace to palace with the court and participated in representation. Louise was an excellent and admired horse rider, who often accompanied her father on his hunts.

While the timid Victoire and Sophie accepted the dominance of Adélaïde, Louise, considered more intelligent than any of them, struggled. A “fiery and passionate” person, she spent her first years in Versailles with enjoying the luxuries of the court, indulging in straining exercise, food, and dresses. In these early years, she was seen as “the most wordly, beyond comparison” of Mesdames, described as “very pretty, cheerful, and witty”. Adèle d'Osmond, Madame de Boigne claims in her memoirs that when she heard that Louise had left Versailles at night (to join a convent), she asked, “With whom?”, implying that she may have eloped with a man.

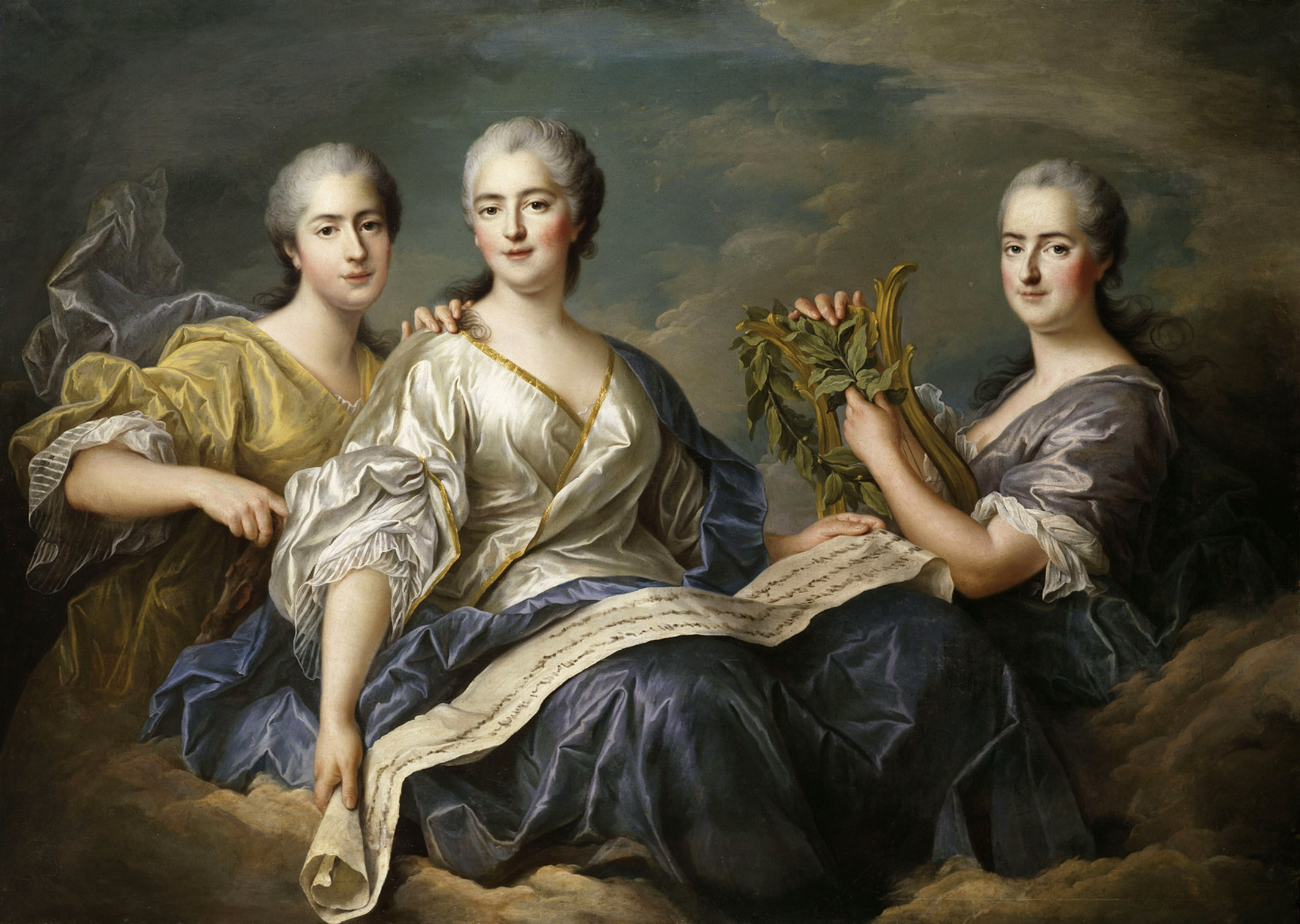
Mesdames Sophie, Victoire, and Louise on a portrait after an original by François-Hubert Drouais.

Mesdames grew close to their only living brother, the Dauphin Louis, who encouraged them to pursue meaningful hobbies, including painting and music. They lived a shared life of luxury, especially enjoying good food: their apartment was always filled with sausages, sweets, and Spanish wines. While their education had been neglected in the convent (Louise claimed that they did not learn to read fluently until they were already living in Versailles), the sisters compensated by studying extensively after their return, spending almost all of their time on education with the support of their brother. Mesdames practiced spelling and grammar, studied history and mathematics, and learnt Italian and English. Apart from their studies, they had little to do. They enjoyed walking and gardening, but could only do the former in the Versailles gardens and the latter on their windowsills. Louise lived in “great seclusion” for the latter years of her life in Versailles. She was the favourite sister of Madame Victoire.

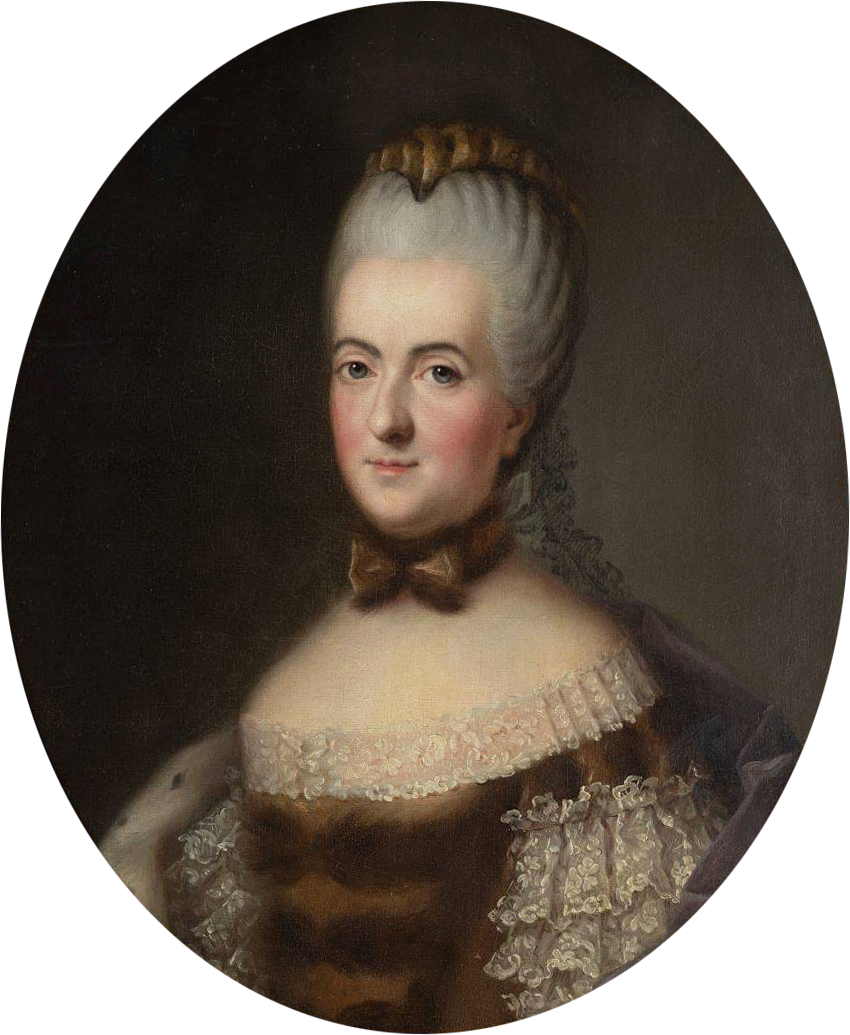
Undated portrait of Madame Louise by Drouais.

In July 1761, Adélaïde and Victoire went to Lorraine for a spa cure, while Sophie and Louise visited Paris for the first time, signalling a change in their degree of influence. By this time, the King had started to listen to their advice in governance, especially to Adélaïde, who received an apartment near his to enable continuous communication. Emboldened, Adélaïde started to treat her younger sisters as her inferiors. Her rule ended with the 1764 installation of Madame du Barry as the maîtresse-en-titre who overtook her apartment and stayed the King's confidant until his death.

According to their reader, Henriette Campan, Mesdames rarely saw their father. He visited the apartment of Madame Adélaïde every morning, who rang a bell to alert Madame Victoire; Victoire did the same of Sophie, and Sophie for Louise. As their apartments were “of very large dimensions”, Louise often barely had time to greet the King, despite running as fast as she could with her disability. In addition, every day at 6 p.m., the princesses attended the King's débotter (the ceremony of taking off his boots). For this, they wore ornate skirts on a hoop and a black taffeta coat to cover their otherwise non-ceremonial dress and went in a procession of attendants to the royal apartments. At the débotter, the King kissed each daughter on the forehead. This meeting was so short that Mesdames could often resume their usual activities within fifteen minutes. In the summer, he sometimes also visited them shortly before the débotter. Although the time they could spend together was short, the King (whom his daughters called papa-roi, papa-king) and Mesdames enjoyed being together and strove to be tender to each other. The Queen showed little outward affection to anyone, but she said about her youngest daughter that “I not only love Louise, I respect her”. Louise admired her mother's deep religiosity and dutifulness.

== Life as a Carmelite ==
=== Background of the decision ===
By 1762, Louise had decided to join the Carmelite order, a community her mother liked. In 1751, she had participated in the vow-taking ceremony of Madame de Rupelmonde, a courtier who became a Carmelite after losing her husband, son, and father, but she doubted for a long time whether she was strong enough to endure the rigours of Carmelite life. She nevertheless focussed on her spiritual life by writing a diary of her religious journey, following the liturgical year, meditating on the events of the lives of Christ and the saints on related feast days and examining her conscience. In 1752, the death of her sister Henriette, whom people considered saintly, made a great impression on her: she observed it was “sweet” to die as peacefully and religiously as Henriette had, but feared that her life did not make her worthy of such an end. She increasingly found court life to be a tedious and frustrating round of social occasions which she attended out of obligation, and which distracted her from religion.

Behold the bondage in which I find myself, the unrest in which I live, my interrupted prayers, my disrupted meditations, my thwarted devotions; behold the worldly affairs that assail me […] Oh, my good Mother [Teresa of Ávila], what more is needed? My days are slipping away, my years are passing; alas! What will I have left to offer God? […] Open the door to your house for me at last, oh, my Mother […] I need all your help to declare myself to the one whose consent I require…

— Madame Louise of France, excerpts from Novena to Saint Theresa, Eucharistic Meditations,

A series of events in the late 1760s led to a crisis for Louise. She was deeply affected by the banishment of the Jesuits from France and resolved to secure their return, as well as the conversion of the King from his dissolute lifestyle. This was followed by the death of her brother the Dauphin in 1765, her maternal grandfather Stanisław Leszczyński in 1766, her sister-in-law, Dauphine Maria Josepha of Saxony in 1767, and her mother Queen Marie in 1768. This arrival of Madame du Barry in 1769 finally pushed Louise to ask his confidant and spiritual advisor, Christophe de Beaumont, Archbishop of Paris to intercede on her behalf with the King so he would permit her to enter the Discalced Carmelites, a cloistered and austere religious order. The Archbishop informed the King of his daughter's vocation on 30 January 1770, disturbing the father, who repeatedly said, “this is cruel”, but adding, “if God asks her, I cannot refuse her”. On 16 February 1771, he finally responded in a letter: “If this is for God only, I cannot oppose his will and your desire […] I embrace you with all my heart, dear daughter, and give you my blessing”.

Apart from spiritual motivations, becoming a nun allowed Louise to achieve more prominence and influence. Her status as youngest princess and her physical disabilities were a hindrance at court, but she could stand out by becoming a Carmelite. Madame Campan later recalled that Louise believed happiness could only be found far from the royal court, “in the contemplation of a better world”. Madame Campan believed that Louise chose the cloistered life because she was attracted to all things “sublime” and this renunciation was the only “brilliant action” available to her. The words, “I Carmelite, and the King all to God”, reflected Louise's willingness to redeem her father's soul with her sacrifice and atone for his sins.

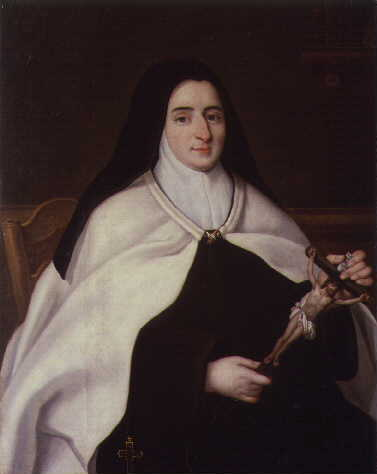
Louise as Thérèse of Saint-Augustine, portrait from around 1771.

Even before becoming a Carmelite, Louise had begun to secretly wear religious dress and live according to convent rules. This was at the same time as the court prepared for the marriage of her nephew, the new Dauphin (the future Louis XVI) and Archduchess Maria Antonia of Austria. Louise, like her sisters, was opposed to the future French king marrying an Austrian archduchess. The union had been arranged by Chief Minister Choiseul, who had exiled Jesuits. Although Mesdames pretended to receive Marie Antoinette kindly, they secretly undermined her wherever possible, jealous of her superior rank. This included Louise, but unlike her sisters, her religious status protected her from becoming unpopular because of it.

Madame Campan later remembered that one evening in April 1770, while she was reading to Madame Louise, a message came that Minister Bertin would speak with her. Louise briefly left to speak with him, then came back to continue her embroidery and the reading. The next morning, when Madame Campan returned to Louise's apartment to resume service, she was informed that Louise had left at seven in the morning for a convent, accompanied only by a maid, Madame de Guistel, and an equerry. Louise was already expected in the convent, arriving at the grille to prove that the King had authorised her decision.

Louise chose to enter the Carmelite convent at Saint-Denis, one of the poorest communities in the order, near the burial site of the French royal family. Threatened with closure because of their limited financial resources, the convent was unexpectedly saved by the arrival of a woman with a large dowry, and the nuns received her as the answer to their prayers. Her hasty departure created a great surprise at court. Adélaïde had “violent” outbursts of “rage”, blaming their father for keeping Louise's secret, while Victoire cried silently. In her memoirs, Madame de Boigne claims that her sisters never forgave Louise for keeping her decision a secret, and “though they went to see her sometimes, it was with no feelings of pleasure or friendship. Her death was no grief to them.” During Holy Week, the royal family visited Louise at the convent. In May 1770, she wrote to a friend that she had “not been able to contain the joy that filled [her] heart” since her arrival. Around this time, Madame Campan also visited Louise, who had just washed the convent's linen. She said to Campan, “I much abused your youthful lungs for two years before the execution of my project” (Louise had made Madame Campan read to her for up to five hours a day), adding, “I knew that here [in the convent] I could read none but books tending to our salvation, and I wished to review all the historians that had interested me”.

On 10 September 1770, she took the veil in a ceremony celebrated by a nuncio and attended by her entire family. Louise was wearing a white satin gown and expensive diamond jewellery. The new Dauphine, Marie Antoinette of Austria gave her the veil. Louise asked that her cell be more austerely furnished than usual even for Carmelites. The sermon delivered at the occasion was published, uncommonly for France, highlighting the sensational nature of this event. Catholics all over France celebrated Louise's decision. She reluctantly accepted some accommodations to help her integrate into a rigorous life. For example, she was allowed to use a rope to guide herself when using the narrow stairs, which she had never done before without assistance.

She took her final religious vows on 11 September 1771. This was followed by a large public ceremony the next day, attended by around twenty bishops and the royal family. The black veil of the Carmelites was given to her by another niece-in-law, Marie Joséphine of Savoy, Countess of Provence, and bestowed upon her in a very formal ceremony. With her investiture, Louise chose the name Thérèse of Saint-Augustin in honor of Teresa of Ávila, a mystic and reformer of the Carmelite Order.

=== Mistress of novices and convent treasurer ===
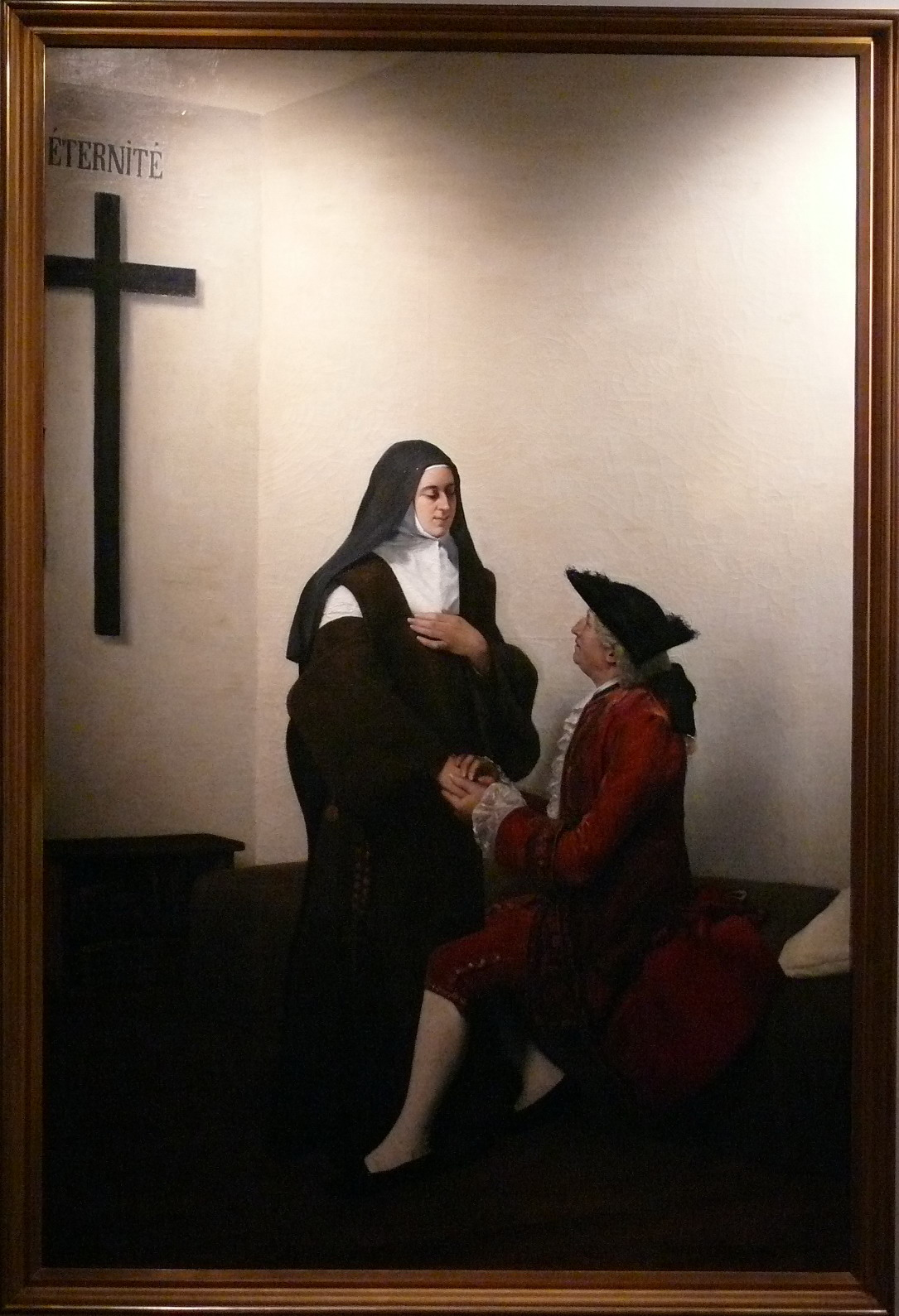
Louis XV visiting his youngest daughter, by Maxime Le Boucher, 1882.

The day after taking her final vows, Louise was appointed mistress of novices, overseeing thirteen young women. She was beloved and appreciated by the novices for her guidance. By the end of 1771, Louise was made dépositaire (treasurer), entrusted with the finances of the convent. She carried out this role for a long time and actively.

Between 1779 and 1785, she oversaw the rebuilding of the ruined church under Richard Mique, giving precise instructions on structural work and decoration. She opposed work on Sundays and feast days, requiring a written promise from Mique not to build then. Before Mique did so, Louise told the hired labourers that if they worked on holy days, “they would be doing so for the glory of God, and that [she] knew to keep the strings of the purse well enough that assuredly their profanation would not be paid”.

In the convent, her health was much better than it had been in Versailles, apart from the occasional cold and attacks of gout. She fit in well, happy to serve the others and nurse sick nuns, but she also participated in their small amusements, such as poem writing or embroidery.

=== Prioress ===
Louise was elected prioress of the convent on 25 November 1773. She served for two consecutive temrs from 1773 to 1779, and during a third term from 1785. Her decision to retire from court made her a great asset for the clergy, who were constantly petitioning her. Louise used her influence with the King to secure ecclesiastical positions for those she supported. In general, she used her power as a former princess to help the conservative Catholic cause, such as fighting Jansenism (one of the greatest theological debates in France at the time). She worked to re-convert nuns who had embraced Jansenist doctrine. Being a sincere traditionalist, she blamed the Enlightenment philosophers for the spread of “impiety”.

When Louis XV lay dying in 1774, Mesdames laboured to convince him to confess his sins and repudiate Madame du Barry as a sign of his repentance. Louise prayed in support of them in the convent and the goal was achieved. On 26 May, two weeks after Louis XV's death, his grandson, the new king Louis XVI visited his aunt at Saint-Denis. Reportedly, Louise continued to solicit favours for others during the reign of her nephew, to the degree that Queen Marie Antoinette supposedly said to Madame de Boigne, “Here is another letter from my Aunt Louise. She is certainly the most intriguing little Carmelite in the kingdom.” When the interest of the Carmelite order was at stake, she readily corresponded with worldly powers and used her royal influence. She was also active in charity. In June 1782, she gave assistance to thirteen Carmelite nuns expelled from Brussels by Emperor Joseph II.

After Louis XVI's accession, Louise was often visited by her niece Madame Élisabeth, who wished to unite her prayers with that of her aunt for the king's welfare. An anecdote is given about one such visit: “Mme Elizabeth arrived at the convent one day quite early, and begged to be allowed to wait on the nuns at their dinner. Leave being granted, she put on an apron and, after kissing the ground, went to the Tour to receive the dishes. All went well, till, as she was distributing the portions, the tray slipped and a dish fell. Her embarrassment was extreme. To relieve her, the august Princess [Louise] said, ‘My niece. After such a gaucherie the culprit should kiss the floor.’ This Mme Elizabeth hastened to do, and then cheerfully resumed her office of waitress.” It was rumoured that Élisabeth may wish to join her aunt in the convent, but Louise herself refuted this, although she acknowledged it would make her happy, as being a nun was “the happiest state”. In 1783, aged 46, she described herself to the prioress of the Brussels Carmelite convent: “Your servant is very short, [has] a big head, high forehead, black eyebrows, blue-grey-brown eyes, [a] long, hooked nose, [a] cleft chin, [is] fat as a ball and hunchbacked”.

In November 1787, Louis XVI allowed Protestants to openly practice their religion, granting them legal and civil status by the Edict of Versailles. Louise, who believed this to be a betrayal of the King's coronation promise to safeguard the Catholic faith, sent him an eight-page letter of protest, attacking Protestants and admonishing the King.

=== Death ===
Thérèse of Saint Augustin died on 23 December 1787 in the convent at Saint-Denis after suffering from a stomach complaint. Her last words were, according to a fellow Carmelite nun, “Au paradis ! Vite ! Au grand galop !” (“To paradise! Quickly! With full speed!”) Her nephew Louis XVI commented to Madame Campan that in the “delirium” of dying, Louise must have remembered that she had been born a princess. There was no official court mourning for her.

A little over a year later, the French Revolution deposed her family and ousted the Catholic Church from power in France. In the last days of Madame Élisabeth's imprisonment before her execution, she received a biography written about the late Louise by Abbot Proyart, who had known her. The buildings of the convent at Saint Denis survived the turmoil and today house the Musée d'art et d'histoire de Saint-Denis. However, in 1793 the revolutionaries who desecrated the tombs of the kings of France at the Basilica of St Denis did the same to the cemetery of the Carmelite convent. Located near the cloister, the remains of the royal family were disinterred and thrown into a mass grave.

It is four years [ago] on the 23^{rd} of this month [December] that my pious aunt, Madame Louise, died in peace, tenderly cared for by her dear Carmelites. How merciful God was to her in calling her to Him on the eve of the disasters and misfortunes which were about to fall on her family and her convent itself [the Revolution]. She lived in peace and she died very happy. It was for that reason, no doubt, that the Court did not go into mourning for her.

— Madame Élisabeth of France, letter to Charlotte Hélène de Saisseval, Madame de Lastic,

== Cause of beatification and canonization ==
Venerable Thérèse of Saint Augustine OCD
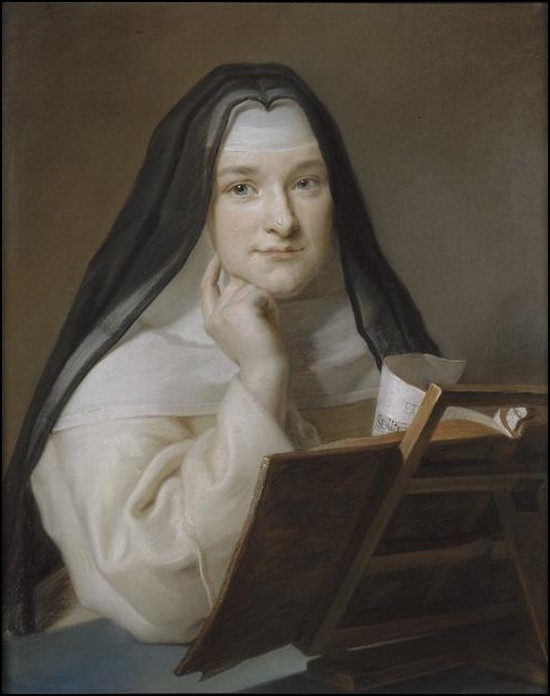
- Princess Louise of France in her religious habit, ca. 18th-century
- Born: Louise-Marie; 15 July 1737; Palace of Versailles, Kingdom of France
- Hometown: Versailles
- Residence: Palace of Versailles, Convent of Saint Denis
- Died: 23 December 1787; Convent of Saint Denis
- Resting place: Basilica of Saint Denis (until 1792)

The process of Thérèse de Saint-Augustine's beatification took place between 1855 and 1867. Her cause was formally opened on 16 December 1902, granting her the title of Servant of God. The process (required at the time) of non-cult took place in 1885–1886. The process of sanctity was conducted in 1891–1892 and the process of the virtues from 1896 to 1904. The decree validating these processes was published on 28 November 1906.

Clerics resumed steps toward Thérèse's canonization in Rome under new protocols on 13 December 1985. An association was founded in January 1986 to support the cause of her beatification. The decree of the heroic virtues of Thérèse of Saint Augustine was published on 18 December 1997, declaring her venerable. Only lack of an officially recognised miracle attributed to her is lacking for her to be declared “Blessed”.

== Quotes ==
- “Accept, oh, my Beloved! Oh, most lovable of Spouses! Accept this heart that burns to be yours. You have so many claims to its possession! Reign alone and reign for ever over my soul and all its faculties, over my will and all its affections, over my body and all its senses […] May my memory be occupied with nothing but the recollection of your good deeds; may my mind make the meditation on your lovely qualities its dearest occupation; may my heart be filled with nothing but the ineffable ardour with which you burn here for me. May my whole body be purified by the approach of your adorable flesh; may it sacrifice itself for your glory, through labour and infirmity, and may its sole endeavours, its most constant aspirations, be to imitate you and to become like you.” (A Conversation with Our Lord in the Blessed Sacrament, for the Octave of Corpus Christi; Eucharistic Meditations)
- “Anything that does not come from God cannot be good, and scruples do not come from him. Let us cultivate not a broad conscience, but a peaceful one.” (Advice to Novices)
- “All my sisters have made greater sacrifices to God than I have, for they sacrificed their freedom to Him, whereas I was a slave at Court; and my chains, though more glittering, were no less chains for that.” (Spiritual Testimonies)
- “My daughter, when we have to endure something more trying than usual—whether because of the way of life we have chosen, or because of the changing seasons—let us remember what Jesus Christ suffered for us; let us picture that immense weight of glory in which he wishes us to share, and the comparison of which with the heaviest burden we have to bear in this world is so effective in making it seem insignificant.”(Spiritual Testimonies)

== Ancestry ==
Ancestors of Louise of France

8. Louis, Dauphin of France
4. Louis, Duke of Burgundy
9. Maria Anna Victoria of Bavaria
2. Louis XV of France
10. Victor Amadeus II of Sardinia
5. Marie Adélaïde of Savoy
11. Anne Marie of Orléans
1. Louise of France
12. Rafał Leszczyński
6. Stanisław I Leszczyński
13. Anna Jabłonowska
3. Marie Leszczyńska
14. Jan Karol Opaliński
7. Katarzyna Opalińska
15. Zofia Czarnkowska

== Bibliography ==
- Calvimont, Victorine de. Mme Louise de France, carmélite. Bourdeaux: Ragot, 1855.
- De la Brière, Léon. Madame Louise de France . Paris: Victor Retaux, 1900.
- Hours, Bernard. Madame Louise, Princesse au Carmel. Paris: Cerf, 1987.
- Poignant, Simone (1970). Les Filles de Louis XV: L'Aile des Princes [The Daughters of Louis XV: The Wing of Princes] (in French). Arthaud – via Internet Archive.
- Proyart, Abbé. Vie de Madame Louise de France, Religieuse Carmélite, dédiée a Madame Elisabeth, Sœur du Roi Louis XVI. Par M. l'Abbé Proyart, de plusieurs Académies. Brussels: Chez Le Charlier, Libraire, 1793. Proyart's authoritative biography drew upon recollections of the Princess’ closest friends, including Madame Élisabeth, her niece. However, before completing his work Proyart was forced to flee the Revolution and hence first published his work in Belgium (first edition: 1788).
- Stryenski, Casimir (1911). Mesdames de France, filles de Louis XV. Documents inédits (in French). Paris: Émile-Paul – via Internet Archive.
