= Thérèse of France =

French princess (1736–1744)

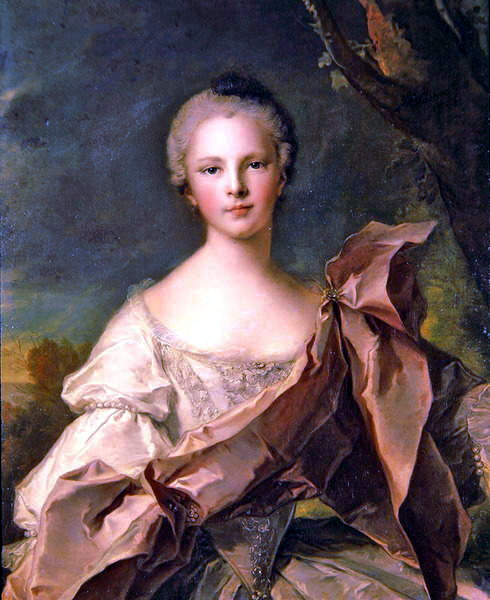
- Posthumous portrait by Jean-Marc Nattier. The dark sky and black veil on her hair may symbolize death.
- Born: 16 May 1736; Palace of Versailles, Versailles, Kingdom of France
- Died: 28 September 1744 (aged 8); Royal Abbey of Fontevraud, Fontevraud-l'Abbaye, Kingdom of France
- Burial: Royal Abbey of Fontevraud, Fontevraud-l'Abbaye, Kingdom of France
Names
- Marie Thérèse Félicité de France
- House: Bourbon
- Father: Louis XV
- Mother: Marie Leszczyńska

Thérèse de France (Marie Thérèse Félicité; 16 May 1736 – 28 September 1744) was a French princess, a fille de France, as the daughter of King Louis XV and Queen Marie Leszczyńska.

== Biography ==
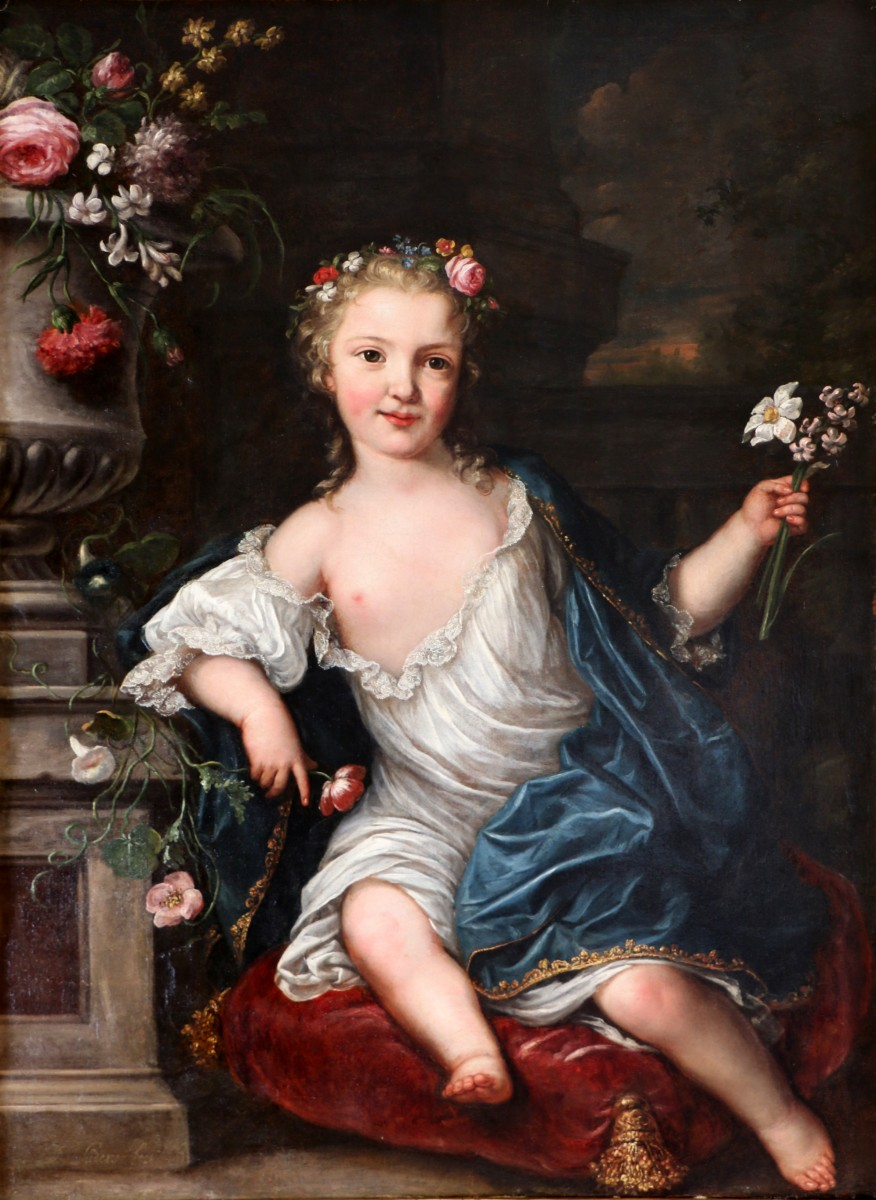
Possible posthumous portrait of Princess Thérèse, by David Luders

Princess Marie Thérèse Félicité of France was born at the Palace of Versailles in France. She was the seventh daughter and ninth child of King Louis XV and his Polish-born consort Marie Leszczyńska. Known as Madame Sixième from her birth, she was later baptised Marie-Thérèse-Félicité and was known as Madame Thérèse.

As the daughter of a king of France, she was a fille de France (daughter of France). This rank allowed her the style of Royal Highness, and she was the most important lady at court after her mother and her elder sisters. However, daughters of the king were usually known as Madame followed by their baptismal name. In the case of Louis XV's daughters, when they were young, their baptismal name was replaced by an ordinal number as per their "arrival"; accordingly, Madame Thérèse was Madame Sixième, as the sixth daughter.

When she was barely two years old, Thérése was taken to the Royal Abbey of Fontevraud in the Anjou province of France. This was done because Cardinal Fleury, the king's chief minister, thought that the cost of raising them in Versailles would be too expensive with all the luxuries they were entitled to. She left with her sisters Madame Victoire (1733–1799), Madame Sophie (1734–1782) and Madame Louise (1737–1787). The Queen protested and was saddened over their departure but Louis XV did not dare oppose the Cardinal's decision. Thus, by July 1738 their mother was no longer sharing a bed with their father. The princesses left Versailles on 6 June 1738, accompanied by furniture and a military escort.

During her childhood, Thérése was often ill, and her governess noted that it was probably due to the warm climate of the region. Duke de Luynes noted that she resembled her maternal grandfather King Stanislas I of Poland. As she grew, the princess was described as having a gentle personality and a pious and reflective outlook on life. This made her much loved by her attendants at Fontevraud and by the Queen and her elder siblings as they were sent regular reports. Her mother Queen Marie was forbidden multiple times from seeing her daughters in Fontevraud by the Cardinal Fleury and later by their own father Louis XV, as he deemed the two weeks' travel time too expensive. Thus the depressed Queen resorted to regularly sending them gifts and writing to them. In mid-September 1744 as her father Louis XV was also sick and thought to be dying at Metz, Thérése fell ill with smallpox. This happened during the height of the War of the Austrian Succession. Her mother and elder siblings were also at Metz that time after being summoned by the King. On 27 September, she was baptised with her nurse and valet standing in as godparents. She died the following day. The princess was eight years old and had not seen her parents since her arrival at Fontevraud Abbey. According to the memoirs of the Duke de Luynes, by the time the initial reports of Therese's illness reached Metz she had already died, as the travel time for the post was 20 days. The Queen was devastated by her daughter's death and she refused to see anyone that day, including the King whom she informed via letter. Louis XV was preoccupied at that time in winning back his mistress Marie Anne de Mailly.

Madame Thérèse was buried at the Abbey of Fontevraud, which, in earlier times, had been the traditional burial place of members of the House of Plantagenet. A Mass was held for her soul in Notre Dame de Paris in October 1744 with the King and Queen and her elder siblings in attendance.

== Ancestry ==
Ancestors of Thérèse of France

8. Louis, Dauphin of France
4. Louis, Duke of Burgundy
9. Maria Anna Victoria of Bavaria
2. Louis XV of France
10. Victor Amadeus II of Sardinia
5. Marie Adélaïde of Savoy
11. Anne Marie of Orléans
1. Thérèse of France
12. Rafał Leszczyński
6. Stanisław I of Poland
13. Anna Jabłonowska
3. Marie Leszczyńska
14. Jan Karol Opaliński
7. Katarzyna Opalińska
15. Zofia Czarnkowska
