= Sophie of France =

Duchess of Louvois (1734–1782)

- Duchess of Louvois
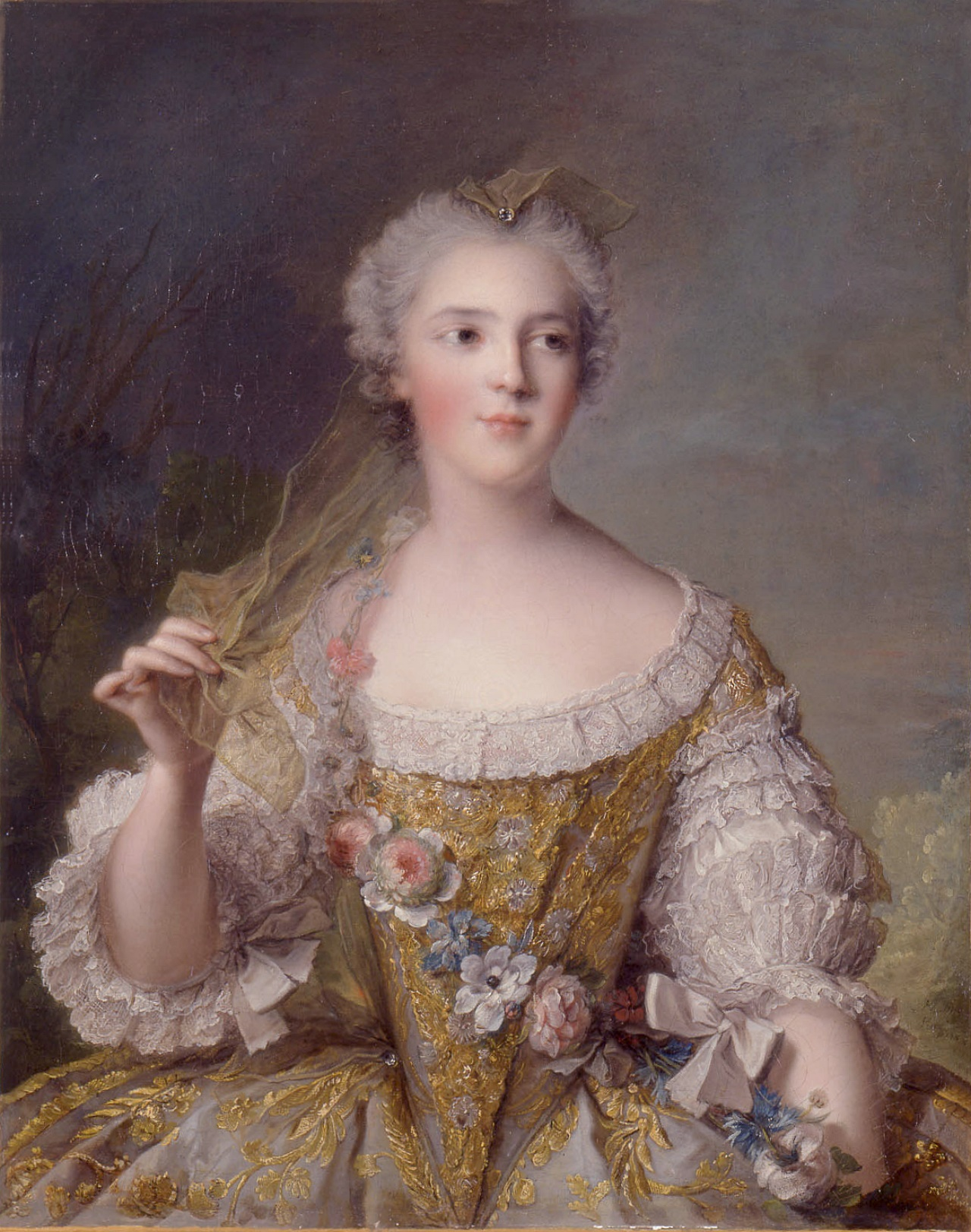
- Portrait of Sophie, by Jean-Marc Nattier (1748)
- Born: 27 July 1734; Palace of Versailles, Versailles, Kingdom of France
- Died: 2 March 1782 (aged 47); Palace of Versailles, Versailles, Kingdom of France
- Burial: Basilica of St Denis, Saint-Denis, Seine-Saint-Denis, France
Names
- Sophie Philippine Élisabeth Justine de France
- House: Bourbon
- Father: Louis XV
- Mother: Marie Leszczyńska

Sophie of France (Sophie Philippine Élisabeth Justine; 27 July 1734 – 2 March 1782) was a French princess, a fille de France. She was the sixth daughter and eighth child of King Louis XV and his queen consort, Marie Leszczyńska. First known as Madame Cinquième (an older sister, Marie Louise, had died in 1733), she later became Madame Sophie. She and her sisters were collectively known as Mesdames. In 1777, Sophie and her elder sister Adélaïde were both given the title Duchess of Louvois.

== Biography ==
=== Early life ===
Sophie Philippine Élisabeth Justine was born on 27 July 1734 in France. She was the eighth child and sixth daughter of King Louis XV and his charitable wife, Marie Leszczyńska, who was nicknamed "The Good Queen" by the common people. Sophie is less well known than many of her sisters. Her birth at the Palace of Versailles was relatively unremarked. Her second name, Philippine, was given in honour of her older brother Philippe, who had died the previous year. Sophie and her sisters were collectively called the Mesdames.

Unlike the older children of Louis XV, she was not raised at Versailles but, in June 1738, sent to live at the Abbey of Fontevraud with her elder sister Madame Victoire and younger sisters Madame Thérèse (who died young) and Madame Louise, because the cost of raising the sisters in Versailles with all the status they were entitled to was deemed too expensive by Cardinal Fleury, Louis XV's chief minister. Their mother, Marie Leszczyńska, was forbidden from visiting them and thus frequently wrote to them and sent them gifts such as a toy horse for little Sophie. On 6 June, they officially left Versailles for Fontevraud in eight coaches and two chaises with twenty wagon loads of luggage. The journey took thirteen days.

According to Madame Campan, who was employed as the reader to Sophie and her sisters Victoire and Louise in 1768, the Mesdames had rather a traumatic upbringing in Fontevraud, and were not given much education:

"Cardinal Fleury, who in truth had the merit of reestablishing the finances, carried this system of economy so far as to obtain from the King the suppression of the household of the four younger Princesses. They were brought up as mere boarders in a convent eighty leagues distant from the Court. Saint Cyr would have been more suitable for the reception of the King’s daughters; but probably the Cardinal shared some of those prejudices which will always attach to even the most useful institutions, and which, since the death of Louis XIV, had been raised against the noble establishment of Madame de Maintenon. Madame Louise often assured me that at twelve years of age she was not mistress of the whole alphabet, and never learnt to read fluently until after her return to Versailles. Madame Victoire attributed certain paroxysms of terror, which she was never able to conquer, to the violent alarms she experienced at the Abbey of Fontevraud, whenever she was sent, by way of penance, to pray alone in the vault where the sisters were interred. A gardener belonging to the abbey died raving mad. His habitation, without the walls, was near a chapel of the abbey, where Mesdames were taken to repeat the prayers for those in the agonies of death. Their prayers were more than once interrupted by the shrieks of the dying man."

=== Reign of Louis XV ===
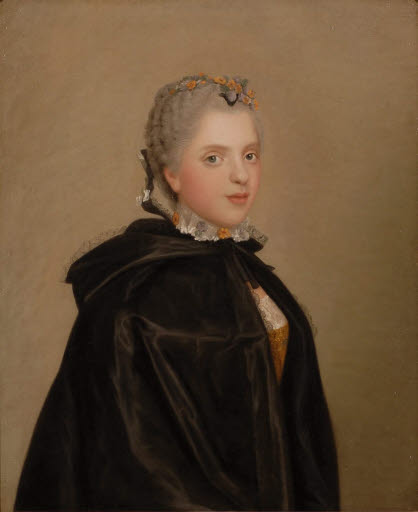
Princesse Sophie Philippine Élisabeth Justine de France (portrait by Jean-Étienne Liotard, c. 1750). Collection Rau for UNICEF

Madame Sophie and her sister Louise were allowed to return to the court of Versailles in 1750, two years after Victoire. Madame de Pompadour, who witnessed the arrival of Sophie and her younger sister Louise from Fontevrault, described Sophie as "almost as tall as I" and "very attractive if rather plump, with a fine complexion …".

According to Madame Campan's memoirs, while their education had been neglected in the convent, they compensated for this and studied extensively, after their return to court, encouraged by their brother, Louis, with whom they immediately formed a close attachment. The Mesdames learned to write French correctly, while also learning Italian and English. They also learned higher branches of mathematics, turning and dialling, and history.

The King referred to them by nicknames: he called Madame Adélaïde, 'Loque' (Tatters/Rag/Rags/Scraggy); Madame Victoire, 'Coche' (Pig/Piggy/Sow); Madame Louise, 'Chiffe' (Shoddy silk/Rags); and Madame Sophie, 'Graille' (Grub/Scrap/Carrion crow).

Madame Sophie never married, but became a member of the collective group of unmarried princesses known as Mesdames. Charles Philippe d'Albert, 4th Duke of Luynes noted that Sophie and her siblings would assist their mother Marie Leszczyńska on various charitable activities she initiated outside Versailles such as giving money and clothes to the poor on various parishes. Being described as of a shy and reserved nature, she did not attract much attention. She did not exercise any influence at the court, but let herself be directed by her older sister Madame Adélaïde, following her in her antipathy against her father's mistresses, Madame de Pompadour and then Madame du Barry. Madame Sophie enjoyed the Château de Bellevue in Meudon and the Château de Louvois in Marne.

In 1761, when her sister, Victoire, in the company of Adélaïde, visited the waters in Lorraine for medical purposes, Sophie and Louise visited Paris for the first time.

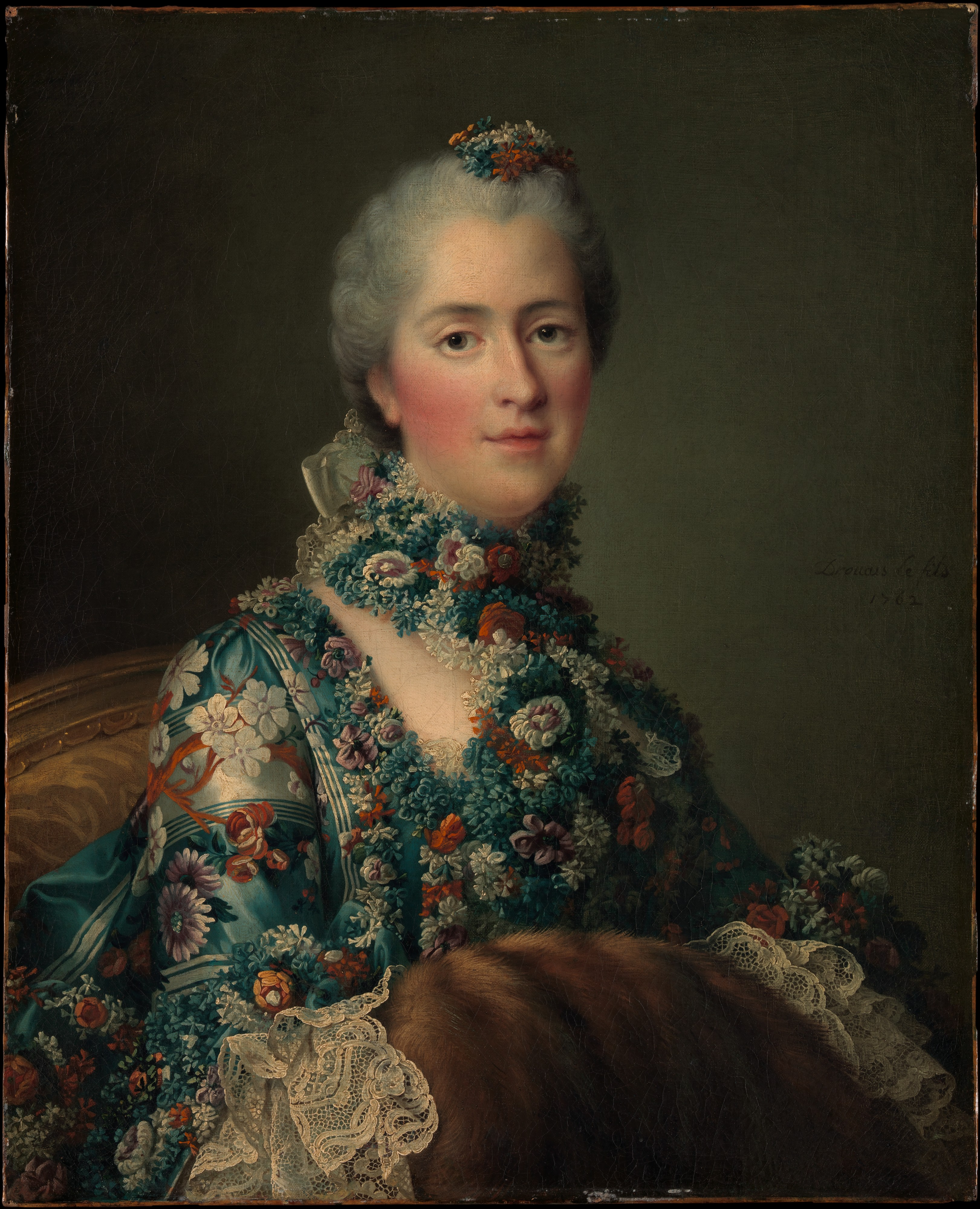
Madame Sophie de France (portrait by François-Hubert Drouais, c. 1762). The Metropolitan Museum of Art

Madame Campan, who was employed as her reader in 1768, described her thusly:

"Madame Sophie was remarkably ugly; never did I behold a person with so unprepossessing an appearance; she walked with the greatest rapidity; and, in order to recognise the people who placed themselves along her path without looking at them, she acquired the habit of leering on one side, like a hare. This Princess was so exceedingly diffident that a person might be with her daily for years together without hearing her utter a single word. It was asserted, however, that she displayed talent, and even amiability, in the society of some favourite ladies. She taught herself a great deal, but she studied alone; the presence of a reader would have disconcerted her very much. There were, however, occasions on which the Princess, generally so intractable, became all at once affable and condescending, and manifested the most communicative good-nature; this would happen during a storm; so great was her alarm on such an occasion that she then approached the most humble, and would ask them a thousand obliging questions; a flash of lightning made her squeeze their hands; a peal of thunder would drive her to embrace them, but with the return of the calm, the Princess resumed her stiffness, her reserve, and her repellent air, and passed all by without taking the slightest notice of any one, until a fresh storm restored to her at once her dread and her affability."

And the life of the sisters in the last years of the reign of their father was described as follows:

"Louis XV. saw very little of his family. He came every morning by a private staircase into the apartment of Madame Adélaïde. He often brought and drank their coffee that he had made himself. Madame Adélaïde pulled a bell which apprised Madame Victoire of the King’s visit; Madame Victoire, on rising to go to her sister’s apartment, rang for Madame Sophie, who in her turn rang for Madame Louise. The apartments of Mesdames were of very large dimensions. Madame Louise occupied the farthest room. This latter lady was deformed and very short; the poor Princess used to run with all her might to join the daily meeting, but, having a number of rooms to cross, she frequently in spite of her haste, had only just time to embrace her father before he set out for the chase. Every evening, at six, Mesdames interrupted my reading to them to accompany the princes to Louis XV.; this visit was called the King’s 'debotter',—[Debotter, meaning the time of unbooting.]—and was marked by a kind of etiquette. Mesdames put on an enormous hoop, which set out a petticoat ornamented with gold or embroidery; they fastened a long train round their waists, and concealed the undress of the rest of their clothing by a long cloak of black taffety which enveloped them up to the chin. The chevaliers d’honneur, the ladies in waiting, the pages, the equerries, and the ushers bearing large flambeaux, accompanied them to the King. In a moment the whole palace, generally so still, was in motion; the King kissed each Princess on the forehead, and the visit was so short that the reading which it interrupted was frequently resumed at the end of a quarter of an hour; Mesdames returned to their apartments, and untied the strings of their petticoats and trains; they resumed their tapestry, and I my book."

In 1770, the fourteen-year-old Marie Antoinette became Dauphine by marriage to the nephew of Madame Sophie and her sisters, the Dauphin, the future Louis XVI. Because of the close relationship between the Dauphin and his aunts, Marie Antoinette also initially came close to the Mesdames her first years in France as the senior royal women at court. The Mesdames use to alternate with the Countess of Provence in accompanying Marie Antoinette on official assignments. The close relationship between Marie Antoinette and Mesdames was, however, discontinued in 1772, after the attempt to entice Marie Antoinette to humiliate Madame du Barry was thwarted, a plan which had been led by Madame Adélaïde with support of Madame Victoire and Madame Sophie.

=== Reign of Louis XVI ===
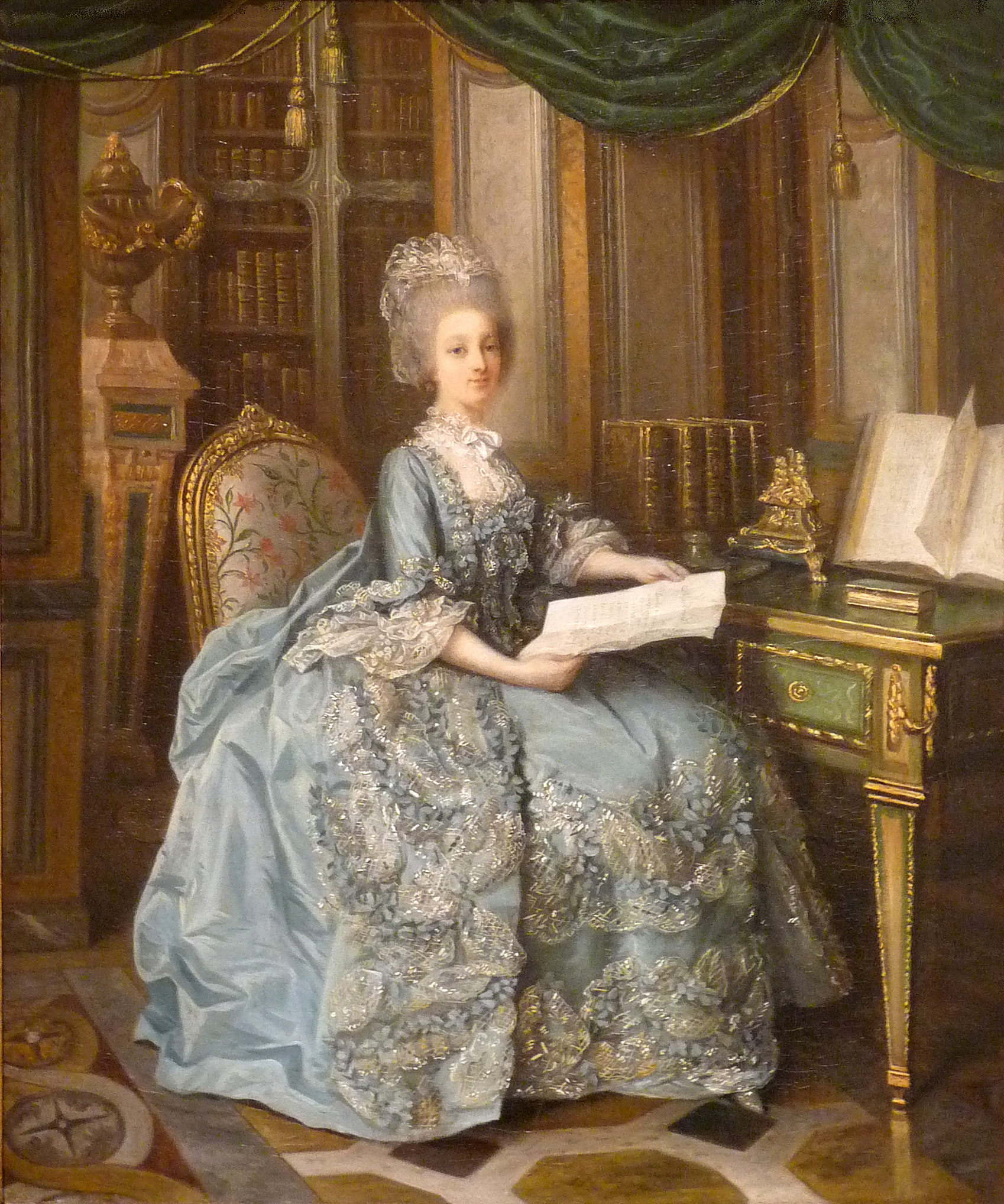
Sophie, previously thought to be a portrait of Marie Antoinette (by Lié Louis Périn-Salbreux, 1770s)

From April 1774, Madame Sophie, along with her sisters Adélaïde, Victoire and Louise, attended their father, Louis XV, on his deathbed until his death from smallpox on 10 May. Despite the fact that the sisters had never had smallpox, the Mesdames were allowed to attend him, even while other male members of the royal family, as well as the Dauphine, Marie Antoinette, were kept away due to the serious risk of catching the illness. Since the Mesdames were female, and therefore of no political importance because of the Salic law, they were not prevented from doing so.

After the death of Louis XV, he was succeeded by his grandson, Louis-Auguste, as Louis XVI. Louis XVI referred to his aunts as Mesdames Tantes. The sisters did catch smallpox from their father's deathbed, and were kept in quarantine in a little house near the Château de Choisy, to which the court evacuated after the death of the King, until they eventually recovered.

Their nephew, the King, allowed them to keep their apartments in the Palace of Versailles, and they continued attending court at special occasions. Such as for the visit of Joseph II, Holy Roman Emperor, who reportedly charmed Madame Sophie's sister Adélaïde. However, they distanced themselves from court and often preferred to reside in their own Château de Bellevue in Meudon; they also traveled annually to Vichy, always with a retinue of at least three hundred people, and made the waters there fashionable. The Mesdames continued to be the confidants of Louis XVI, and they also maintained a good relationship with their niece, Princess Élisabeth of France, and often visited her in her retreat at the Domain of Montreuil.

In 1777, Sophie and her sister Adélaïde were both given the title of Duchess of Louvois by their nephew, the King, after having jointly acquired an estate of that name.

The Mesdames did not get along well with the new Queen of France, Marie Antoinette. When the Queen introduced the new custom of informal evening family suppers, as well as other informal habits which undermined the formal court etiquette, it resulted in an exodus of the old court nobility in opposition to the Queen's reforms, which gathered in the salon of the Mesdames. They entertained extensively at Bellevue, as well as at Versailles; their salon was reportedly regularly frequented by minister Jean Frédéric Phélypeaux, Count of Maurepas, whom Adélaïde had elevated to power through Louis Joseph, Prince of Condé, and Louis François Joseph, Prince of Conti—both members of the anti-Austrian party. Pierre Beaumarchais was also a frequent guest, who read aloud his satires of Austria and its power figures. The Austrian Ambassador, Florimond Claude, Comte de Mercy-Argenteau, reported that their salon was a center of intrigues against Marie Antoinette, where the Mesdames tolerated poems satirizing the queen.

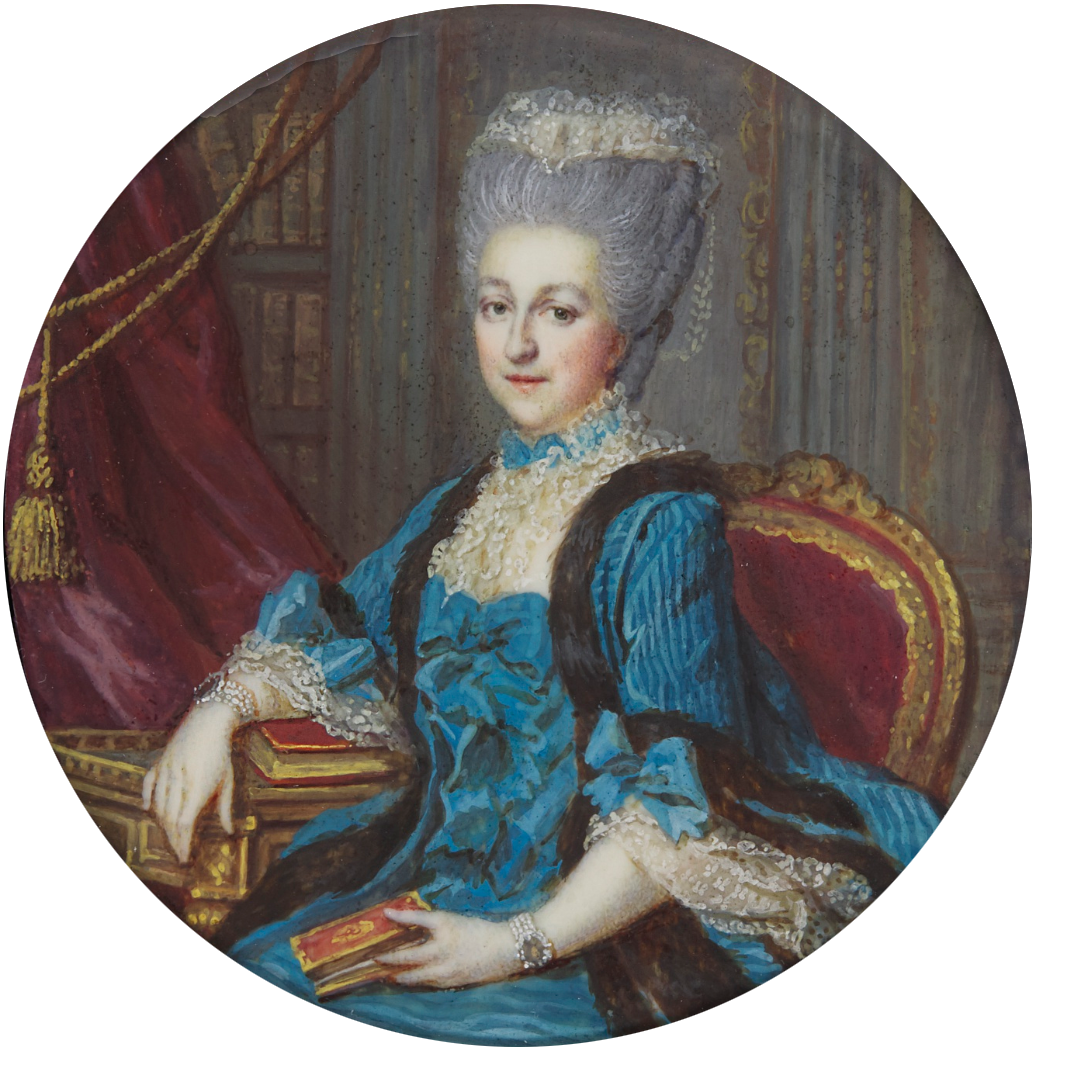
Portrait by François Dumont, c. 1775

The Mesdames gathered the extreme conservative Dévots party of nobility opposed to the philosophes, encyclopedists and economists.

=== Death, burial and aftermath ===
On 2 March 1782, at the Palace of Versailles in France, Sophie died due to dropsy at the age of forty-seven. She outlived 6 of her 9 siblings. She was buried in the royal tomb at the Basilica of St Denis, which was plundered and destroyed at the time of the French Revolution.

Her great-niece, Sophie Beatrix, youngest daughter of Louis XVI and Marie Antoinette, was named after her.

== In popular culture ==
In 2006, she was played by Scottish actress Shirley Henderson in the movie Marie Antoinette.

== Ancestry ==
Ancestors of Sophie of France

8. Louis, Dauphin of France
4. Louis, Duke of Burgundy
9. Maria Anna Victoria of Bavaria
2. Louis XV of France
10. Victor Amadeus II of Sardinia
5. Marie Adélaïde of Savoy
11. Anne Marie of Orléans
1. Sophie of France
12. Rafał Leszczyński
6. Stanisław I Leszczyński
13. Anna Jabłonowska
3. Marie Leszczyńska
14. Jan Karol Opaliński
7. Katarzyna Opalińska
15. Zofia Czarnkowska

== See also ==
- Mesdames de France
