= Victoire of France =

French princess (1733–1799)

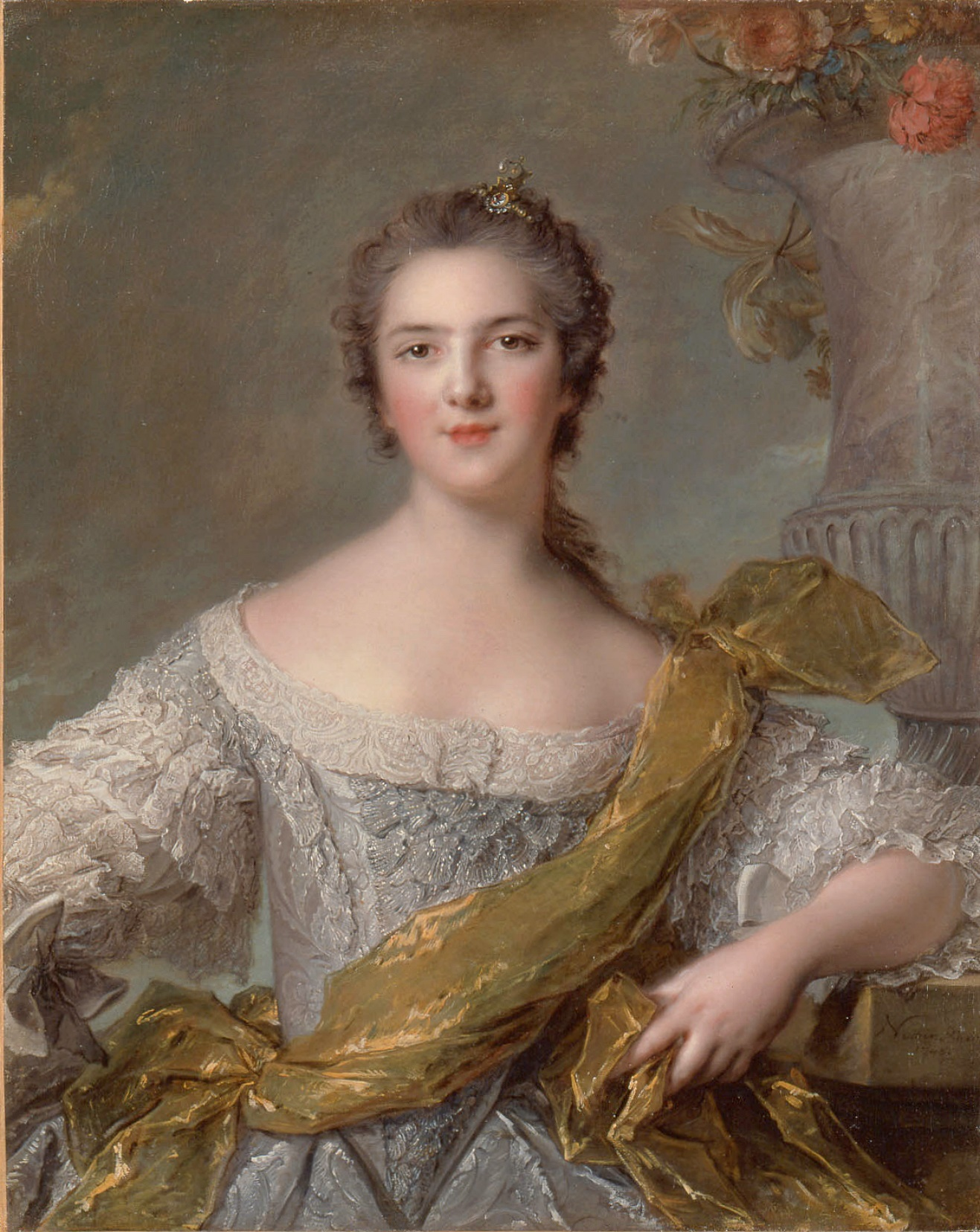
- Portrait by Jean-Marc Nattier, 1748
- Born: 11 May 1733; Palace of Versailles, Versailles, Kingdom of France
- Died: 7 June 1799 (aged 66); Imperial Free City of Trieste, Holy Roman Empire
- Burial: 20 January 1817; Basilica of Saint-Denis
Names
- Marie Louise Thérèse Victoire de France
- House: Bourbon
- Father: Louis XV
- Mother: Marie Leszczyńska

Victoire of France (Marie Louise Thérèse Victoire; 11 May 1733 - 7 June 1799) was a French princess, the daughter of King Louis XV and Queen Marie Leszczyńska. She was named after her parents and Queen Maria Theresa, her great-great-grandmother and the consort of Louis XIV.

Originally known as Madame Quatrième, signifying that she was the fourth daughter of the King, she was later known as Madame Victoire. She outlived eight of her nine siblings, and her older sister Adélaïde of France died less than a year after her. The sisters were collectively known as the Mesdames.

== Life ==
=== Early years ===
Princess Victoire was born at the Palace of Versailles on 11 May 1733. She was the seventh child and fifth daughter of King Louis XV and Queen Maria Leszczyńska. Unlike the older children of Louis XV, Madame Victoire was not raised at the Palace of Versailles. Rather, she was sent to live at the Abbey of Fontevraud with her younger sisters in June 1738. Cardinal Fleury, Louis XV's chief minister, had deemed that the cost of raising them at Versailles with all the status entitled to them would be too expensive. She remained there until 1748, when she was aged 15.

According to Madame Campan, the Mesdames had rather a traumatic upbringing at Fontrevraud and were not given an education befitting their status, and would have preferred them to be schooled at Saint-Cyr, which was much closer to the palace. Madame Louise claimed that she had not been able to read the entire alphabet at twelve years old, and could not read fluently until returning to Versailles. Victoire was traumatized by the punishments she underwent, and thereafter experienced "paroxysms of terror" that she was unable to overcome.

=== Reign of Louis XV ===
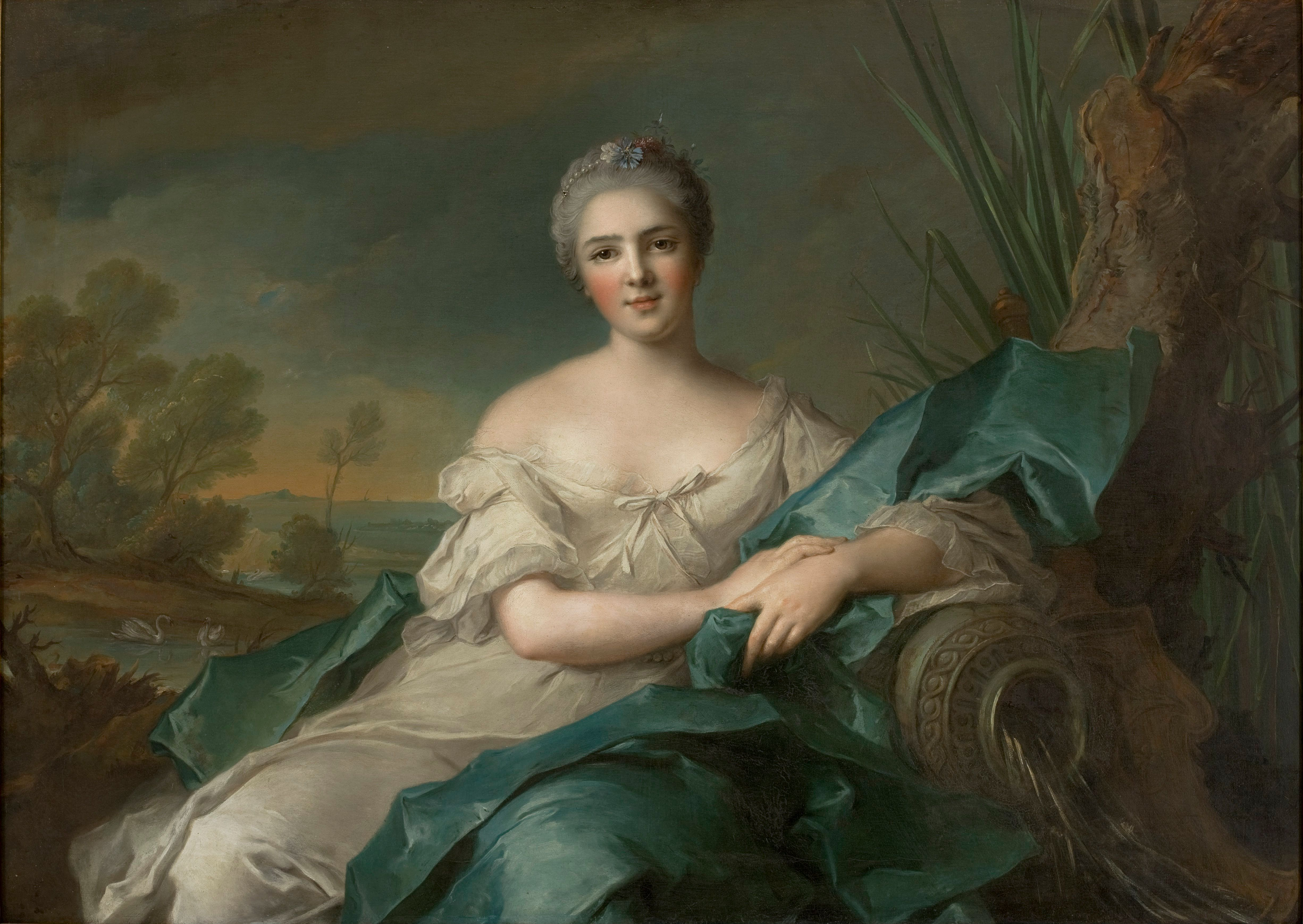
Madame Victoire as Water by Jean-Marc Nattier in 1751, now in the São Paulo Museum of Art in Brazil.

On 24 March 1748, being fifteen and no longer regarded a child, Victoire wrote to her father and successfully asked permission to return to court. Louis XV appointed three maids-of-honour to attend her, and sent Marie-Angélique-Victoire de Bournonville, Duchesse de Duras, to collect her and meet her with her brother the Dauphin at Sceaux. In November 1750, she was joined by her sisters Sophie and Louise.

Upon their arrival at court, they were not included in the household of their elder sisters Henriette and Adélaïde, the Household of the Mesdames aînées ('Elder Mesdames'). Instead they were given their own Household of the Mesdames cadettes, ('Younger Mesdames') headed by the Duchesse de Duras.

While their education had been neglected in the convent, they reportedly compensated for this and studied extensively after their return to court. They learned how to write French properly, learned English and Italian, and educated themselves in history and math. Their endeavors were encouraged by their brother Louis, with whom they immediately formed a close attachment.

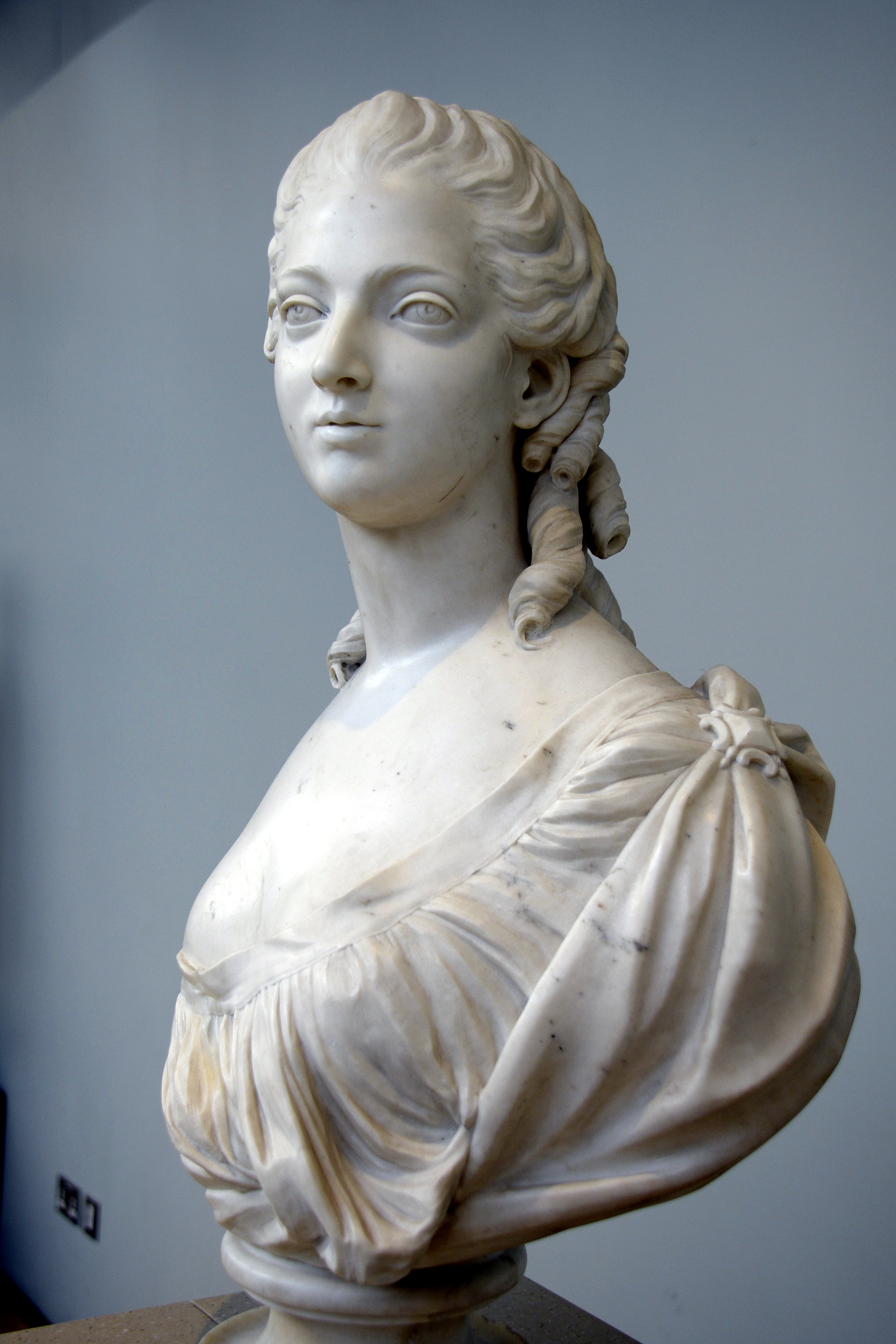
Marble bust of Madame Victoire, by Louis-Claude Vassé, 1763, now housed at the National Museum of Scotland, in Edinburgh

Victoire was successful at court and was regarded as a beauty, being described as "...handsome and very graceful; her address, mien, and smile were in perfect accordance with the goodness of her heart," with "soft brown eyes," a "fresh complexion" and a "desire to please." In contrast to her elder sister Adélaïde, Victoire was described as "good, sweet-tempered, and affable," and was well-liked both by society and her staff. In 1753, it was suggested that she might eventually marry her brother-in-law, Ferdinand VI of Spain, as his wife, Barbara of Portugal, was seriously ill at the time and expected to die. However, the Queen survived her illness and lived another five years. No other marriage partner of suitable religion and status was found, and Victoire remained unmarried.

Victoire followed her sister Madame Adélaïde in her campaign against the increasing influence of her father's mistress Madame de Pompadour, and later Madame du Barry. She also had a close friendship with her favourite lady-in-waiting the Marquise de Durfort, who "afforded to Madame Victoire agreeable society. The Princess spent almost all her evenings with that lady, and ended by fancying herself domiciled with her."

In 1770, the fourteen-year-old Marie Antoinette became Dauphine by marriage to Madame Victoire's nephew the Dauphin, the future Louis XVI. Because of the close relationship between the Dauphin and his aunts, Marie Antoinette also initially became close to the Mesdames during her first years in France. The Mesdames used to take turns with the Countess of Provence in accompanying Marie Antoinette on official assignments. However, the close relationship between Marie Antoinette and Mesdames was discontinued in 1772, after an attempt to entice Marie Antoinette to humiliate Madame du Barry was thwarted— a plan which had been led by Madame Adélaïde with support of Madame Victoire and Madame Sophie.

=== Reign of Louis XVI ===
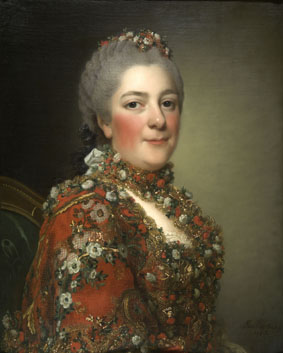
Madame Victoire, Princess of France, depicted by Alexander Roslin c. 1765

From April 1774, Madame Victoire and her sisters attended to their father Louis XV on his deathbed until his death from smallpox on 10 May. Despite the fact the sisters had never had smallpox, and the male members of the royal family, as well as the dauphine, were kept away because of the high risk of catching the illness, the Mesdames were allowed to attend to him until his death, being female and therefore of no political importance because of the Salic law. After the death of Louis XV, he was succeeded by his grandson Louis-Auguste as Louis XVI, who referred to his aunts as Mesdames Tantes. The sisters were infected by their father and fell ill with smallpox and were kept in quarantine at a little house near the Château de Choisy until they recovered.

Their nephew the King allowed them to keep their apartments in the Palace of Versailles, and they kept attending court for special occasions, such as the visit of Joseph II, Holy Roman Emperor. However, they distanced themselves from court and often preferred to reside in their own Château de Bellevue in Meudon; they also travelled annually to Vichy, always with a retinue of at least three hundred people, and made vacationing there fashionable. The Mesdames continued to be the confidants of Louis XVI, and they also maintained a good relationship with their niece, Princess Élisabeth, and often visited her in her retreat at the Domain of Montreuil.

During this period, the Mesdames did not get along well with Marie Antoinette. When the Queen introduced the new custom of informal evening family suppers, as well as other informal habits which undermined formal court etiquette, it resulted in an exodus of the old court nobility in opposition to the Queen's reforms, whom then gathered in the Mesdames' salon. They entertained extensively at Bellevue as well as at Versailles; their salon was reportedly regularly frequented by minister Jean Frédéric Phélypeaux, Count of Maurepas, whom Adélaïde had elevated to power; by Louis Joseph, Prince of Condé a member of the anti-Austrian party; and Pierre Beaumarchais, a playwright. The Austrian Ambassador Florimond Claude, Comte de Mercy-Argenteau reported that their salon was a centre of intrigues against Marie Antoinette, where the Mesdames tolerated poems satirizing the queen. The Mesdames gathered the extreme conservative Dévots party of the nobility that opposed the philosophes, the Encyclopédistes, and the economists.

== Revolution and later life ==
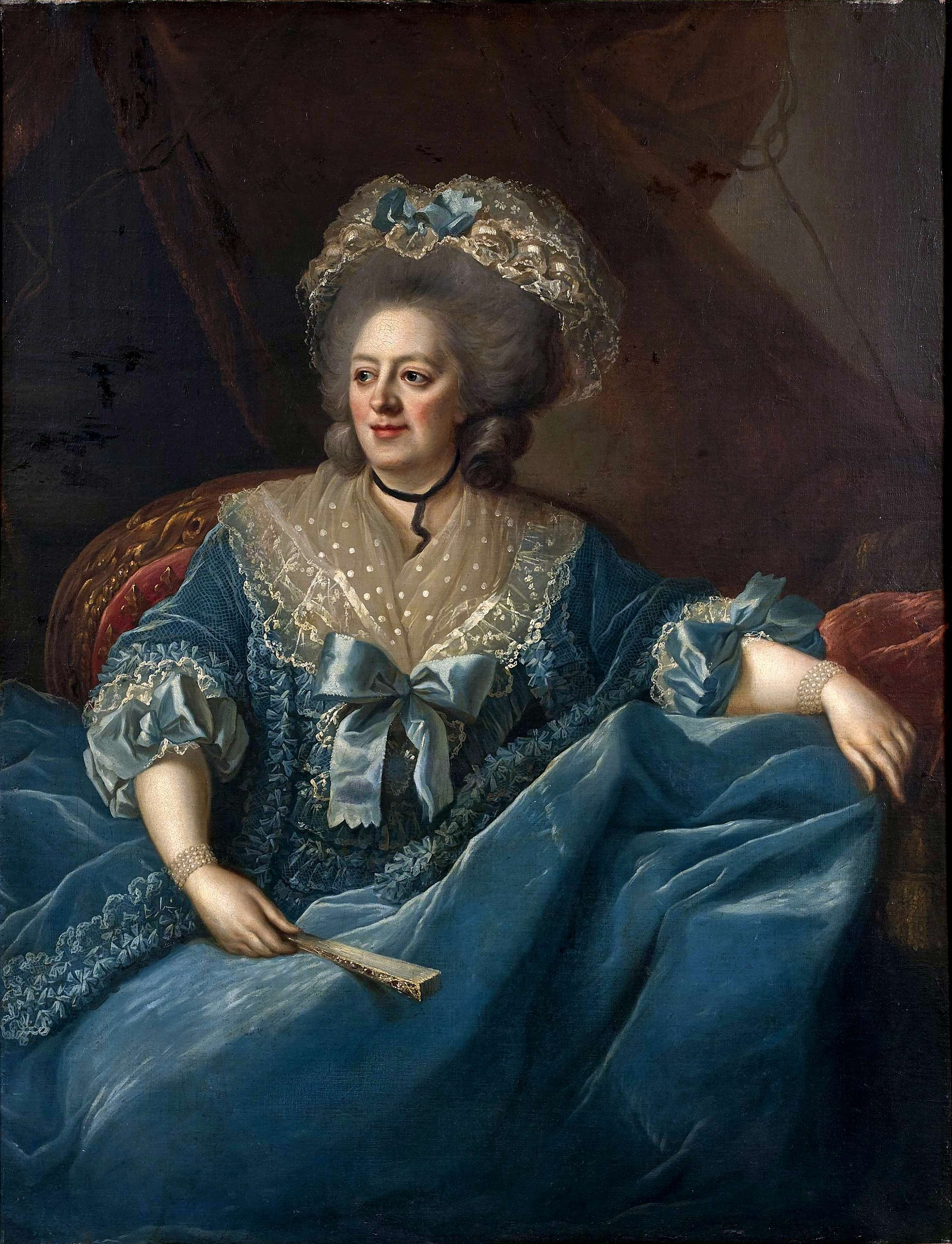
Victoire in 1786, by Johann Julius Heinsius

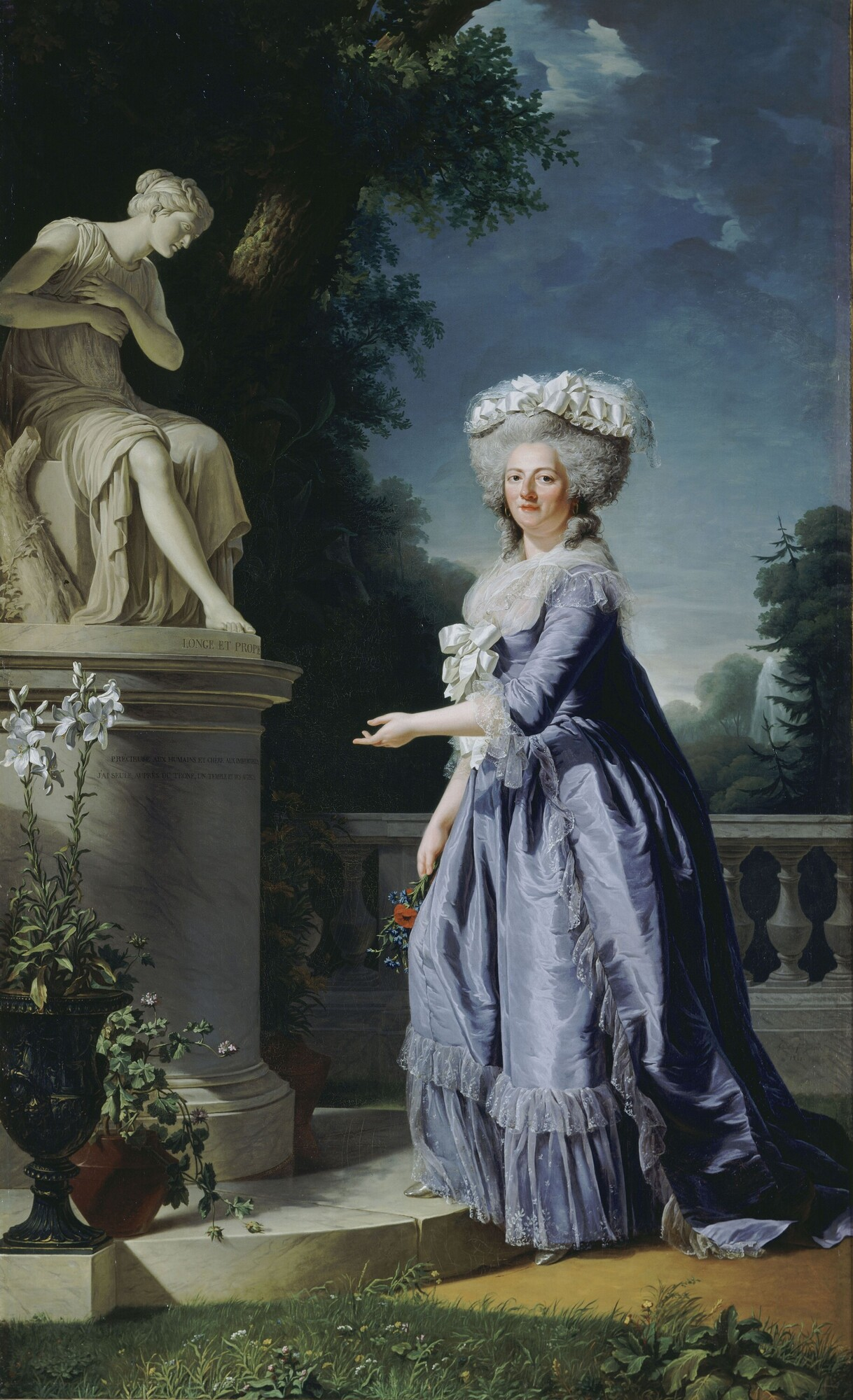
Victoire, painted by Adélaïde Labille-Guiard in 1788

Madame Victoire and her sister Adélaïde were present at Versailles during the Women's March on Versailles on 6 October 1789, and were among those gathered in the King's apartment on the night of the attack on Marie Antoinette's bedroom. They participated in the wagon train leaving the Palace of Versailles for Paris; on the way, however, their carriage separated from the rest of the procession before they reached Paris. They never took up residence at the Tuileries Palace with the royal family, but preferred to retire to the Château de Bellevue in Meudon instead.

Revolutionary laws against the Catholic Church caused them to apply for passports from their nephew, the King, to travel on pilgrimage to the Basilica of Saint Peter in Rome. Louis XVI signed their passports and notified the Cardinal de Bernis, the French Ambassador to Rome, of their impending arrival. On 3 February 1791, when they were about to leave, anonymous notification of their intentions was sent to the Jacobin Club, which caused a deputation of protest to the National Assembly. On 19 February, a crowd of women assembled at the Palais Royal and agreed to march out to the Château de Bellevue in an attempt to stop the Mesdames from departing. The Mesdames were warned and left the château in the carriage of a visitor. They did not have the time to bring their baggage wagons; these were protected, however, and sent after them by General Louis-Alexandre Berthier. They left for Italy in a procession of wagons on 20 February 1791 with a large entourage.

Their departure was given attention in the press. The Chronique de Paris wrote: "Two Princesses, sedentary by condition, age, and taste, are suddenly possessed by a mania for travelling and running about the world. That is singular, but possible. They are going, so people say, to kiss the Pope's slipper. That is droll, but edifying. [...] The Ladies, and especially Madame Adélaïde, want to exercise the rights of man. That is natural. [...] The fair travellers are followed by a train of eighty persons. That is fine. But they carry away twelve million. That is very ugly. [...]", while the Sahhats Jacobites wrote: "The Ladies are going to Italy to try the power of their tears and their charms upon the princes of that country. Already the Grand Master of Malta has caused Madame Adélaïde to be informed that he will give her his heart and hand as soon as she has quitted France, and that she may count upon the assistance of three galleys and forty-eight cavaliers, young and old. Our Holy Father undertakes to marry Victoire and promises her his army of three hundred men to bring about a counter-revolution."

They were temporarily stopped by a riot against their departure in Moret, and on 21 February, they were detained for several days at a tavern in Arnay-le-Duc, where the municipality wished to confirm their permission to leave from the National Assembly before allowing them to continue. In Paris, the affair caused riots: protesters invaded the Tuileries Garden and demanded that the King order his aunts to return to France. The matter was debated in the National Assembly, where Louis, comte de Narbonne-Lara acted as their spokesperson. Honoré Gabriel Riqueti, comte de Mirabeau convinced the National Assembly that "The welfare of the people cannot depend on the journey the Ladies undertake to Rome; while they are promenading near the places where the Capitol once stood, nothing prevents the edifice of our liberty from rising to its utmost height. [...] Europe will doubtless be much astonished when it learns that the National Assembly of France spent four entire hours in deliberating on the departure of two ladies who would rather hear Mass in Rome - than in Paris." The public at Arnay-le-Duc, however, was not pleased with the decision of the Assembly and so, because of a riot to prevent their departure, the sisters were not able to leave until 3 March.

On several occasions between Lyon and the border, they were exposed to public demonstrations. But they finally left France, crossing the border at Le Pont-de-Beauvoisin, Isère, where they were hooted derisively from the French shore while salvos of artillery from the Italian shore welcomed them to Savoy. They were met by a royal guard of escort and by the chief palace officials of King Victor Amadeus III of Sardinia, who installed them in the Château de Chambéry. They continued to visit their niece Clotilde at the royal court of Turin, but stayed only a fortnight: "not even the touching and gracious welcome offered to them by the royal family, the affection shown to them by the Count of Artois and the Prince and Princess of Piedmont, their nephew and niece, could make them forget the anguish and perils they had left behind them, and which encircled their family and country with gloom. Mme Victoire wept continuously, Mme Adélaïde did not cry, but she had almost lost the use of speech."

They arrived in Rome on 16 April 1791, where they stayed for about five years. In Rome, the sisters were given the protection of Pope Pius VI and housed in the palace of Cardinal de Bernis. In the Friday receptions of Cardinal de Bernis, Cornelia Knight described them: "Madame Victoire had also an agreeable face, much good sense, and great sweetness of temper. Their dress, and that of their suite, were old-fashioned, but unostentatious. The jewels they brought with them had been sold, one by one, to afford assistance to the poor emigrées who applied to the princesses in their distress. They were highly respected by the Romans; not only by the higher orders, but by the common people, who had a horror of the French revolution, and no great partiality for that nation in general." When news came that Louis XVI and his family had left Paris on the Flight to Varennes in June, a misunderstanding first caused the impression that the escape had succeeded; at this news, "the whole of Rome shouted with joy; the crowd massed itself under the windows of the Princesses crying out: Long live the King!", and the Mesdames arranged a grand banquet for the nobility of Rome in celebration, which had to be interrupted when it was clarified that the escape had in fact failed.

Upon the invasion of Italy by Revolutionary France in 1796, Adélaïde and Victoire left Rome for Naples, where Marie Antoinette's sister, Maria Carolina, was queen, and settled at the Neapolitan royal court in the Palace of Caserta. Queen Maria Carolina found their presence in Naples difficult: "I have the awful torment of harbouring the two old Princesses of France with eighty persons in their retinue and every conceivable impertinence... The same ceremonies are observed in the interior of their apartments here as were formerly at Versailles."

When Naples was invaded by France in 1799, they left for Corfu and finally settled in Trieste, where Victoire died of breast cancer. Adélaïde died one year later. Their bodies were returned to France by Louis XVIII at the time of the Bourbon Restoration and buried at the Basilica of Saint-Denis.

== In popular culture ==
In Sofia Coppola's film Marie Antoinette (2006), Victoire is played by American comedian Molly Shannon.

== Ancestry ==
Ancestors of Victoire of France

16. Louis XIV of France
8. Louis, Grand Dauphin
17. Maria Theresa of Austria
4. Louis, Duke of Burgundy
18. Ferdinand Maria, Elector of Bavaria
9. Maria Anna Victoria of Bavaria
19. Henriette Adelaide of Savoy
2. Louis XV of France
20. Charles Emmanuel II, Duke of Savoy
10. Victor Amadeus II of Sardinia
21. Marie Jeanne Baptiste of Savoy
5. Marie Adélaïde of Savoy
22. Philippe I, Duke of Orléans
11. Anne Marie of Orléans
23. Henrietta of England
1. Victoire of France
24. Bogusław Leszczyński
12. Rafał Leszczyński
25. Joanna Katarzyna Radziwiłł
6. Stanisław Leszczyński
26. Stanisław Jan Jabłonowski
13. Anna Jabłonowska
27. Marianna Kazanowska
3. Marie Leszczyńska
28. Krzysztof Opaliński
14. Jan Karol Opaliński
29. Teresa Czarnkowska
7. Katarzyna Opalińska
30. Adam Uryel Czarnkowski
15. Zofia Czarnkowska
31. Teresa Zaleska

== See also ==
- Mesdames de France
