= Philippe de France =

Philippe de France may refer to:

- Philippe I, Duke of Orléans, Philippe de France, (1640–1701), Duke of Anjou then Duke of Orléans; son of Louis XIII of France and Anne of Austria; known as Monsieur
- Philip V of Spain, Philippe de France, Duke of Anjou and later King of Spain; son of Louis, le Grand Dauphin and Duchess Maria Anna of Bavaria
- Philippe, Duke of Anjou, Philippe de France, (1730–1733), Duke of Anjou; son of Louis XV of France and Marie Leszczyńska
