= Philippe, Duke of Anjou =

French prince (1730–1733)

Philippe Louis
- Duke of Anjou
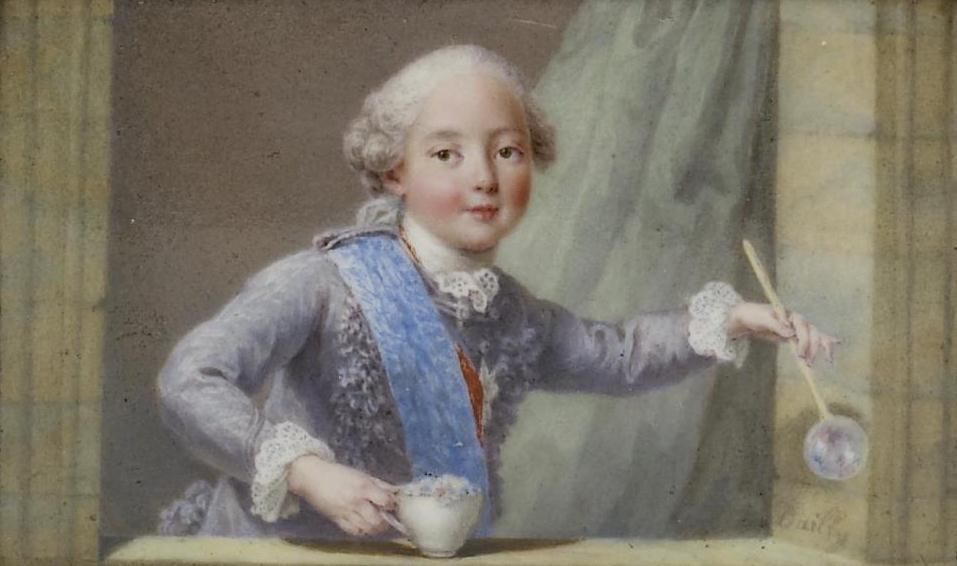
- "Philippe blowing bubbles": a depiction of Philippe on a snuffbox in the Walters Museum
- Born: 30 August 1730; Palace of Versailles, Versailles, Kingdom of France
- Died: 7 April 1733 (aged 2); Palace of Versailles, Versailles, Kingdom of France
- Burial: Basilica of St Denis
Names
- Philippe Louis de France
- House: Bourbon
- Father: Louis XV of France
- Mother: Marie Leszczyńska

Philippe Louis of France, Duke of Anjou (Philippe Louis; 30 August 1730 – 7 April 1733) was a French prince and the second son of King Louis XV of France and his popular Queen Marie Leszczyńska. He was styled duke of Anjou from birth.

== Biography ==
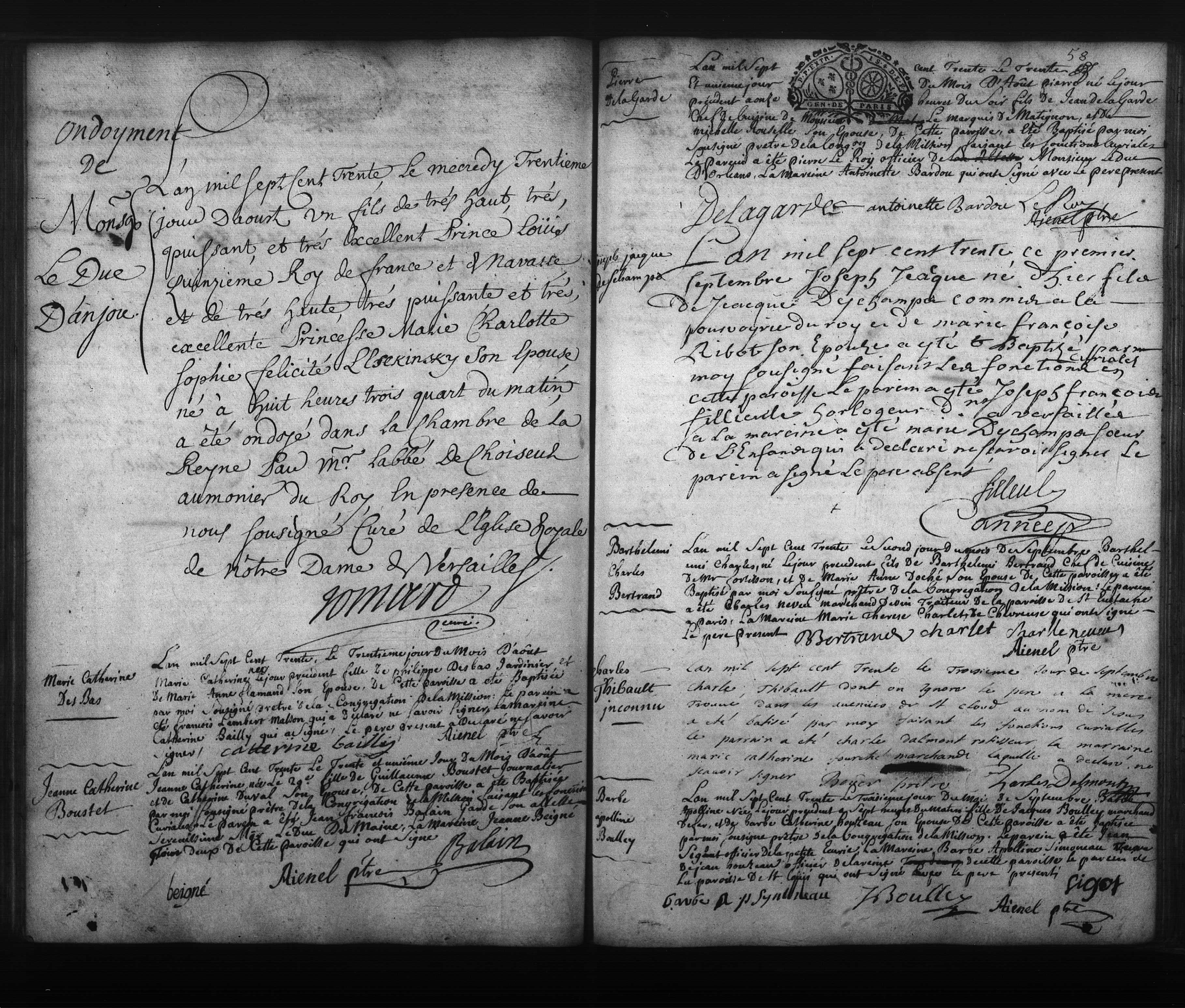
Baptism registers at Notre-Dame de Versailles, mentioning the anointing of the Duke of Anjou.

Philippe was born at the Palace of Versailles on 30 August 1730, the second son and fifth child of King Louis XV and Queen Marie Leszczyńska. As a son of the King, he held the rank of a fils de France ("son of France"), which also entitled him to the style of Royal Highness. In his short lifetime, he was the third most important male at court, after his father Louis XV and his elder brother Louis, Dauphin of France.

Philippe was styled Duke of Anjou from birth; this title had last been bestowed on his father, from his own birth in 1710 until his accession to the throne in 1715.

Philippe grew up at Versailles with his brother, the Dauphin, and their twin sisters Louise Élisabeth (Madame Royale, later Duchess of Parma) and Henriette (Madame Seconde). In his short lifetime, Philippe saw the birth of his younger sister Madame Adélaïde, in March 1732, and the death of his older sister Marie Louise de France (Madame Troisième) from the common cold, in February 1733.

Always a sickly child, Philippe was cared for by a group of female attendants, as royal children were cared for by women until the age of five. As part of their intensely superstitious beliefs, the women mixed in earth from the grave of Saint Medardus with his food; the child was given so much earth that his organs failed. As a result, Philippe died at Versailles on 7 April 1733, at the age of two which devastated his pregnant mother, Queen Marie Leszczyńska. He was buried at the Royal Basilica of Saint-Denis outside Paris.

== Ancestry ==
Ancestors of Philippe of France

8. Louis, Dauphin of France
4. Louis, Duke of Burgundy
9. Maria Anna Victoria of Bavaria
2. Louis XV of France
10. Victor Amadeus II of Sardinia
5. Marie Adélaïde of Savoy
11. Anne Marie d'Orléans
1. Philippe, Duke of Anjou
12. Rafał Leszczyński
6. Stanisław I Leszczyński
13. Anna Jabłonowska
3. Marie Leszczyńska
14. Jan Karol Opaliński
7. Katarzyna Opalińska
15. Zofia Czarnkowska

== Notes ==
Philippe, Duke of Anjou House of Bourbon Cadet branch of the Capetian dynasty Born: 30 August 1730 Died: 7 April 1733
French royalty
Preceded by Vacant; Louis	Duke of Anjou; 30 August 1730 – 7 April 1733	Succeeded by Vacant; Louis Stanislas Xavier
