= Marie Louise of France =

French princess (1728–1733)

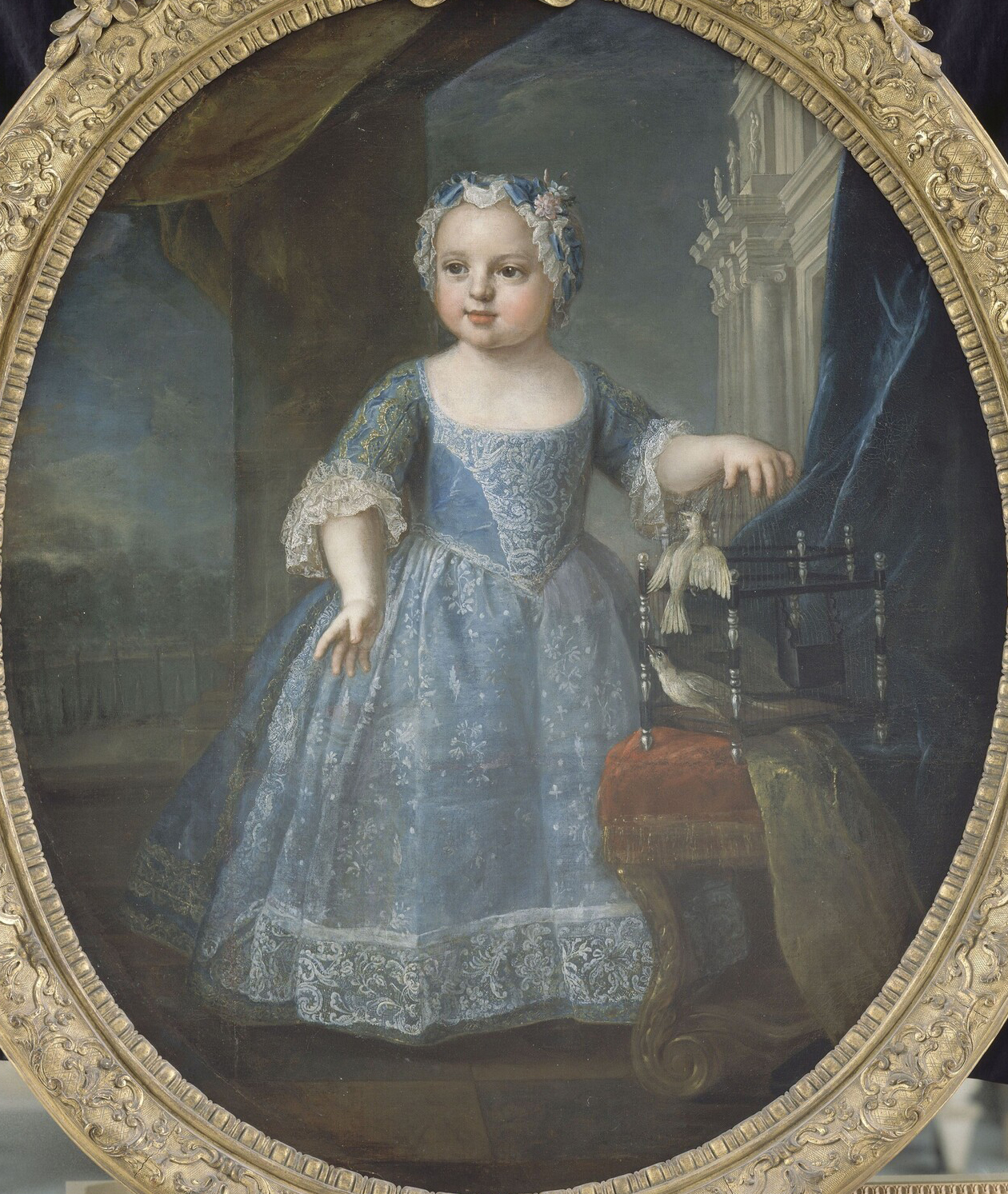
- Portrait by Pierre Gobert, 1733
- Born: 28 July 1728; Palace of Versailles, Versallies, Kingdom of France
- Died: 19 February 1733 (aged 4); Palace of Versailles, Versailles, Kingdom of France
- Burial: Basilica of Saint-Denis, Paris, France
- House: Bourbon
- Father: Louis XV
- Mother: Marie Leszczyńska

Marie Louise of France (28 July 1728 – 19 February 1733) was a French princess, a fille de France. She was the daughter of King Louis XV and Queen Marie Leszczyńska.

== Biography ==
Born at the Palace of Versailles, the third child of Louis XV and his queen, Marie Leszczyńska, she was known as Madame Troisième until her baptism a few weeks before her death.

Her birth was not greeted with much enthusiasm due to her gender; her father had been hoping for a son to call his Dauphin and thus have an heir to the throne. When it was clear that a girl was born, the anticipated celebrations for the expected Dauphin were cancelled and Madame Troisième only had a mass sung in the Chapel of Versailles in her honour.

She grew up at Versailles with her older twin sisters Madame Première and Madame Seconde. The following year, 1729, the three children were joined by the Dauphin of France Louis.

The royal family were again joined by another son in 1730, Philippe, Duke of Anjou. In the winter of 1733, Madame Troisième caught a cold; an epidemic occurred at Versailles at the same time. The child was put in the care of the Gascon doctor Monsieur Bouillac; the doctor administered emetics and had the child bled. Madame Troisième was quickly baptised at Versailles and given the names of her parents Marie and the feminine form of Louis, "Louise". She died at Versailles, exhausted. Barrister Barbier noted in his memoirs that both her parents Louis XV and Marie Leszczyńska were "devastated" over her death as she was the first of their children to die. She was buried at the Royal Basilica of Saint-Denis.

Her portrait was painted by Pierre Gobert around 1730. In 1734 a posthumous portrait was painted by Charles-Joseph Natoire who represented her with her sister, the future Madame Adélaïde.

She has been called Louise over time.

== Ancestry ==
Ancestors of Louise of France

8. Louis, Dauphin of France
4. Louis, Duke of Burgundy
9. Maria Anna Victoria of Bavaria
2. Louis XV of France
10. Victor Amadeus II of Sardinia
5. Marie Adélaïde of Savoy
11. Anne Marie of Orléans
1. Louise of France
12. Rafał Leszczyński
6. Stanisław I Leszczyński
13. Anna Jabłonowska
3. Marie Leszczyńska
14. Jan Karol Opaliński
7. Katarzyna Opalińska
15. Zofia Czarnkowska
