= Louis Tocqué =

French painter (1696–1772)

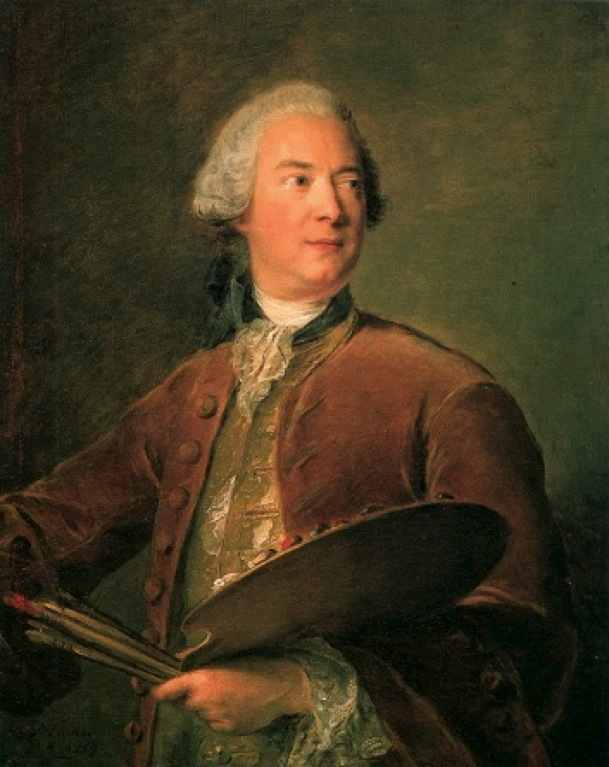
Portrait by Jean-Marc Nattier, 1739

Jean Louis Tocqué (French pronunciation: [ʒɑ̃ lwi tɔke]; 19 November 1696 – 10 February 1772) was a French painter. He specialized in portrait painting.

== Biography ==
Jean Louis Tocqué was born on 19 November 1696 in Paris. His father, who was also a painter, died in April 1710, before Louis was even fourteen. He was eventually brought into the care of another artist, Jean-Marc Nattier. Tocqué studied under Nattier, Nicolas Bertin and Hyacinthe Rigaud in the 1720s. He married Jean-Marc Nattier's daughter Marie Nattier in 1747. He died on 10 February 1772 in Paris.

== Career ==
The first works of Tocqué were painted when he was an apprentice of Jean-Marc Nattier. Louis Tocqué was influenced by Hyacinthe Rigaud, who was also one of his tutors and Nicolas de Largillierre, another French painter. His first major work was the painting of the portrait of Louis XV ordered by his great-grandfather Louis XIV, King of France. In 1740 he painted the portrait of Marie Leszczyńska, Queen of France. From 1737 to 1759 more than fifty of the portraits he painted, were regularly part of the exhibitions of the Salon, the official art exhibition of the Académie des Beaux-Arts in Paris. In 1745 he painted the portrait of Infanta Maria Teresa Rafaela of Spain, one year before her death. In 1757 he went to the Russian Empire, where he stayed for two years after being invited by Elizaveta Petrovna, Empress of Russia in order to create a ceremonial portrait of her. This portrait is today part of the permanent collection of the Hermitage Museum of Saint Petersburg in Russia. In the 1760s he traveled to Denmark and created the portraits of the Danish royal family and taught at the Royal Danish Academy of Fine Arts in Copenhagen.

== Gallery ==
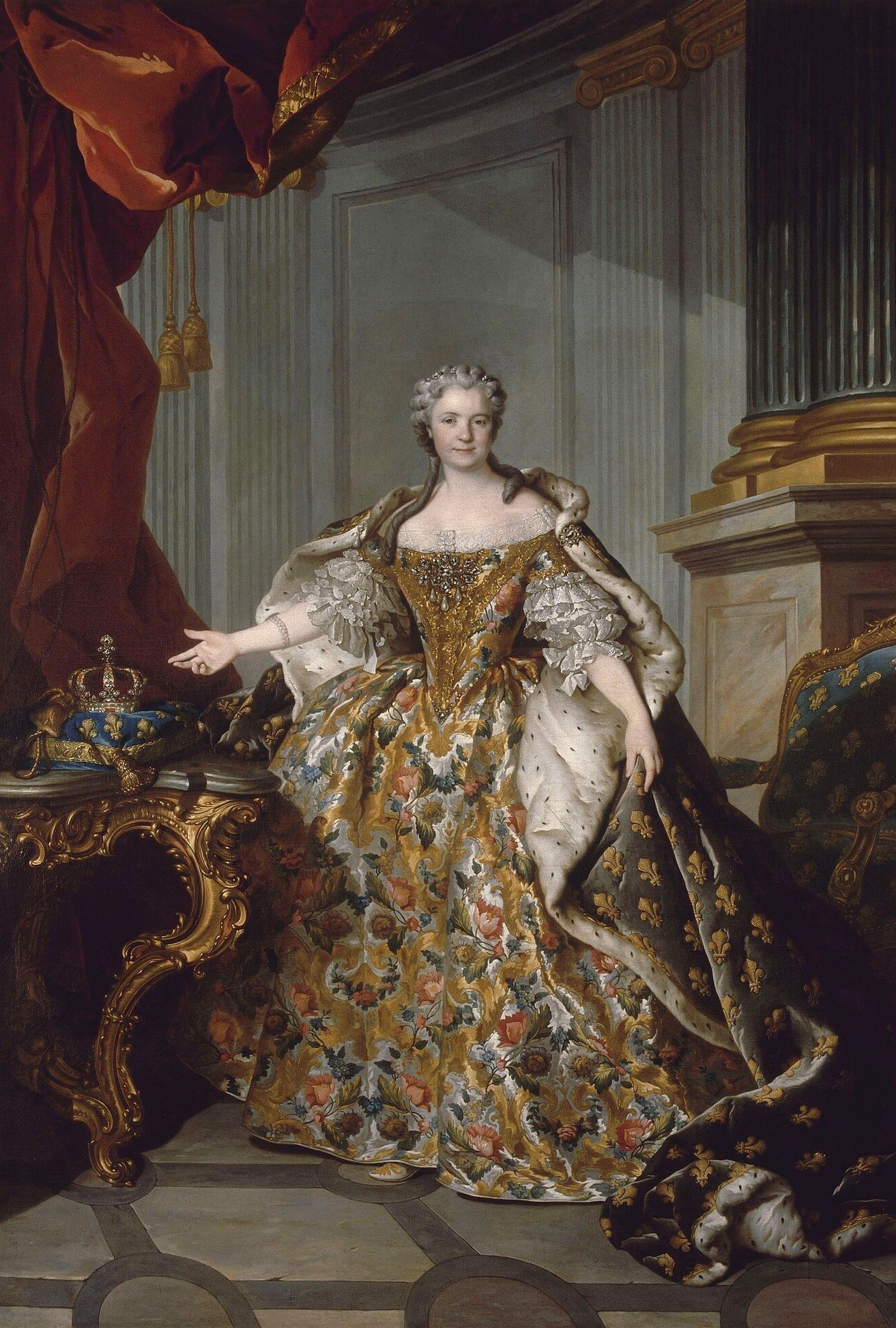
Louis Tocqué, 1740, Portrait of Marie Leszczyńska (1703–1768), Queen of France, oil on canvas, 191 cm × 277 cm (75 in × 109 in), The Louvre, Paris

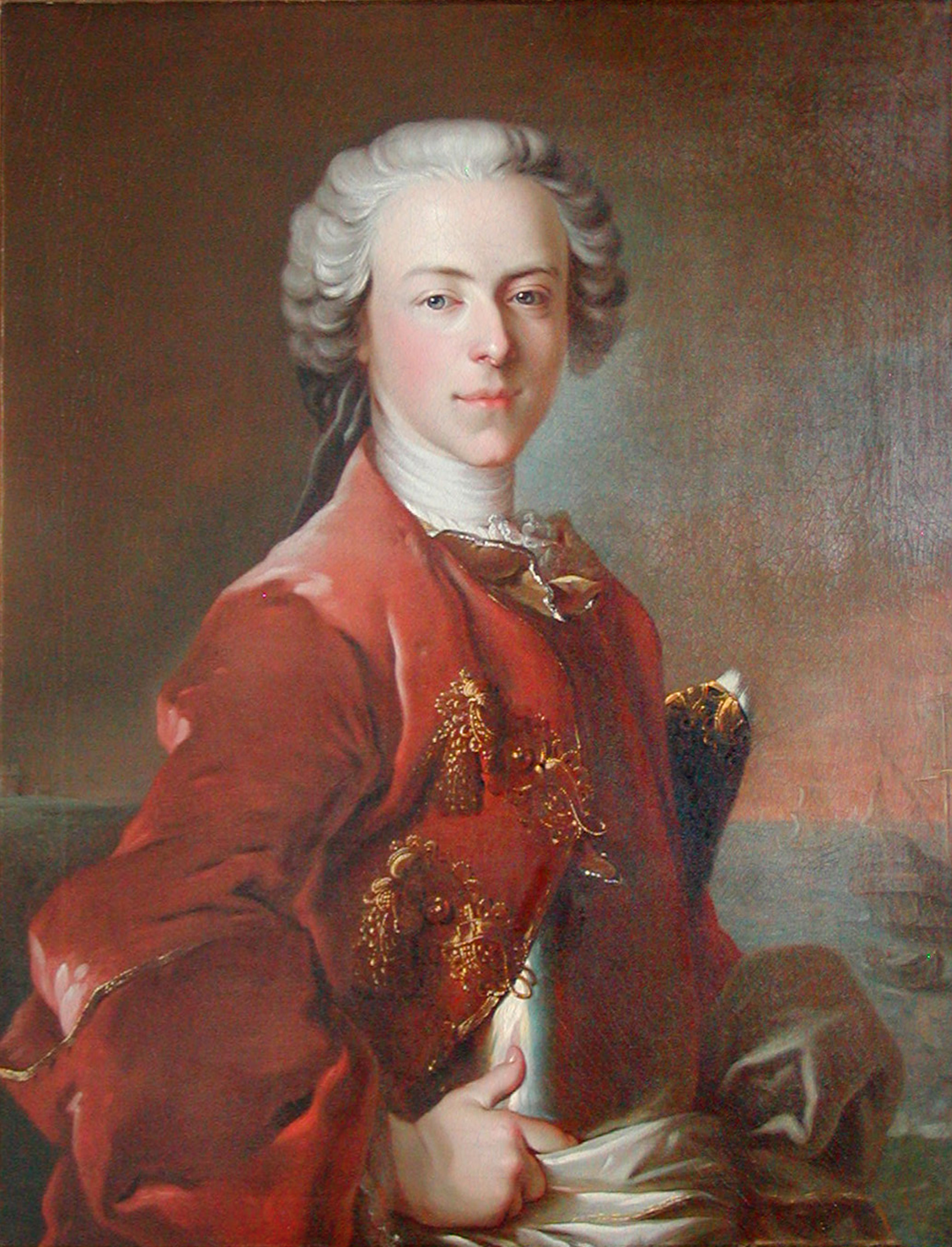
Louis Tocqué, 1736, Portrait of Frederik de Løvenørn (1715–1779), Museum of National History at Frederiksborg Castle, Denmark

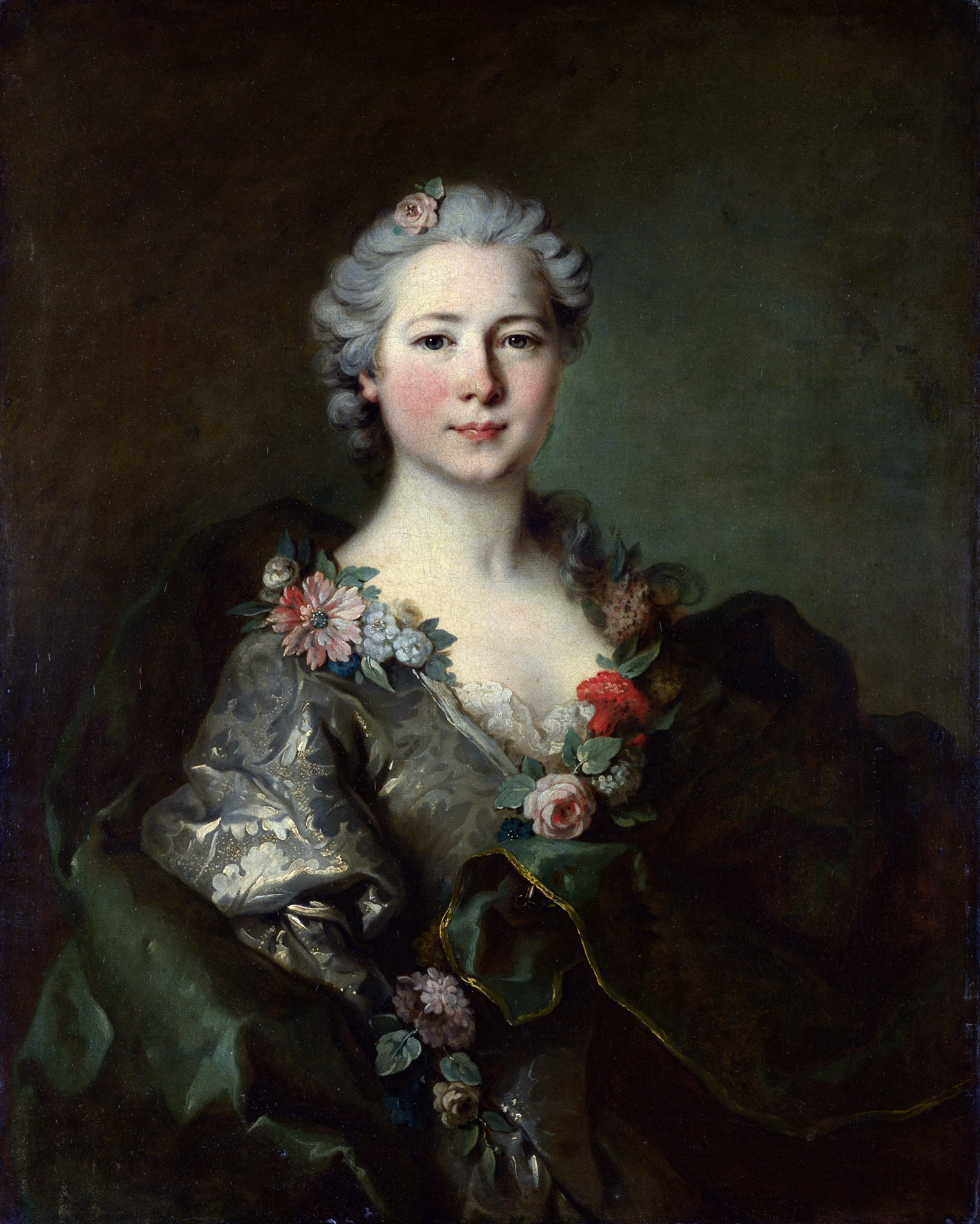
Louis Tocqué, between 1750 and 1759, probably Portrait of Mademoiselle de Coislin, oil on canvas, 79.4 cm × 63.5 cm (31.3 in × 25.0 in), National Gallery, London

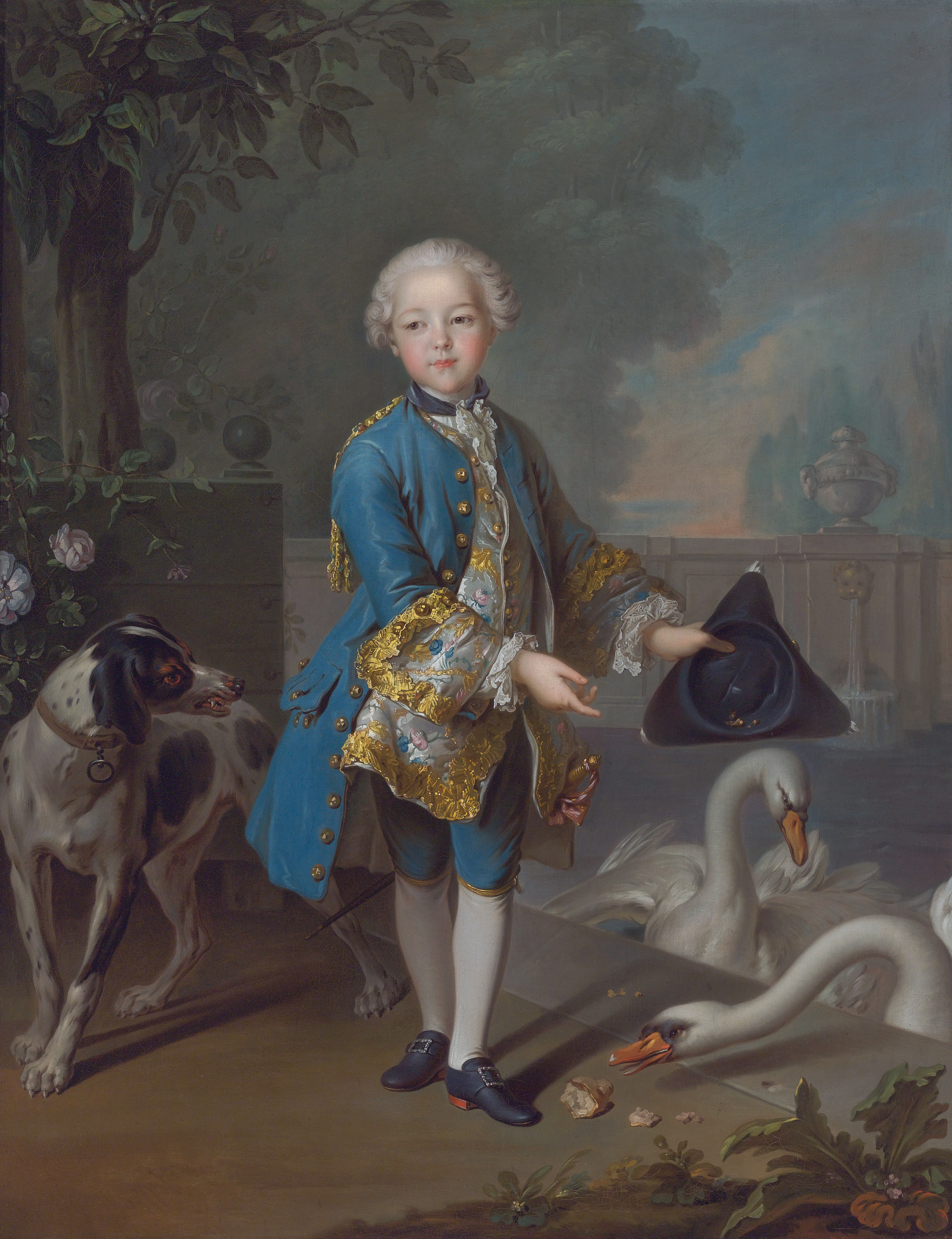
Louis Tocqué, Portrait of Louis Philippe Joseph, Duc d'Orleans and Duc de Chartres (1747–1793), oil on canvas, 146.7 cm × 114.3 cm (57.8 in × 45.0 in)

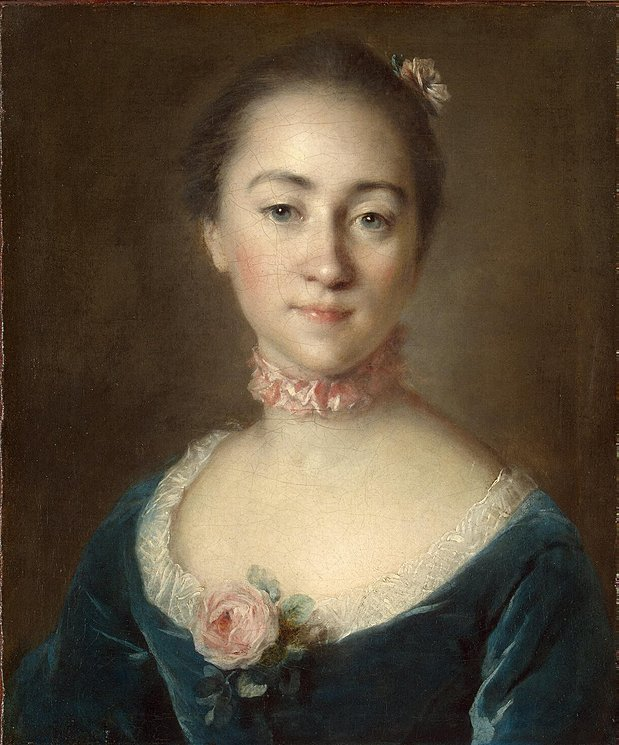
Louis Tocqué, 1757, Portrait of Ekaterina Golovkin (1733–1821), born Shuvalov, Hermitage Museum, Saint Petersburg

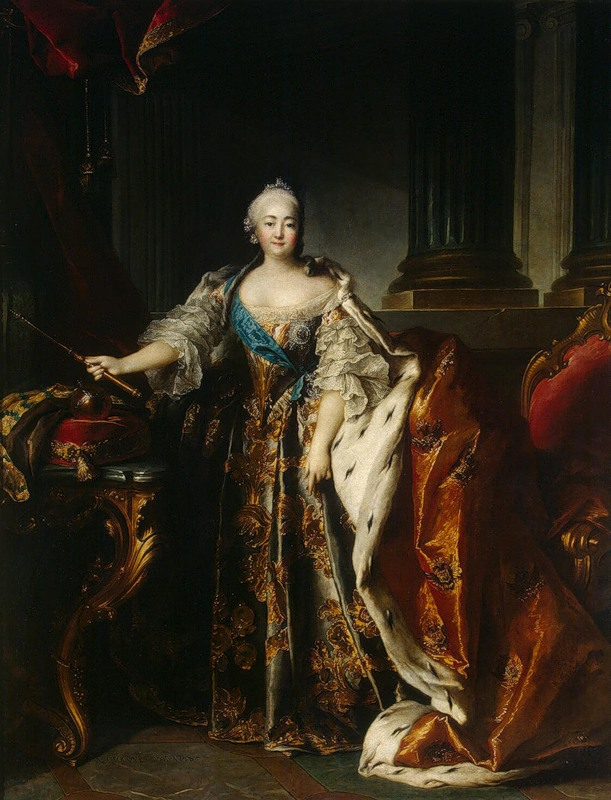
Louis Tocqué, 1758, Portrait of empress Elizabeth of Russia (1708–1762), Hermitage Museum, Saint Petersburg

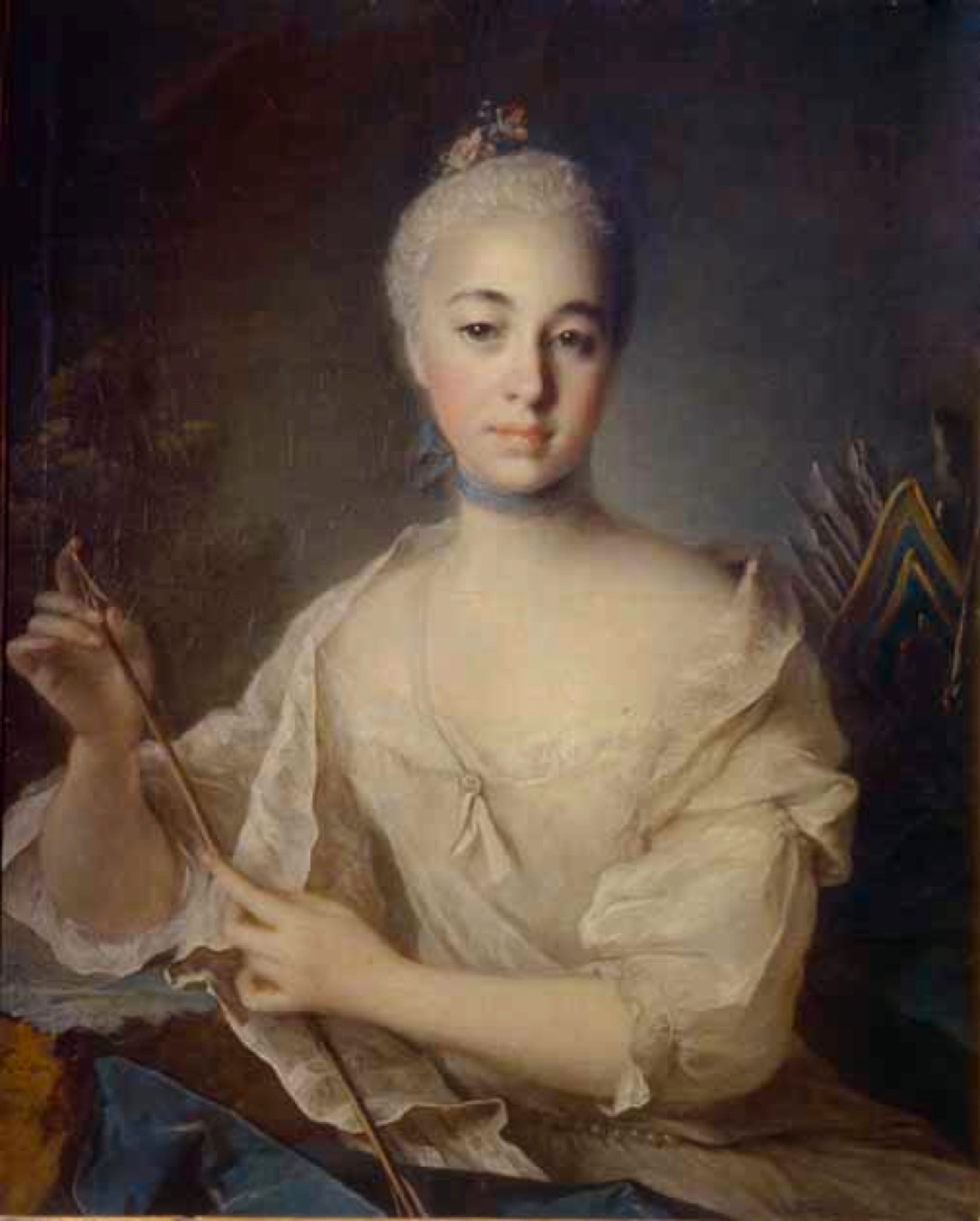
Louis Tocqué, c. 1758, Portrait of Anna Stroganova (1743–1769), State Russian Museum, Saint Petersburg

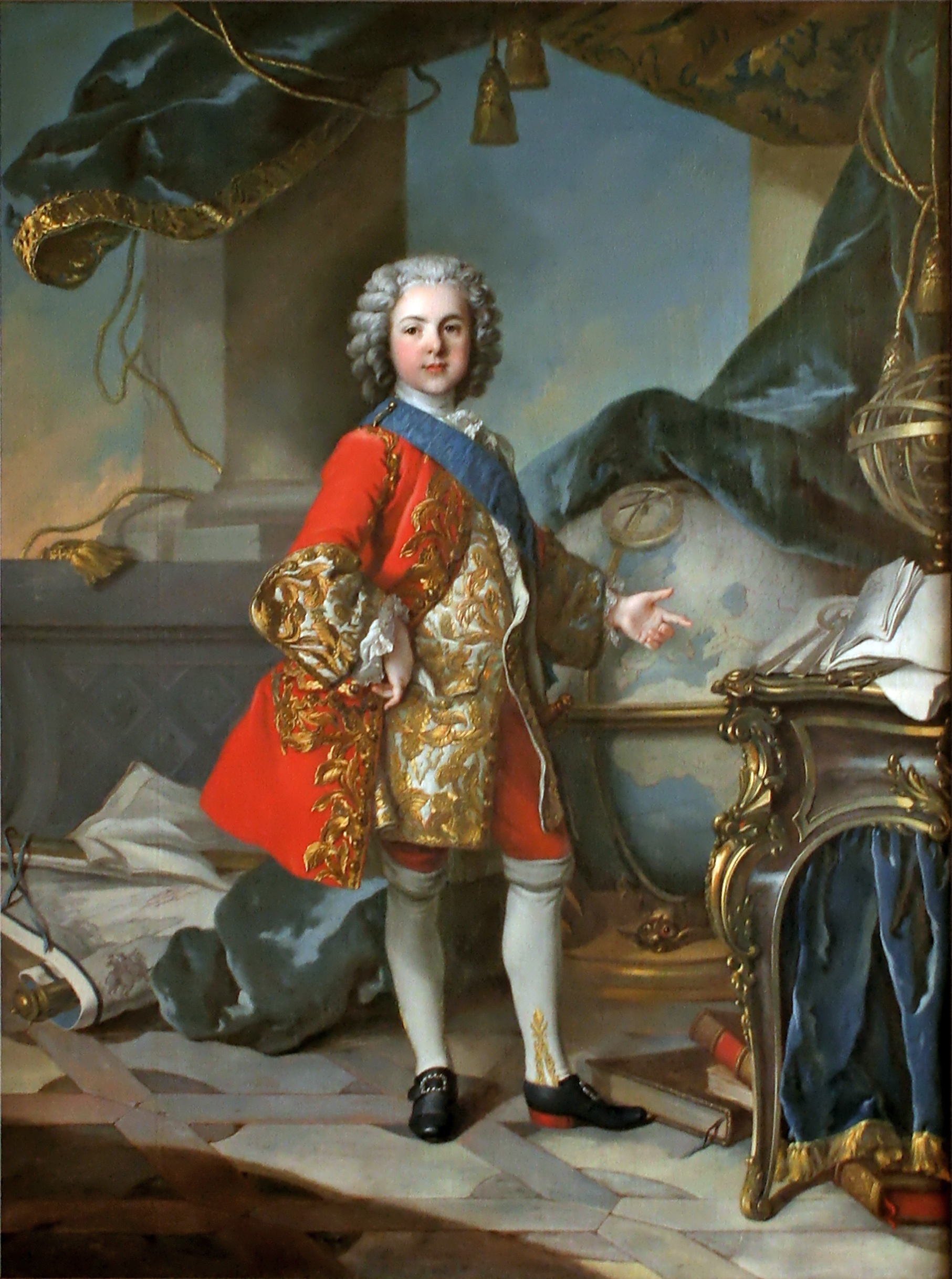
Louis Tocqué, c. 1738, Portrait de Louis de France, Dauphin fils de Louis XV, oil on canvas, 195 x 144 cm (76.8 c 56.7 in), Palace of Versailles

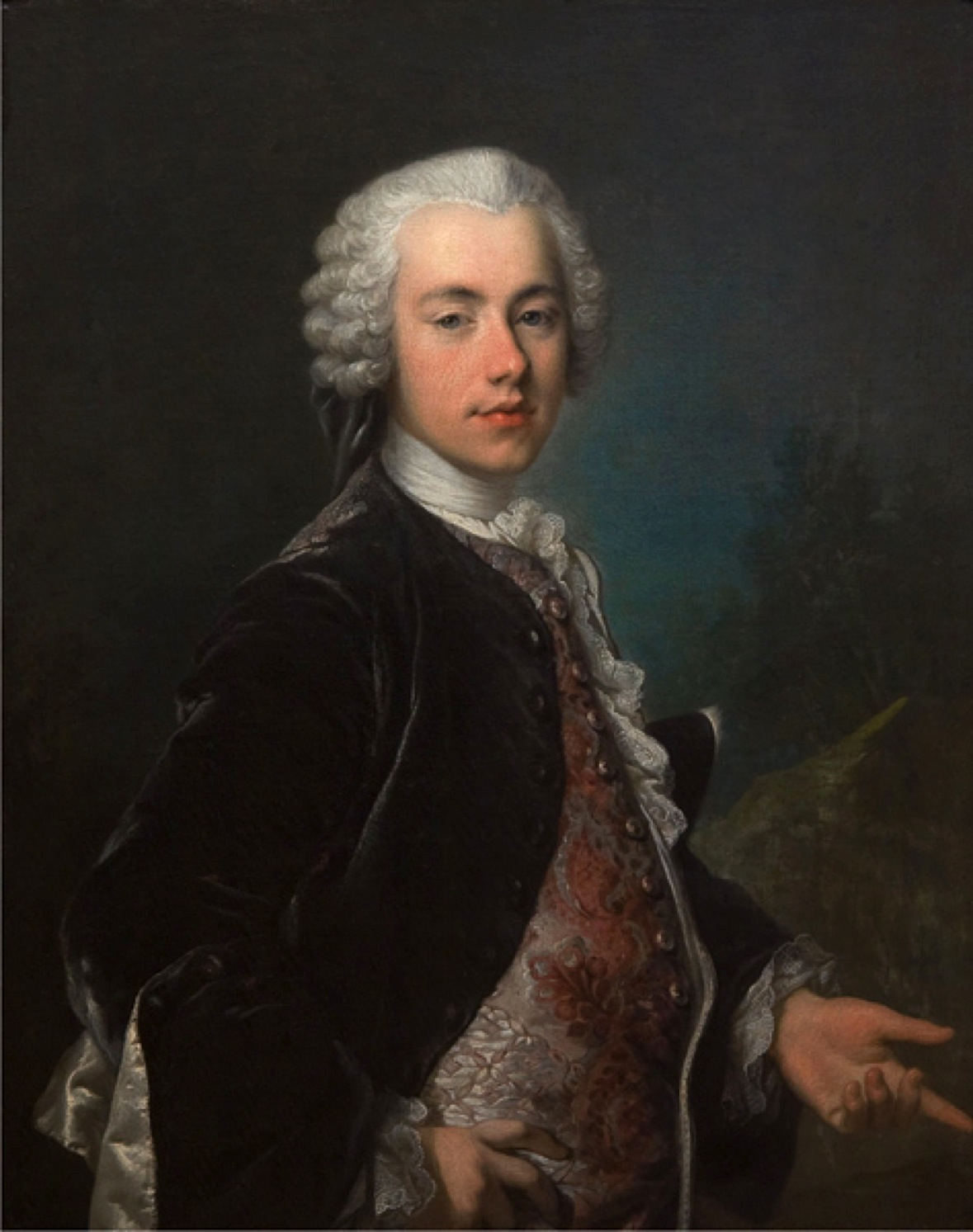
Louis Tocqué, c. 1745, Portrait of Frederik Berregaard, oil on canvas, 92 cm × 73 cm (36 in × 28.5 in), Statens Museum for Kunst

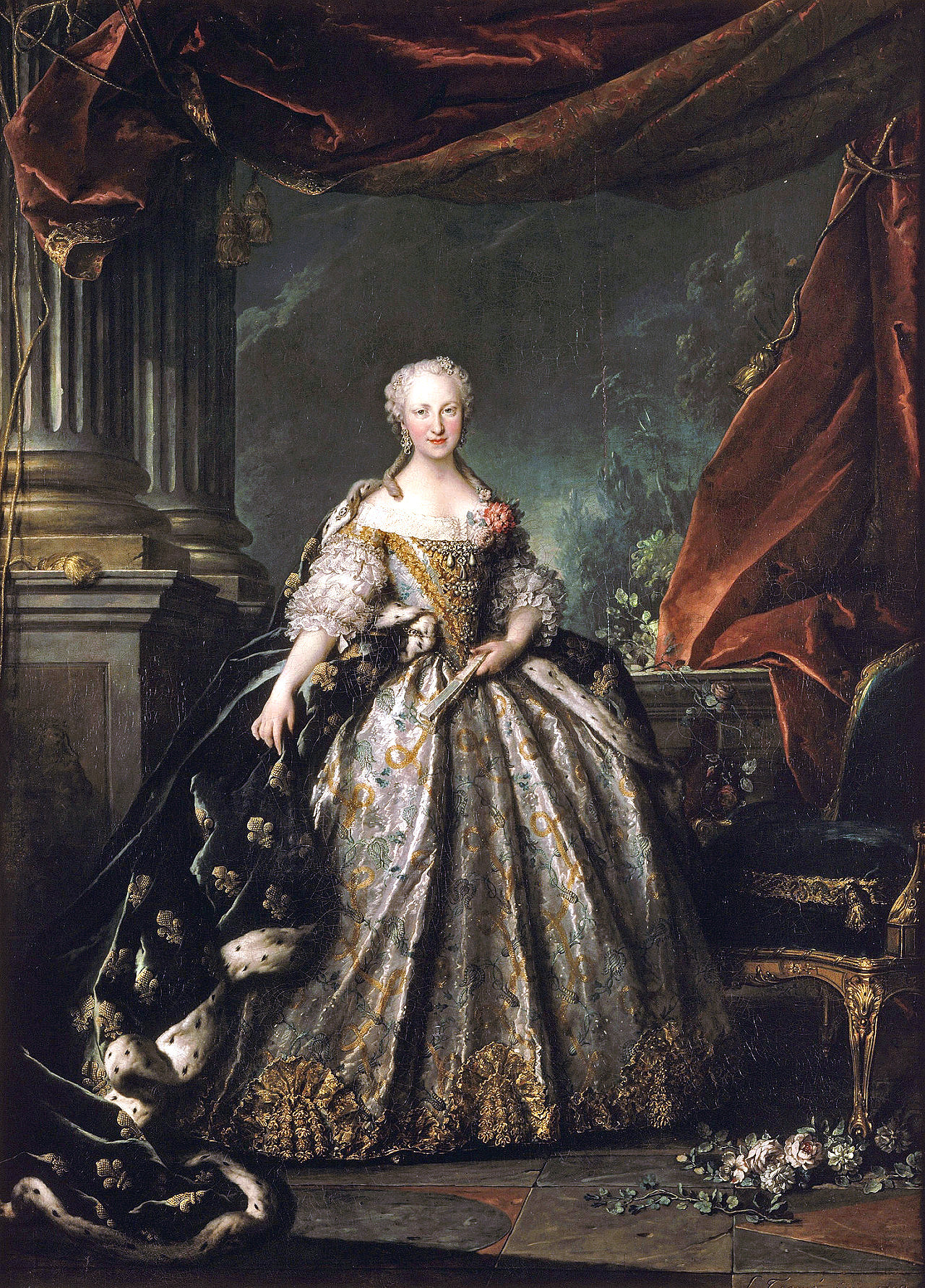
Louis Tocqué, 1745, Portrait of Maria Teresa of Spain (1726–1746) as the Dauphine of France, oil on canvas, 271 cm × 195 cm (106.5 in × 77 in), Palace of Versailles

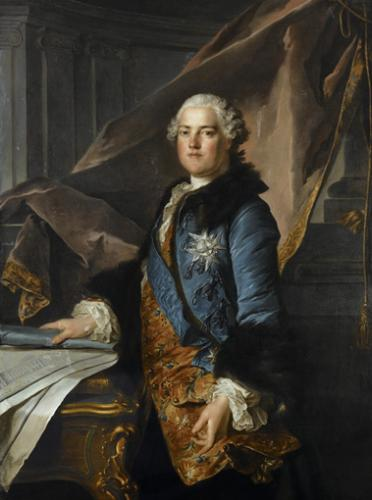
Louis Tocqué, c.1756, Portrait du Marquis de Marigny (1728–1781), oil on canvas, Palace of Versailles

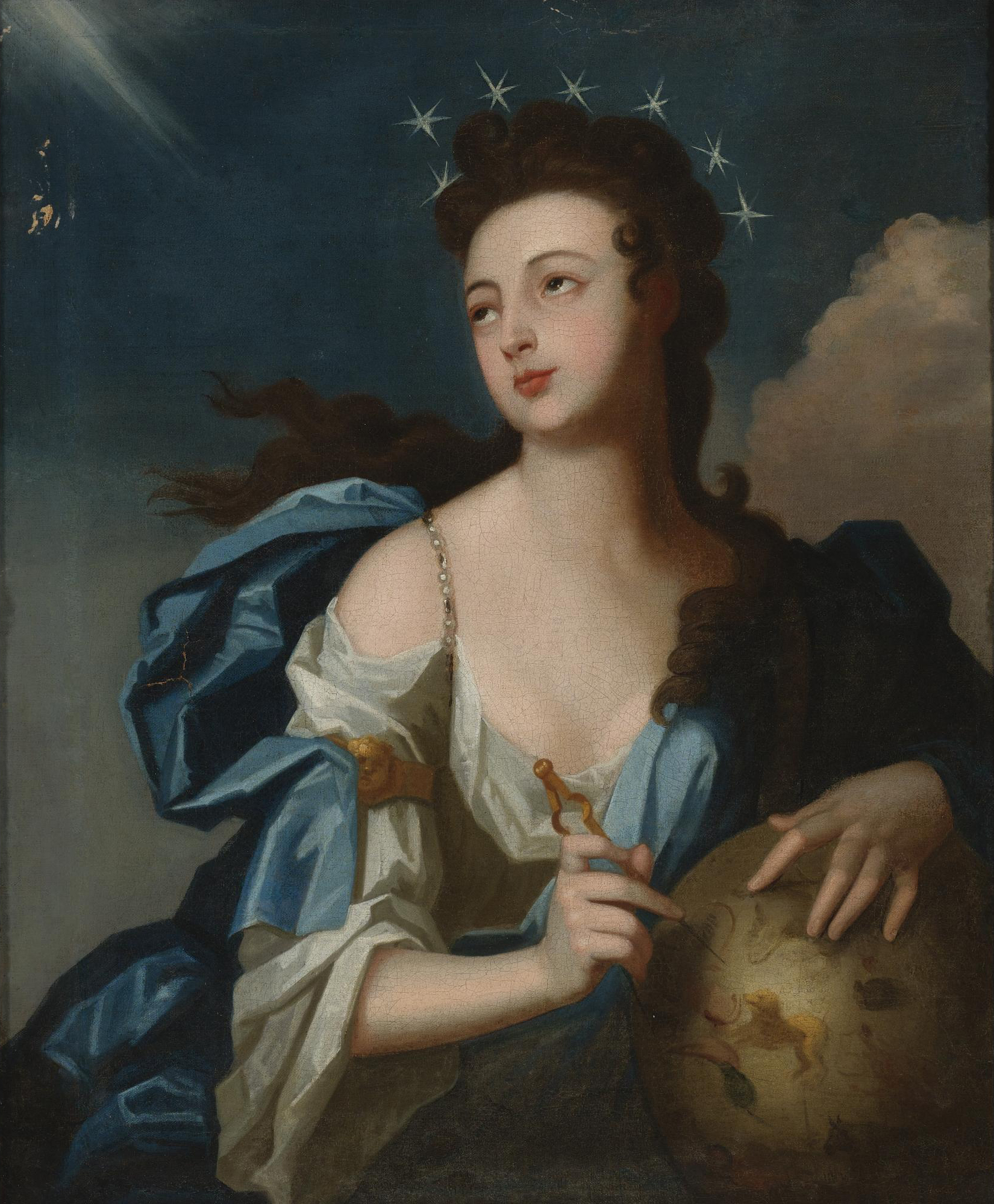
Follower of Louis Tocqué, Allegorical Portrait of Urania, Muse of Astronomy, oil on canvas, 91 x 73,5 cm

== Paintings ==
- Portrait of Louis, Dauphin of France, 1739
- Portrait of Arnoldus van Rijneveld, 1739
- Portrait of Isaac van Rijneveld, 1739
- Portrait of Marie Leszczyńska, 1740
- Portrait of Carl Gustaf Tessin, 1741
- Portrait of Jean Michel de Grilleau
- Portrait of Infanta Maria Teresa Rafaela of Spain, 1745
- Madame Dangé faisant des noeuds, 1753
- Portrait of Mademoiselle de Coislin
- Portrait of Ivan Shuvalov
- Portrait of Ekaterina Golovkina, 1757
- Portrait of Empress Elizabeth Petrovna, 1758
