= Marie Leszczyńska =

Queen of France from 1725 to 1768

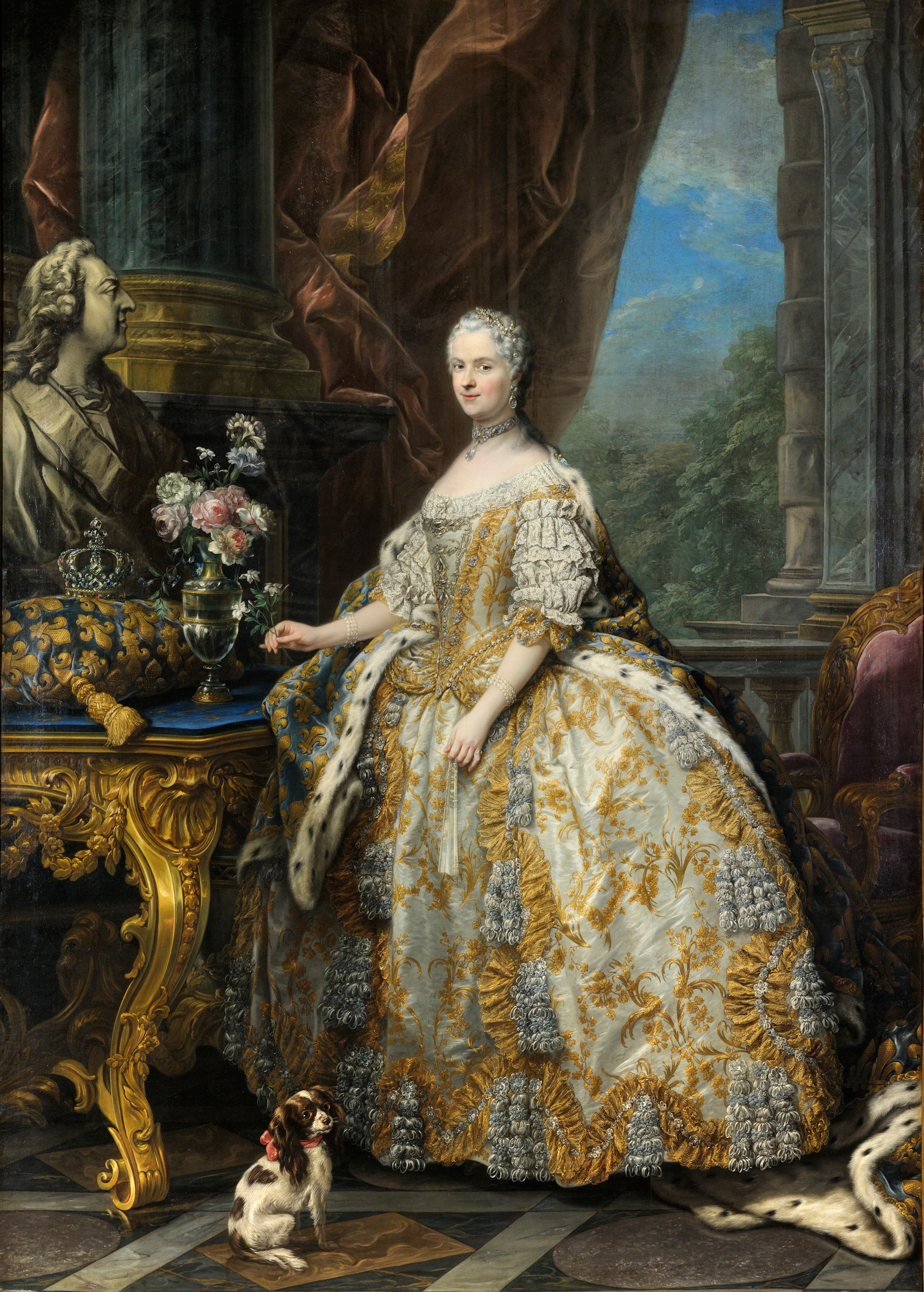
- Portrait by Charles-André van Loo, 1747

Queen consort of France
- Tenure: 4 September 1725 – 24 June 1768
- Born: 23 June 1703; Trzebnica, Silesia, Holy Roman Empire
- Died: 24 June 1768 (aged 65); Palace of Versailles, Kingdom of France
- Burial: Basilica of St Denis, France
- Spouse: Louis XV (m. 1725)
- Issue Detail: Élisabeth, Duchess of Parma; Henriette; Marie Louise; Louis, Dauphin of France; Philippe, Duke of Anjou; Adélaïde, Duchess of Louvois; Victoire; Sophie, Duchess of Louvois; Thérèse; Louise, Prioress of Saint Denis
Names
- Polish: Maria Karolina Zofia Felicja Leszczyńska; French: Marie-Caroline-Sophie-Félicité
- House: Leszczyński
- Father: Stanislaus I Leszczyński
- Mother: Catherine Opalińska
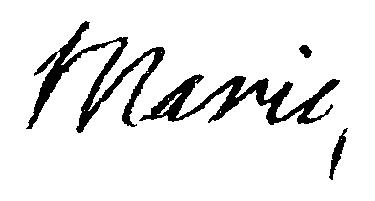
- Signature

Styles of Marie Leszczyńska
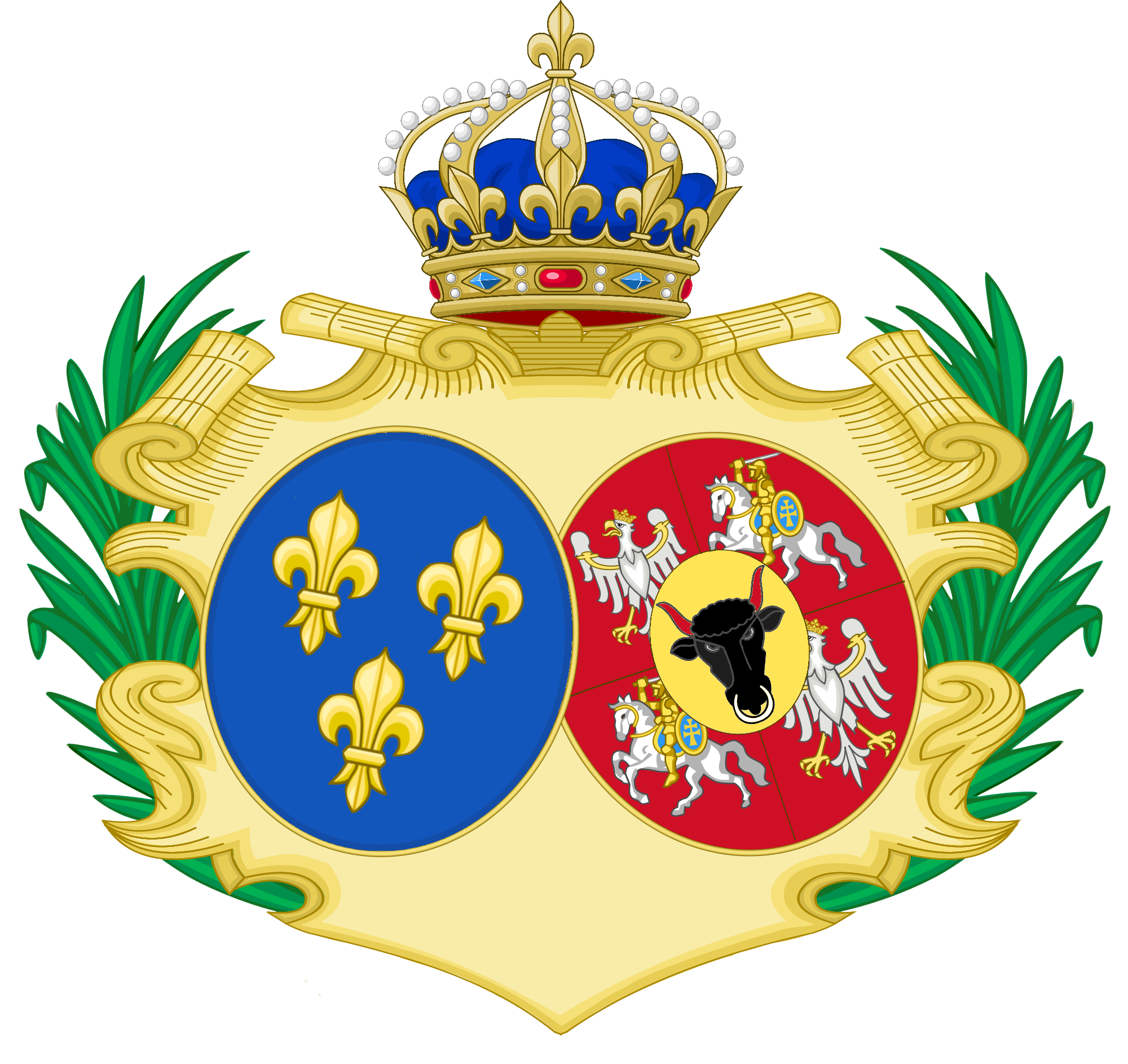
- Reference style: Her Majesty
- Spoken style: Your Majesty
- Alternative style: Most High, Most Potent and Excellent Princess

Marie Leczinska (Note: French: [maʁi lɛɡzɛ̃ska]) (born Maria Karolina Zofia Felicja Leszczyńska (Note: Polish: [ˈmarja lɛʂˈt͡ʂɨj̃ska]); 23 June 1703 – 24 June 1768) was Queen of France as the wife of King Louis XV from their marriage on 4 September 1725 until her death in 1768. The daughter of Stanislaus I Leszczyński, the deposed King of Poland, and Catherine Opalińska, her 42-years and 9 months service was the longest of any queen in French history. A devout Catholic throughout her life, Marie was popular among the French people for her numerous charitable works and introduced many Polish customs to the royal court at Versailles. She was the grandmother of the French kings Louis XVI, Louis XVIII and Charles X.

== Early life ==
Born as a member of the House of Leszczyński, Maria Karolina Zofia Felicja Leszczyńska (Wieniawa) was the second daughter of Stanislaus I Leszczyński and his wife, Countess Catherine Opalińska. She had an elder sister, Anna Leszczyńska, who died of pneumonia in 1717.

Maria's early life was troubled by her father's political misfortune. Ironically, the hopeless political career of King Stanislaus was eventually the reason why his daughter Maria was chosen as the bride of King Louis XV of France. Devoid of political connections, his daughter was viewed by the French as being free from the burden of international alliances.

She was born in Trzebnica in Lower Silesia, the year before her father was made King of Poland by Charles XII of Sweden, who had invaded the country in 1704. In 1709, her father was deposed when the Swedish army lost the military upper hand in Poland, and the family was granted refuge by Charles XII in the Swedish city of Kristianstad in Scania. During the escape, Maria was separated from the rest of her family; she was later found with her nurse hiding in a crib in a stable, although another version claims it was actually a cave in an old mineshaft. In Sweden, the family was welcomed by the queen dowager Hedwig Eleonora of Holstein-Gottorp and became popular members of society life on the estates of the nobility around Kristianstad. In 1712, they made an official visit to Medevi, the spa of the Queen Dowager. During this period in her life, Maria began speaking Swedish with a Scanian accent. As Queen of France, she was known to welcome Swedish ambassadors to France with the phrase "Welcome, Dearest Heart!" in Swedish.

In 1714, Charles XII gave them permission to live in his fiefdom of Zweibrücken in the Holy Roman Empire, where they were supported by the income of Zweibrücken: they lived there until the death of Charles XII in 1718. Zweibrücken then passed to a cousin of his. These lands were parallel to the confiscated Polish properties of Stanislaus. Stanislaus appealed to the Regent of France, the Duke of Orléans, and the Duke of Lorraine for help, with the Queen of Sweden acting as his mediator.

In 1718, with the support of the Duke of Lorraine, the family was allowed to settle in Wissembourg in the province of Alsace, which had been annexed by France, a place suggested by Philippe II, Duke of Orléans, a nephew of Louis XIV and Regent of the Kingdom of France during Louis XV's minority. The family lived a modest life in a large town house at the expense of the French Regent.

Their lifestyle in Wissembourg was regarded as very below standard for a royal at that time; they lived in a small house, and could not pay the salary of their small retinue from which a few "served as an apology for a guard of honour", and the jewels of the former Queen Catherine were reportedly held as security by a moneylender.

While her mother Catherine and grandmother Anna Leszczyńska reportedly suffered from a certain degree of bitterness over their exile and loss of position which worsened their relationship with Stanislaus, whom they occasionally blamed for their exile, Maria was close to her father and spent a lot of time conversing with him, though she was evidently of a different nature as she "possessed the gift of suffering in silence and of never wearying others with her troubles" and was said to have developed "a profound and intense piety", which gave "to her youthful mind the maturity of a woman who no longer demands happiness".

== Marriage ==
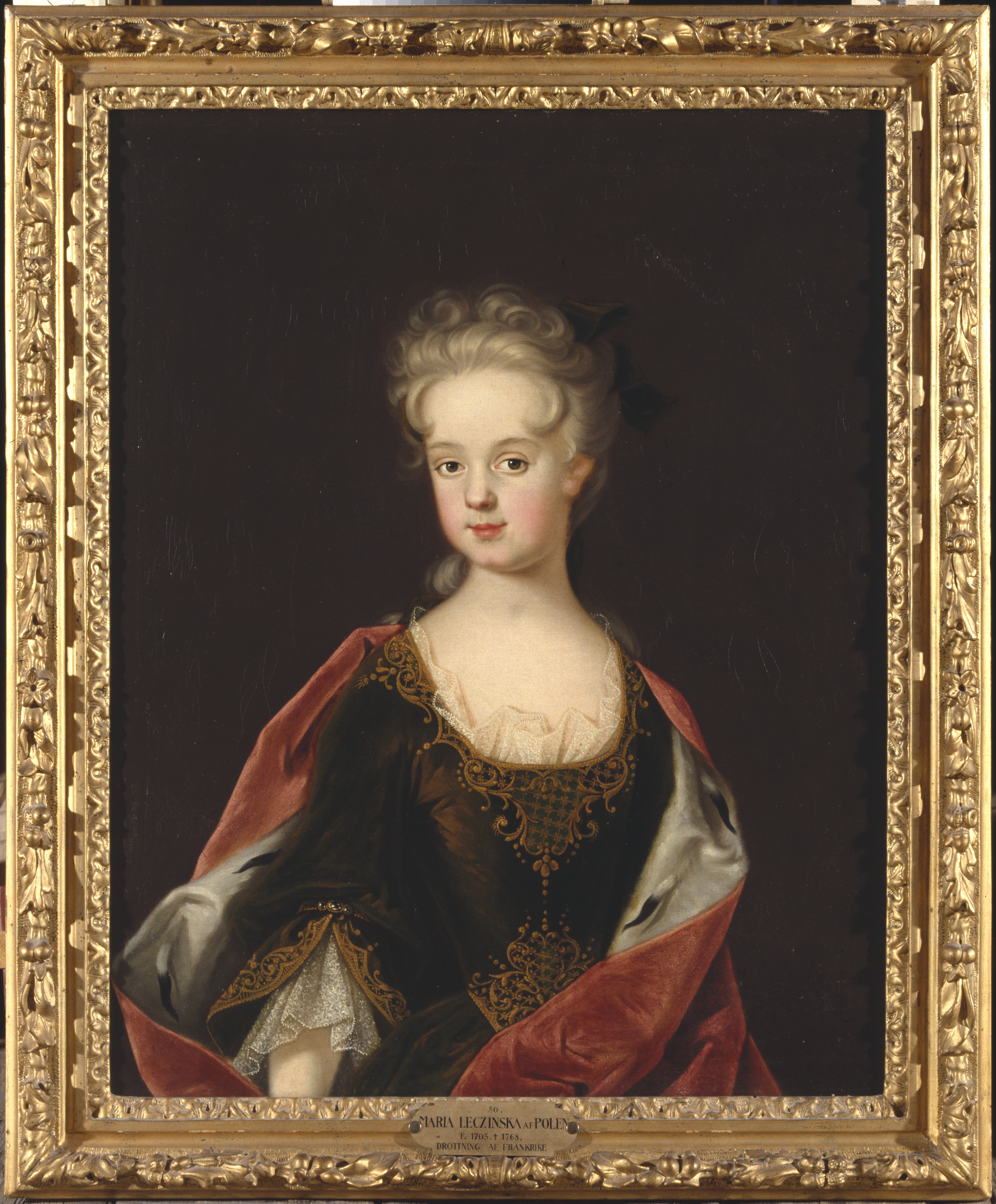
The young Marie, known at the time as Princess Maria, in 1712 (portrait by Johan Starbus)

=== Early negotiations ===
Maria was not described as a beauty; instead her characteristics in the marriage market were stated as those of being pleasant, well-educated, and graceful in manner and movement. In 1720, she was suggested as a bride to Louis Henri de Bourbon, Prince of Condé (who preferred to be known as the Duke of Bourbon, rather than Prince of Condé), but her intended mother-in-law Louise Françoise de Bourbon refused to give her consent. The cavalry regiment provided by the Regent for the family's protection included the officer Marquis de Courtanvaux, who fell in love with Maria and asked the Regent to make him a duke so that he might ask for her hand, but the Regent refused and because of his low rank the marriage was impossible. Louis George, Margrave of Baden-Baden, and the third Prince of Baden were suggested, but these suggestions came to nothing because of her insufficient dowry. Stanislaus unsuccessfully tried to arrange a marriage for her with the Count of Charolais, brother of the Duke of Bourbon. In 1724, Count d'Argensson proposed she marry the new Duke of Orléans, but her intended mother-in-law Françoise Marie de Bourbon wished for a dynastic match with political advantage.

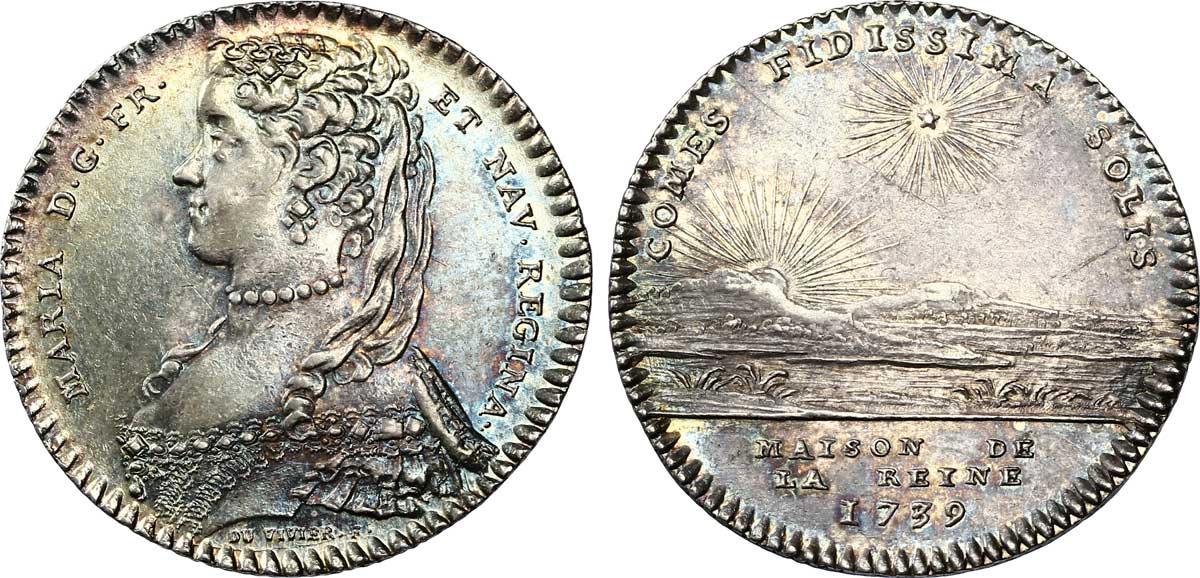
Marie Leszczyńska on a coin

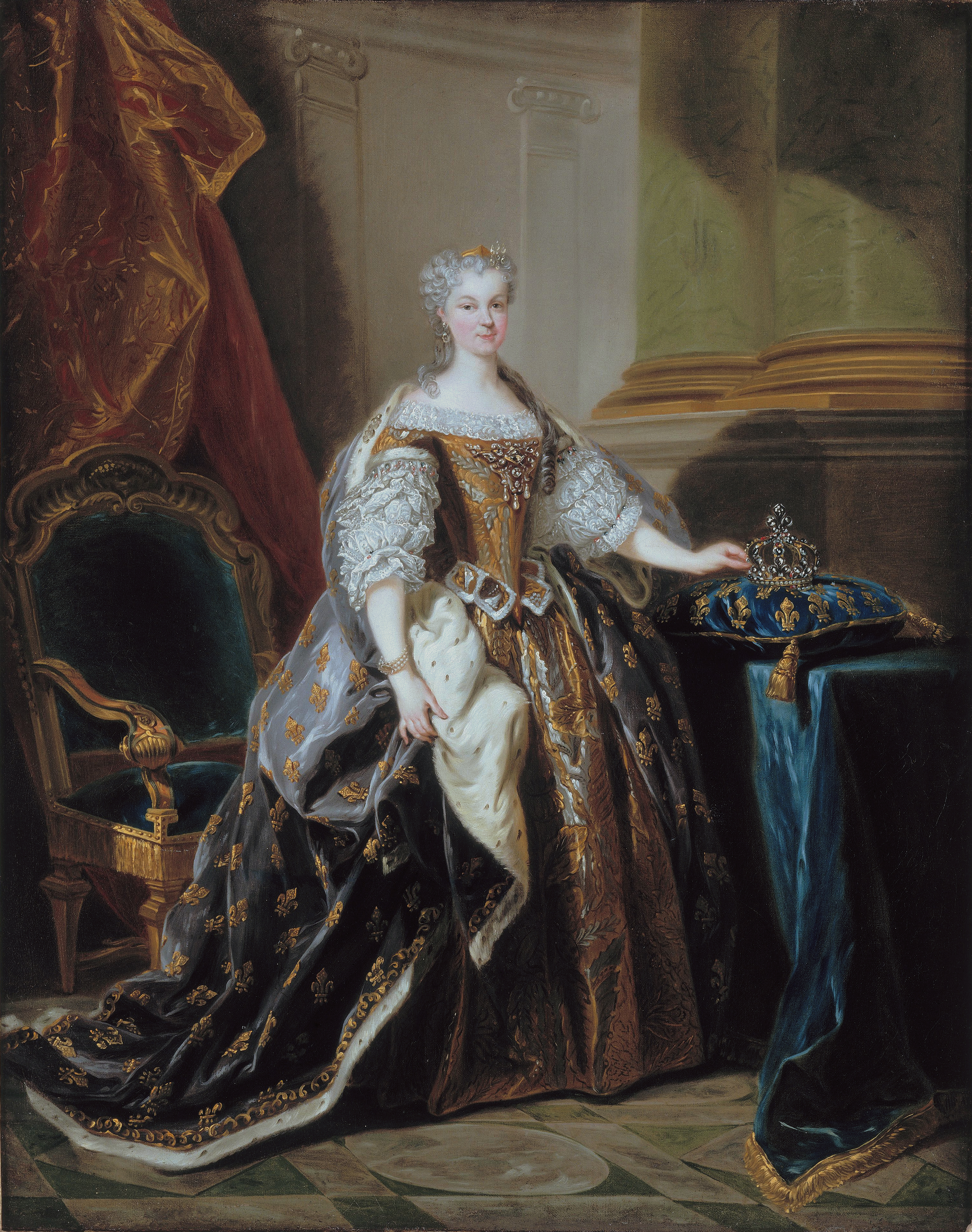
Maria Leszczyńska pictured in 1725; the year she became queen of France (portrait by Jean-Baptiste van Loo)

In 1723, the Duke of Bourbon had become the Regent of France during the minority of Louis XV. The Regent was dominated by his lover, Madame de Prie. There were lengthy negotiations for a marriage between Maria and the now widowed Duke of Bourbon: Madame de Prie favored the match, as she did not perceive the reputedly unattractive Maria as a threat to her. The marriage negotiations, however, were soon overshadowed when a marriage for King Louis XV, then aged fifteen, was given priority. That year, he fell ill and, fearing the consequences of the unmarried King dying without an heir, the Duc suggested getting him married as soon as possible. He was already engaged to Infanta Mariana Victoria of Spain, who had been brought to France as his future wife some years earlier. As she was only five years old, there would be no issue expected for many years. When the king became sick, it was feared he might die without an heir and that the throne would pass to the Orléans line. This was an undesirable prospect for the Duke of Bourbon, who preferred that the throne should pass to the Spanish line rather than to the Orléans line. Louis XV's engagement was broken off and the Infanta was sent back to Spain, to the chagrin of the Spanish. The Duke of Bourbon and Madame de Prie began negotiations for the immediate marriage of the King to Maria.

=== Negotiations for marriage to the King ===
Maria Leszczyńska was on a list of 99 European princesses considered eligible to marry the young King. Maria was not the first choice on the list. She had been placed there initially because she was a Catholic princess and therefore fulfilled the minimum criteria, but was removed early on when the list was reduced from 99 to 17 for being too poor.

However, the candidates preferred to her were all eventually discarded from the list for a number of different reasons. Among the serious candidates were Landgravine Caroline of Hesse-Rotenburg; removed "on account of her bad temper"; Elizabeth of Russia; removed because of her mother's commoner background; Barbara of Portugal; removed because of the bad health of her family; Princess Charlotte Amalie of Denmark; removed because it could cause conflict with France's ally Sweden; Elisabeth Therese of Lorraine; removed because the House of Lorraine was too closely related to the Habsburgs; and Enrichetta d'Este; removed because of the disorderly situation within her family.

When the list of 17 was further reduced to four, the preferred choices still presented numerous problems. Anne and Amelia of Great Britain, who were considered with the understanding that they would convert to the Catholic faith upon marriage, were favored by the Duke of Bourbon and Madame de Prie because they were supported by their political financiers, the firm of Paris Brothers. Cardinal Fleury easily prevented the British match because of religious reasons. The other two women on the list were the sisters of the Duke of Bourbon, Henriette-Louise and Élisabeth-Alexandrine, whom the King refused to marry because of the disapproval of Cardinal Fleury. Cardinal Fleury favored a match with Princess Charlotte of Hesse-Rheinfels-Rotenburg, which was supported by the maternal grandfather of Louis XV, the King of Sardinia through his spy Maria Vittoria of Savoy, Princess of Carignan.

In these complicated disputes over the choice of a royal marriage partner, Maria Leszczyńska eventually emerged as a choice acceptable to both the party of the Duke of Bourbon and Madame de Prie, as well as the party of Cardinal Fleury, mainly because she was politically uncontroversial and lacked any of the alliances which could harm either party. At this point, there were already negotiations of marriage between Maria and the Duke of Bourbon. The Duke of d'Argensson had already left a favorable report of her, and the groundwork had been done. Cardinal Fleury accepted the choice as Maria posed no threat to him because of her lack of connections, while the Duke of Bourbon and Madame de Prie, precisely because she lacked any personal power base, expected her to be indebted to them for her position. Maria was finally chosen because she was a healthy adult Catholic princess ready to procreate immediately after the wedding. Reportedly, Madame de Prie had a flattering portrait painted of Maria, in which she was deliberately made to look like the King's favorite portrait of his mother. When he was shown the portrait, he was impressed and exclaimed: "She is the loveliest of them all!" and became enthusiastic of the match, an episode which attracted some attention.

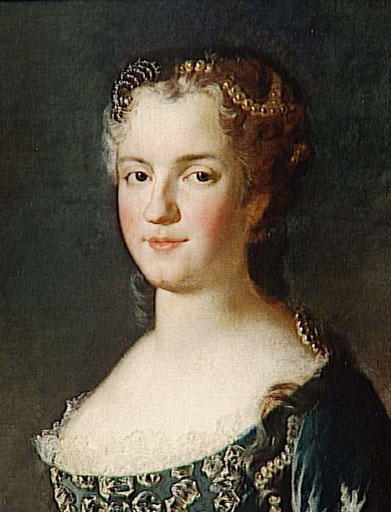
Portrait by Alexis Simon Belle

The formal proposal was made on 2 April 1725. The announcement of the wedding was not received well at the royal court. Maria's father Stanislaus had been a monarch for only a short time and she was thought to be a poor choice and of inferior status, not worthy of being queen of France. The Duchess of Lorraine, sister of the former Duke of Orléans was also insulted that her own daughter Elisabeth-Therese had not been chosen. The nobility and the court looked upon the future queen as an upstart intruder, the ministers as a cause to diplomatic trouble with Spain and Russia, whose princesses had been refused in favor of Maria, and the general public was also reportedly initially dissatisfied with the fact that France would gain "from this marriage neither glory nor honor, riches nor alliances."

There were rumors before the wedding that the bride was ugly, epileptic and sterile. On 6 May 1725, Maria was forced to undergo a medical examination, which ruled out epilepsy and also gave reassuring reports about her menstruation and ability to procreate. In the marriage contract, the same terms were given to her as were previously given to the Spanish Infanta, and she was thus guaranteed fifty thousand crowns for rings and jewelry, two hundred and fifty thousand crowns upon her wedding, and the further guarantee of an annual widow allowance of twenty thousand crowns.

=== Private relationship to Louis XV ===
The marriage by proxy took place on 15 August 1725 in the Cathedral of Strasbourg, Louis XV being represented by his cousin, the Duke of Orléans Louis le Pieux. For her marriage, Maria's Polish name was changed to the French Marie. Despite her surname being difficult for the French to pronounce, it was still often used by commoners. She was escorted by Mademoiselle de Clermont, seven ladies-in-waiting, two maids-of-honour, numerous equerries and pages in a long train of coaches; however, she was not welcomed by triumphal entries, diplomatic greetings or the other official celebrations, as was normally the custom upon the arrival of a foreign princess for a royal marriage. Marie made a good impression upon the public from the beginning, such as when she handed out largesse on her way to her wedding in Fontainebleau.

Louis and Marie first met on the eve of their wedding on 4 September 1725 at the Château de Fontainebleau. Marie was twenty-two years old and Louis fifteen. The couple were reported to have fallen in love at first sight, based on eyewitness accounts such as those of Cardinal de Rohan's letter and that of the Duke de Bourbon who were present when they met. Their relationship was very happy and idyllic at first and for eight years Louis XV was faithful to his wife and even compared Marie's beauty to that of Blanche of Castile. The Duke de Richelieu, best friend of the King, noted in his memoirs that Louis XV had a "true passion" for Marie Leczinska and at first resisted the idea of taking a mistress while his wife was pregnant. He had been impatient to marry her, was reportedly flattered to have a twenty-two-year-old wife, and refused to allow criticism of her appearance.

In August 1727, at Versailles, Marie gave birth to twins, named Louise Élisabeth and Anne Henriette. The King was delighted, declaring that, after it had been said that he could not become a father, he had become the father of two. His first minister, Cardinal Fleury, however, was displeased and decided that until the Queen had given birth to a son she could not be allowed to accompany the King on his trips but had to stay at Versailles. A year later, to the King's disappointment, another daughter, Marie Louise, was born. The long-awaited dauphin, Louis, was born on 4 September 1729 to the relief of a country whose royal family had had a history of failing to establish a secure male line of succession.

Marie had ten live children, seven of whom survived to adulthood. They all regarded her as a model of virtue, particularly her daughters. Marie, being of a phlegmatic nature, was not known to show them much affection. However, numerous contemporary accounts such as her own children's letters show a caring and attentive mother. Close friends such as the Duke de Luynes and lady in waiting Marechale de Mouchy or the Barrister Barbier noted in their memoirs that "the Queen loved her children tenderly" and was said to be giving them "hugs and kisses" and supervise their education. She would also conduct and regularly send gifts and write letters to her younger daughters whom she was forbidden to see at Fontevraud. According to the diaries, Marie Leczinska consoled her children on their personal problems and physically nursed them whenever they were ill.

Marie was regarded as plain and slender in appearance by her contemporaries but with a fresh and healthy complexion. That faded with age but piety precluded her from using artificial means to make herself look attractive. She was described as shy and reserved in the company of her husband. She considered it her duty to show him gratitude and reverence but was unable to relax enough to entertain him or to flirt with him. Once, for example, she could find no other way to entertain him than to suggest that he kill the flies in the window panes.

Louis XV, who suffered from melancholy and boredom, became inclined to listen when Marie was unfavorably compared to other women, and Cardinal Fleury, who wished to prevent Marie from eventually getting any influence over the King, favored the idea of the King taking a mistress as long as she was apolitical.

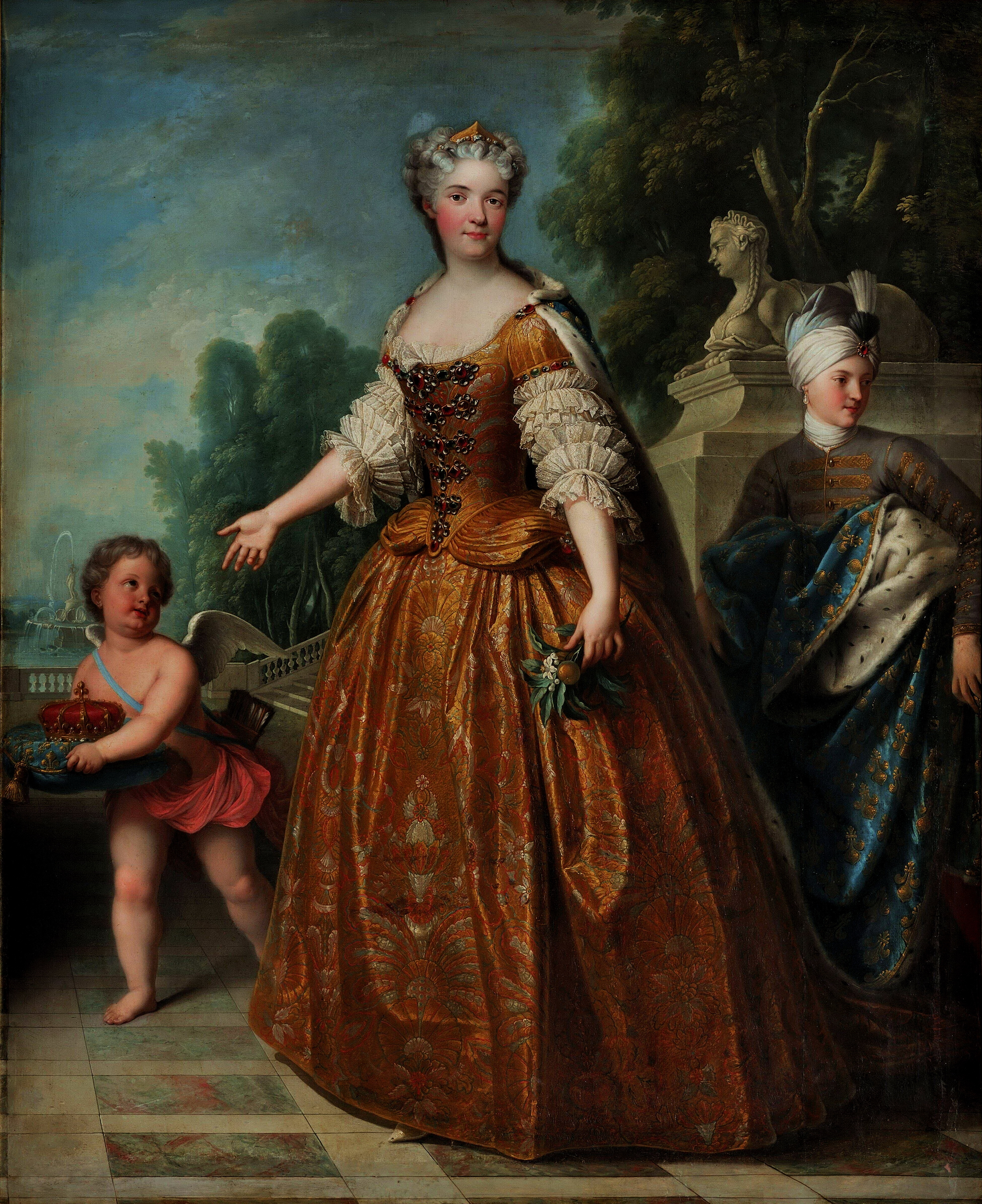
La reine de France, Marie Leszczynska en grand costume de cour. This portrait exhibits Queen Marie attired in a gold brocade gown, wearing a fleur-delysé coat (portrait by François-Albert Stiémart)

Louis XV eventually became a notorious womanizer. In 1733, he entered into his first affair with Louise Julie de Mailly; until 1737, this relationship was not official, and she was known at court as the Fair Unknown. During these years, Marie unsuccessfully tried to figure out who the mistress was and did display her displeasure over the state of affairs. However, the adultery had the support of Cardinal Fleury because de Mailly was not interested in politics, and after the first years of the king's adultery, Marie became resigned to it. After the difficult birth of Princess Louise in 1737, which nearly took her life, Marie was advised by the doctors that another pregnancy may end her life, and from 1738, she refused Louis entrance to her bedroom.

In parallel with this, Louise Julie de Mailly was officially recognized as the King's royal mistress and favorite at court, and the relationship between the King and Queen soured, though they continued to perform their ceremonial roles side by side. The King paid only purely ceremonial visits to her rooms and no longer participated in her card games. The court, wary of her loss of the King's affection, only attended to her when court representation required it. Louise Julie de Mailly was followed by Pauline Félicité de Mailly in 1739, Marie Anne de Mailly in 1742 and Diane Adélaïde de Mailly also in 1742. During the serious illness of Louis XV in Metz in August 1744, when he was believed to be dying, Marie was given his permission to join him. She was cheered by the supporting public along her journey, but when she arrived, he no longer wished to see her. She and the clergy supported the idea of the King exiling his mistress Marie Anne de Mailly including her sister, and the idea that the King should make a public apology for his adultery, but this did not improve their marriage.

Madame de Pompadour was presented at court in 1745 and was given such an important and influential position at court until her death in 1764 that she somewhat eclipsed the Queen. The lovers of Louis were often given positions in the court of Marie in order for them to have permanent access and an official excuse to remain at court, which placed Marie in a difficult position. She regarded the first official mistress Louise Julie de Mailly as the most hurtful because she was the first; however, she disliked Marie Anne de Mailly on a more personal level because Marie Anne was haughty and insolent. In contrast to the other official mistresses, Marie had a moderately friendly and cordial relationship to Madame de Pompadour, who always treated the Queen with deference and respect, though Marie did unsuccessfully oppose Pompadour's appointment as a lady-in-waiting in 1756. In contrast, Marie seems never to have had extramarital relations.

== Queen of France ==
=== Political role ===
Queen Marie never managed to develop political influence and instead focused on numerous charitable activities such giving money, edible foods, medicines as well as sewing and making clothes to the poor which was appreciated by ordinary Frenchmen. After her marriage, her appointed court consisted of a great number of followers of the Duke of Bourbon, among them Madame de Prie, the Duchess de Béthune, and the Marquise de Matignon, who, among her twelve ladies-in-waiting or dame du palais, the Duke's own sister, Marie Anne de Bourbon, became her Surintendante de la Maison de la Reine and Paris de Verney was appointed as her secretary. Cardinal de Fleury, who had been Louis's tutor, was appointed her grand almoner.

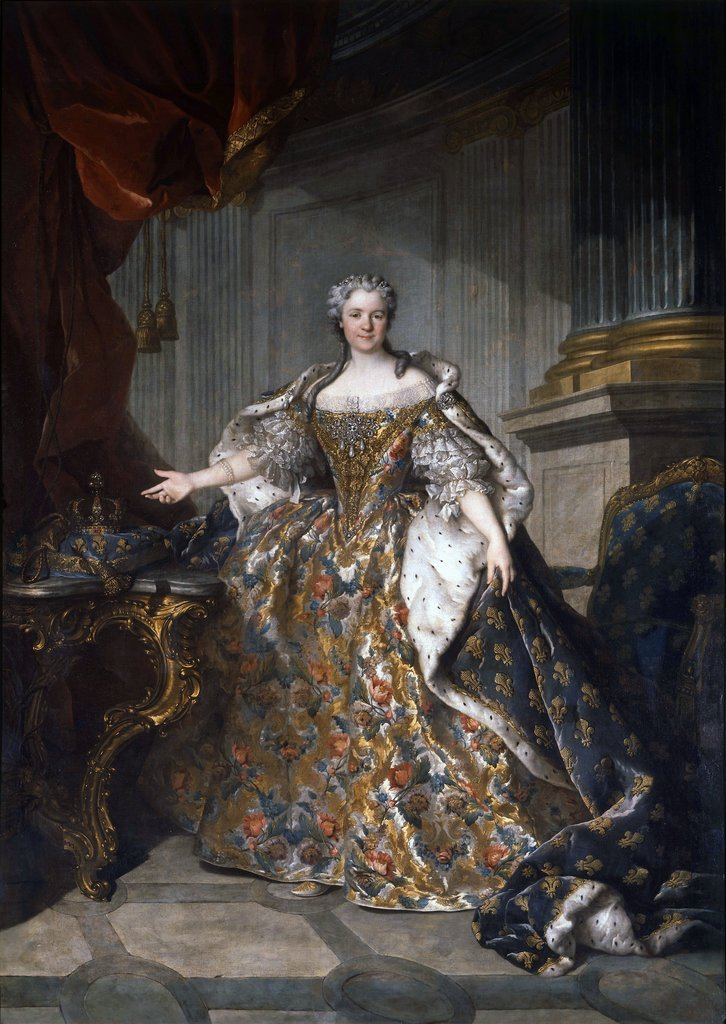
Marie Leszczyńska wearing a blue cloak with the Fleur-di-Lis embroidered on the cloak (portrait by Louis Tocqué, c. 1740)

Marie had been given advice by her father to always loyally stand by the Duke of Bourbon, to whom she owed her marriage and position, and it was a favor to the Duke that Marie made her first attempt to interfere in politics. On 17 December 1725 the Duke of Bourbon, Madame de Prie and Paris de Verney attempted to banish Cardinal de Fleury through a plot. On their instruction, the Queen called on the King to come to her chambers, where the Duke de Bourbon was present. The doors were locked to ensure secrecy and the Duke presented the King with a report from their ambassador in Rome which blamed Fleury for the French failure in a dispute with the Pope. Bourbon asked the King if they should write a reply, which the King refused without the presence of Fleury. Meanwhile, Cardinal Fleury learned of the plot to discredit him and left the palace. The Duke and de Prie planned to use the absence of Fleury to have him confined to an abbey, and gave Marie the task of informing Louis XV that the absent Fleury wished to enter an Abbey and leave his position at court. This led to a crisis when the King gave Bourbon the choice to either expel Madame de Prie and Paris de Verney or be removed from his post of prime minister. This incident led to Cardinal Fleury categorizing Queen Marie as his opponent, and his decision to oust the ministry of the Duke of Bourbon. Cardinal Fleury warned the King that no woman should be allowed to participate in state affairs and that listening to women's advice would lead to disaster.

In June 1726, Fleury convinced the King to deprive the Duke of Bourbon of his ministry. Madame de Prie immediately enlisted the Queen to speak to the King in favor of Bourbon. She protested but agreed and reportedly spoke passionately about the affair to the King, but she was unable to succeed as the King reacted very negatively to her attempt to interfere in politics after the preparation from Fleury that women should not be allowed to participate in state affairs. The day following the fall of the Duke de Bourbon's ministry, Louis XV stated to Queen Marie that he demanded of her to let herself be directed by Cardinal Fleury in the future with the words:

"I beg, Madame, and, if necessary, I order you to place credence in everything that the former Archbishop of Frejus tells you on my behalf, as though he were I – Louis".

Marie's attempt to participate in state affairs during the events of 1726 resulted in a crisis in her relationship with Louis XV, and she sought advice on how to behave from the Princess of Carignano, who, unbeknownst to her, was a spy in service of Savoy. The princess' advice was that as Queen of France, it was Marie's duty not to become involved in political intrigues and plots, but to act as an example of virtue and piety; a role model of a "Catholic consort of the Most Christian King". Queen Marie accepted the advice and followed it for the rest of her life, as she was never again involved in any political activity. After the 1726 crisis and until the birth of a dauphin in 1729, Cardinal Fleury and the Princess of Carignano made long running preparations to replace Marie if she should die in childbirth, preferably with Charlotte of Hesse-Rheinfels-Rotenburg.

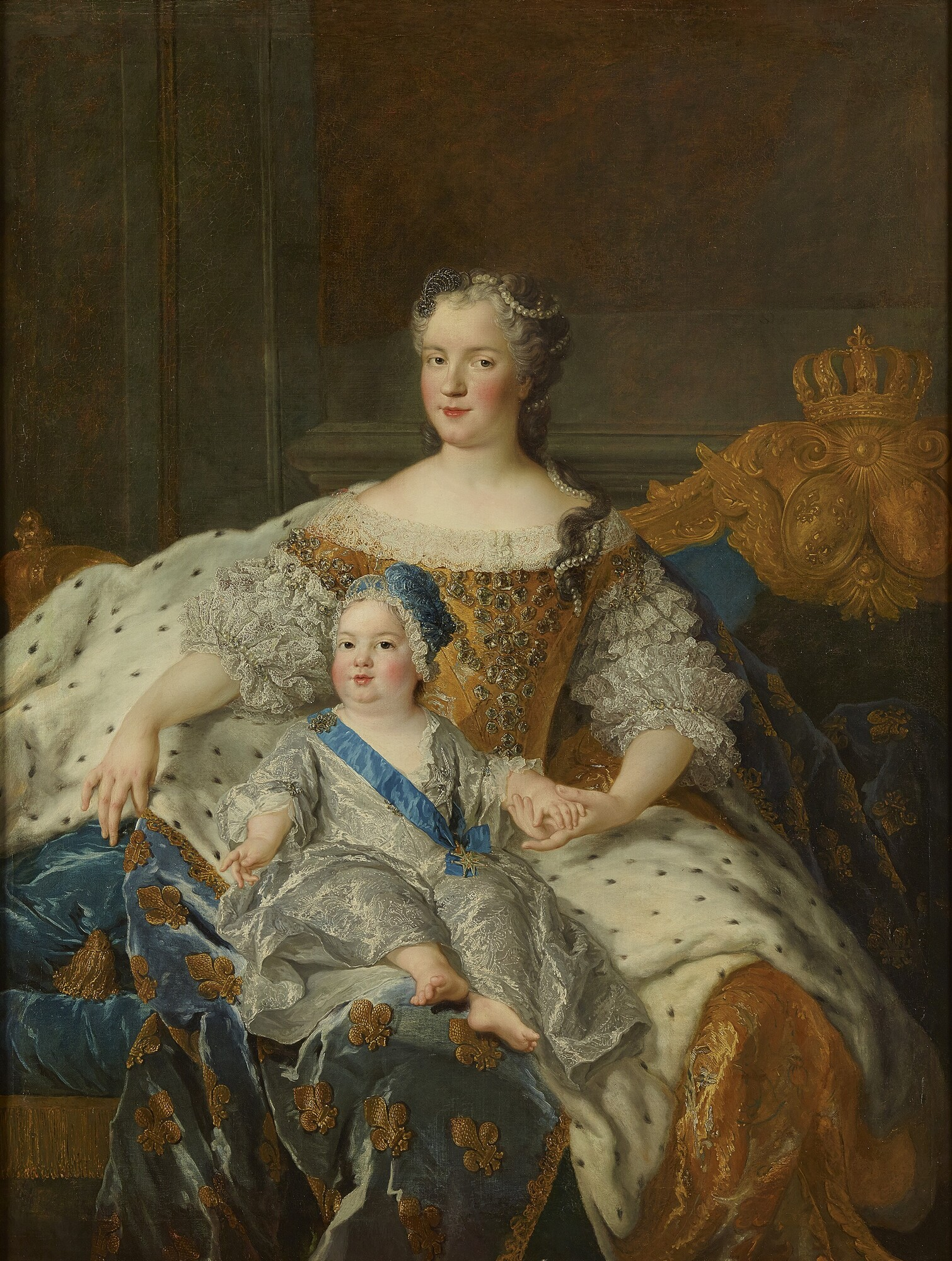
Queen Marie with her son Louis, Dauphin of France (portrait by Alexis Simon Belle, ca. 1730)

Marie reconciled with Cardinal Fleury, whom she kept contact with through letters and humbly entrusted to advise her how to behave in order to please the King. Fleury and Marie developed a cordial relationship and he often granted her his support when he estimated that her request to the King was harmless; such as in 1742, when the Cardinal, on her request, persuaded the King to allow her to appoint her personal friend Amable-Gabrielle de Villars as Dame d'atours. Her political activity after 1726 was limited to asking Louis XV to grant a pension or a promotion to a friend, and she often used Cardinal Fleury as a mediator to achieve this.

Despite her lack of influence, she did have political views, and also some indirect political importance. During the War of the Polish Succession in 1733–1736, she supported her father's candidacy to the Polish throne, and upon her father's demand, she did her best to encourage Cardinal Fleury to support her father's candidacy, but she expressed to the Cardinal that she had never wished for the war and that she was an innocent cause of it because the French wished to enhance her dynastic status. After the war, her father was given the Duchy of Lorraine because he was the father-in-law of the King of France, and the Duchy became part of France after the death of her father who became Duke of Lorraine, thus making herself indirectly useful in the political arena. As a devout Catholic, Queen Marie gave her passive support to the so-called Dévots party at court, supported the bishops in their conflicts with the Parlement of Paris, and expressed sympathy for the Jesuit order in their conflict with the crown. It was also a fact, that if the King should die before his son was an adult, then she would in accordance with custom have become regent of France until his 13th birthday, which made Marie a potential regent from the birth of the dauphin until his 13th-birthday, a fact which would have been well known at court.

=== Role as queen ===
Queen Marie was initially not respected by the royal court, where she was regarded as low-born. Her lack of dynastic status and lack of connections left her without a political power base, and she did not manage to acquire any personal or political influence. She was not credited with any personal significance and not given much personal attention outside of her ceremonial role as queen.

As queen, Marie Leszczyńska performed her ceremonial role in strict accordance with formal court etiquette and regularly and punctually fulfilled all the numerous representational duties that the court life at Versailles demanded of her. She valued the ritualized pomp and court presentations in order to increase her dignity and win the respect of the court nobility, which was necessary because she had no prestigious dynastic connections of birth and was thus initially seen as low born by them: her successor as queen, Marie Antoinette, was to ignore many of these rules, and once pointed out, that in contrast to her predecessor Queen Marie Leszczyńska, it was not necessary for her to enhance her status and dignity since her dynastic status was evident by birth, and that she could therefore afford to relax on her etiquette without losing respect.

Marie was given an allowance of 100.000 livres for pleasure, charity and gambling, a sum which was in reality often irregularly paid and also insufficient, as she was often in debt. Though she had simple habits - for example, her apartments at Versailles were not redecorated after 1737 – her favorite game, cavagnole, often placed her in debt, and the King was normally unwilling to pay these off for her.

She accepted that her courtiers were appointed because of rank rather than personal preference, and conversed politely with those who were in attendance. However, though she was careful to always fulfill her representational role, she never participated in court life outside of what was necessary to fulfill her ceremonial duties, and when they were done, she preferred to retire to her private apartments with an intimate circle of friends. Among her own private friends were her grand almoner Cardinal de Luynes, Duke Charles Philippe d'Albert de Luynes and her Dame d'honneur Marie Brûlart as well as the wealthy widow of the late Regent the Dowager Duchess of Orleans: Francoise Marie de Bourbon (legitimized daughter of Louis XIV and Madame de Montespan), who would invite and organized parties in her palaces in Paris for Marie Leszczyńska. Her other favorite lady in waiting was her Dame d'atour, Françoise de Mazarin, who supported Marie during the affair between her cousin, Louise Julie de Mailly and the King. Marie's private circle of friends was completed with the addition of President Hénault (her Surintendant since 1753) and Comte d'Argenson, whom she had asked not to address her with her title and with whom she also consulted when she wished to have a pension or a promotion given to a protégé. Like her mother, Marie maintained a political correspondence with Margareta Gyllenstierna, the spouse of Arvid Horn, after she had made her acquaintance during her stay in Sweden.

Queen Marie eventually did manage to win the respect of the court nobility by her strict adherence to court etiquette, which made her opinion at least formally important. In 1747, Voltaire was banished from the royal court through her influence. The reason were two incidents, both of which insulted the queen: During one long night of gambling, Voltaire's lover, Emilie du Chatelet, lost a fortune at the Queen's gambling table, during which Voltaire whispered to her in English that she had been cheated. This was regarded as an insult to the Queen, because it denounced her guests as cheats; Voltaire could have been arrested for his ill-timed remark. Shortly afterward, Voltaire wrote a poem in honor of his patron, the royal mistress Madame de Pompadour, in which he alluded to the sexual relationship between Pompadour and the King. This insulted Marie and led to the banishment of Voltaire from court.

When her first daughter-in-law died in 1746, the Queen, very fond and loving of her only son, opposed the selection of his next spouse, the Duchess Marie-Josèphe of Saxony, because she was the daughter of her father's rival, King Augustus III of Poland. Her dislike of the match was known but ignored, as she had no dynastic connections. Initially, this issue caused some friction between the Queen and her new daughter-in-law. However, the friction was soon overcome, reportedly because Marie-Josèphe was an admirer of the Queen's father. In honour of him, several of the Queen's grandsons received the name Stanislaus (Stanislas in French) at their christening.

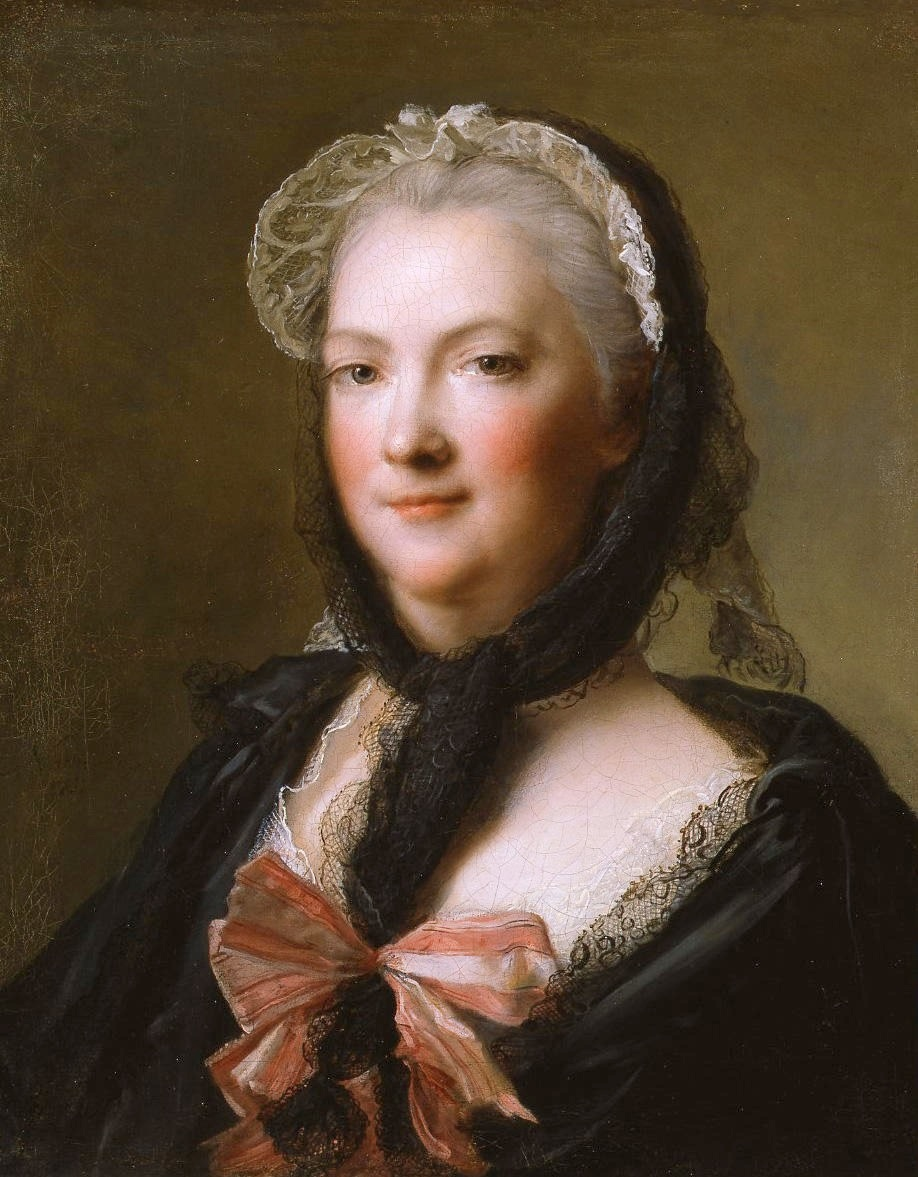
Portrait of Queen Marie Leszczyńska in 1753 (by Jean-Marc Nattier)

Queen Marie maintained the role and reputation of a simple and dignified Catholic queen. She functioned as an example of Catholic piety and was framed for her generosity to the poor through her philanthropy which included establishing workhouses, livelihood programs and financial assistance as well as supporting orphanages and hospitals, which made her very popular among the public her entire life as Queen.

==== Cultural influences at Versailles ====
Marie played a great part as a cultural and art patron. The Queen was the benefactor of the painters Charles-Antoine Coypel, from whom she commissioned 34 religious paintings in her apartments, as well as Jean-Marc Nattier, who painted the last portrait she ever sat for. The portrait, a favourite of the Queen's for its informality and naturalism, was a commercial success for Nattier. Engravings were made and many prints of it went into circulation. She was also was the promoter of many other artists such as Alexis-Simon Belle, Pierre Gobert, Jean Louis Tocqué, Carl Van Loo, Maurice Quentin de Latour, Hyacinthe Rigaud, and the poet Moncrift. The Queen herself was skilled painting, receiving painting lessons from Jean-Baptiste Oudry, and was noted for painting skilled reproductions of his work. She also excelled in embroidery and needlework, and gave her work pieces to poor churches.

Marie was a great lover of music, and was skilled at the hurdy gurdy, harpsichord, and guitar. In 1737, the Queen invited the castrato Farinelli to Versailles, whom she received singing lessons from. Marie also met a young Mozart, who made an appearance at Versailles in 1764, whom she found very charming. During his visit to the palace, Marie acted as an interpreter for the King and his family, who did not understand German. Contemporaries of the Queen noted that Marie was fluent in seven languages such as Italian, German, French, Latin, Swedish, and English aside from her native Polish and was very useful when receiving foreign ambassadors. A major contribution to cultural enrichment at Versailles was the weekly Polish choral concerts.

The Queen was also noted for having an influence on the interior design of Versailles. The Duke de Luynes credits Marie for having originally introduced Sèvres porcelain flowers to courtiers by displaying them in her apartments. She is also known for popularising the bed à la Polonaise at Versailles. In the culinary realm, Marie made eating lentils popular in France and was also noted for inventing along with her chefs the now famous French meat pastry called "bouchée à la reine" in 1735.

== Death and burial ==
Marie Leszczyńska died on 24 June 1768, one day after her birthday, at the age of 65. She had enjoyed great popularity among the public in her early and later years. She was buried at the Basilica of St Denis, and her heart was entombed at the Church of Notre-Dame-de-Bonsecours in Nancy.

== Children ==
Children of Marie Leszczyńska

Name	Portrait	Lifespan	Notes
Marie Louise Élisabeth; Duchess of Parma		14 August 1727 – 6 December 1759	Married Philip, Duke of Parma. Had issue. Died at age 32.
Anne Henriette Madame		14 August 1727 – 10 February 1752	Died at age 24 without marrying; no issue.
Marie Louise		28 July 1728 – 19 February 1733	Died in childhood; no issue.
Louis Ferdinand, Dauphin of France		4 September 1729 – 20 December 1765	Married María Teresa Rafaela of Spain; had issue. Upon the death of María Teresa, however, he married Maria Josepha of Saxony; had issue including future Louis XVI, Louis XVIII and Charles X
Philippe Louis, Duke of Anjou		30 August 1730 – 7 April 1733	Died in childhood; no issue.
Marie Adélaïde Duchess of Louvois		23 March 1732 – 27 February 1800	Died at age 67 without marrying; no issue.
Marie Louise Thérèse Victoire		11 May 1733 – 7 June 1799	Died at age 66 without marrying; no issue.
Sophie Philippine Élisabeth Justine; Fille de France Duchess of Louvois	Jean-Marc Nattier, Madame Sophie de France (1748) - 01	27 July 1734 – 2 March 1782	Died at age 47 without marrying; no issue.
Marie Thérèse Félicité		16 May 1736 – 28 September 1744	Died in childhood; no issue.
Louise-Marie	Sister Thérèse of Saint Augustine, formerly princess Louise Marie of France	15 July 1737 – 23 December 1787	Died at age 50 without marrying; no issue.

== Ancestry ==
Ancestors of Marie Leszczyńska

16. Rafał Leszczyński
8. Bogusław Leszczyński
17. Anna Radzimińska
4. Rafał Leszczyński
18. Kaspar von Dönhoff
9. Joanna Katarzyna von Dönhoff
19. Anna Aleksandra Koniecpolska
2. Stanisław Leszczyński, King of Poland
20. Jan Jabłonowski
10. Stanisław Jan Jabłonowski
21. Anna Ostroróg
5. Anna Jabłonowska
22. Dominik Aleksander Kazanowski
11. Marianna Kazanowska
23. Anna Potocka
1. Marie Leszczyńska −
24. Piotr Opaliński
12. Krzysztof Opaliński
25. Zofia Kostka
6. Jan Karol Opaliński
26. Adam Sędziwój Czarnkowski
13. Teresa Konstancja Czarnkowska
27. Katarzyna Leszczyńska
3. Katarzyna Opalinska
28. Kazimierz Franciszek Czarnkowski
14. Adam Uriel Czarnkowski
29. Konstancja Lubomirska
7. Zofia Czarnkowska Opalińska
30. Remigian Zaleski
15. Teresa Zaleska
31. Anna Miełżyńska

== Notes ==
Marie Leszczyńska House of Leszczyński Born: 23 June 1703 Died: 24 June 1768
French royalty
Vacant Title last held by Maria Theresa of Spain	Queen consort of France; 4 September 1725 – 24 June 1768	Vacant Title next held by Marie Antoinette
