= Henriette of France =

French princess (1727–1752)

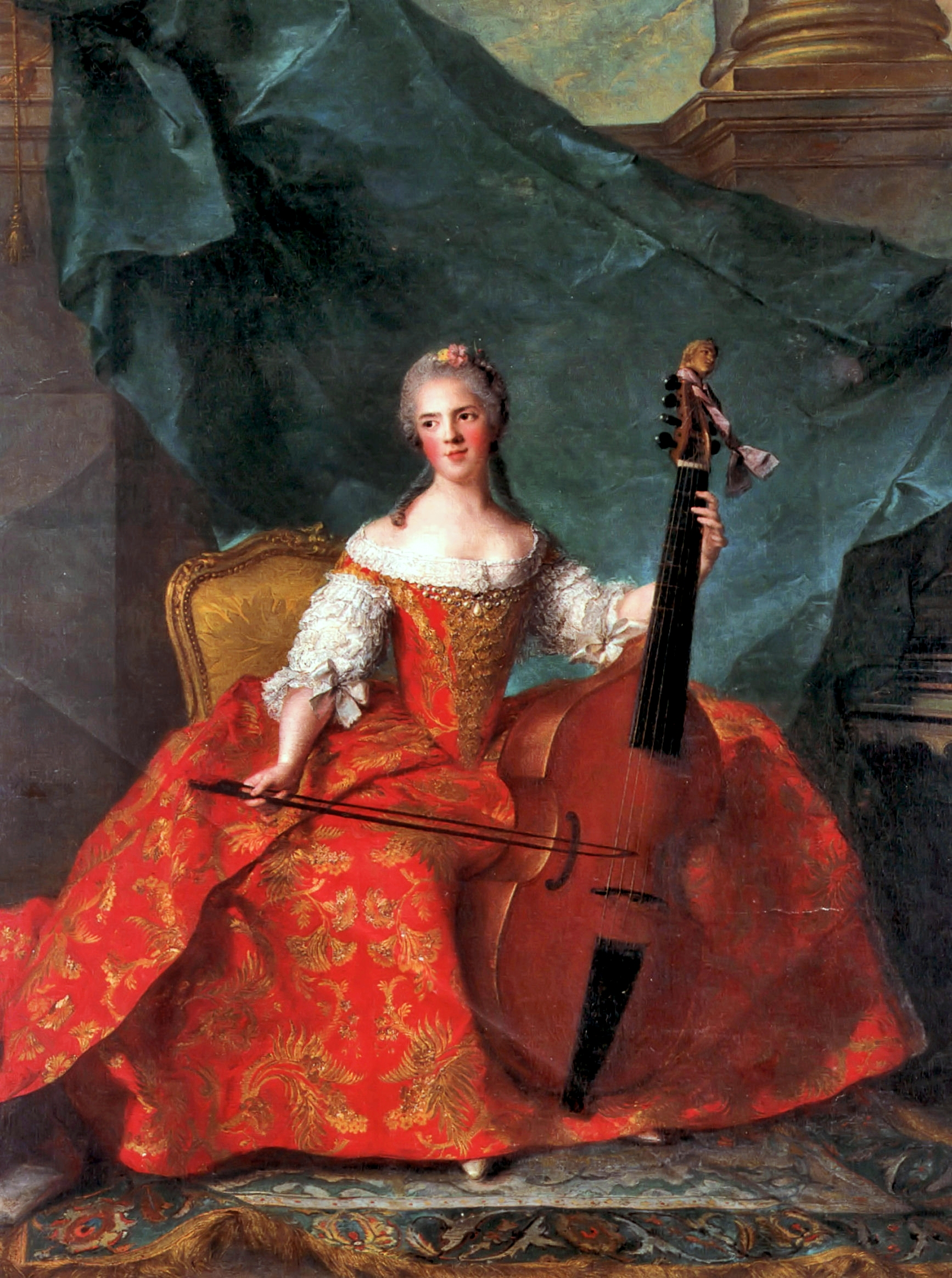
- Portrait by Jean Marc Nattier, 1754
- Born: 14 August 1727; Palace of Versailles, Versailles, Kingdom of France
- Died: 10 February 1752 (aged 24); Palace of Versailles, Versailles, Kingdom of France
- Burial: Basilica of Saint-Denis, France
Names
- Anne Henriette of France
- House: Bourbon
- Father: Louis XV
- Mother: Marie Leszczyńska

- Coat of arms of a princess of France

Henriette of France (Anne Henriette; 14 August 1727 – 10 February 1752) was a French princess, a fille de France. She was the second child of King Louis XV and Queen Marie Leszczyńska, and the twin of Louise-Élisabeth of France. She was also considered the favorite daughter of the royal couple and was known for her sweet and gentle personality.

== Life ==
=== Early life ===
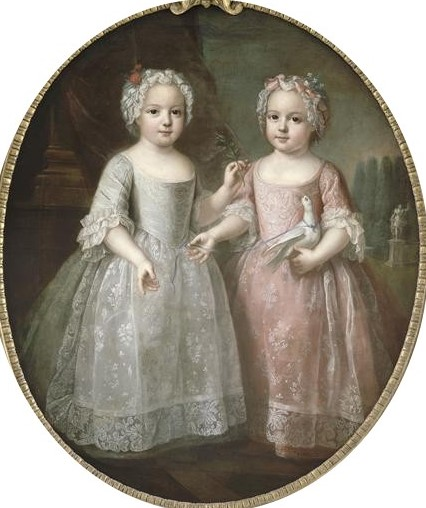
Louise Élisabeth and Henriette (right), Pierre Gobert, 1737

Anne Henriette and her older twin sister Princess Louise Élisabeth were born at the Palace of Versailles on 14 August 1727, to Louis XV and Queen Maria Leszczyńska. While the birth of the twins was considered a political disappointment as Salic law disqualified them as heirs to the throne, their father the King was delighted, and commented that after talk of him not being able to be a father, he was now the father of two. Barbier noted in his journals that during the pregnancy Louis XV was very kind and affectionate to Marie Leszczyńska this time and stopped hunting for a while so as to accompany her which gave the queen great joy.

Along with her twin, she was baptised at Versailles in 1727. Henriette was named after her paternal great-great grandmother Henrietta, Duchess of Orléans, with Louis Henri, Duke of Bourbon, and Louise Anne de Bourbon as her godparents. As the legitimate daughter of the King, she was a fille de France, but as the younger of the twins, she was referred as Madame Seconde; as an adult, she became known as Madame Henriette, or only Madame, as the eldest daughter of the King present in Versailles after the marriage of her sister.

The eldest children of Louis XV, the twins Élisabeth and Henriette, Marie-Louise, Adélaïde and their brother the Dauphin of France, were raised in Versailles under the supervision of the Governess of the Children of France, Marie Isabelle de Rohan, duchesse de Tallard, while their younger siblings, Victoire, Sophie, Thérèse, and Louise, were sent to be raised at Fontevraud Abbey in June 1738.

In 1739, Élisabeth left France to marry the Infante Philip, a younger son of King Philip V of Spain. Henriette was reportedly despondent about being separated from her twin.

=== Adult life ===
Royal French children were allowed to participate in court life as well as arrange their own festivities even in childhood; those kept at court participated in court life from the age of twelve. From 1744 onward, Henriette and Adélaïde accompanied their father to the Paris Opera, and from 1746, they hunted with him five days a week. In 1744, Henriette and Adelaide were officially transferred from the royal nursery and the King created their own household, the Household of the Mesdames aînées ('Elder Mesdames') and appointed two ladies-in-waiting (dame pour accompagner Mesdames); two years later, they were given their own dame d'honneur.

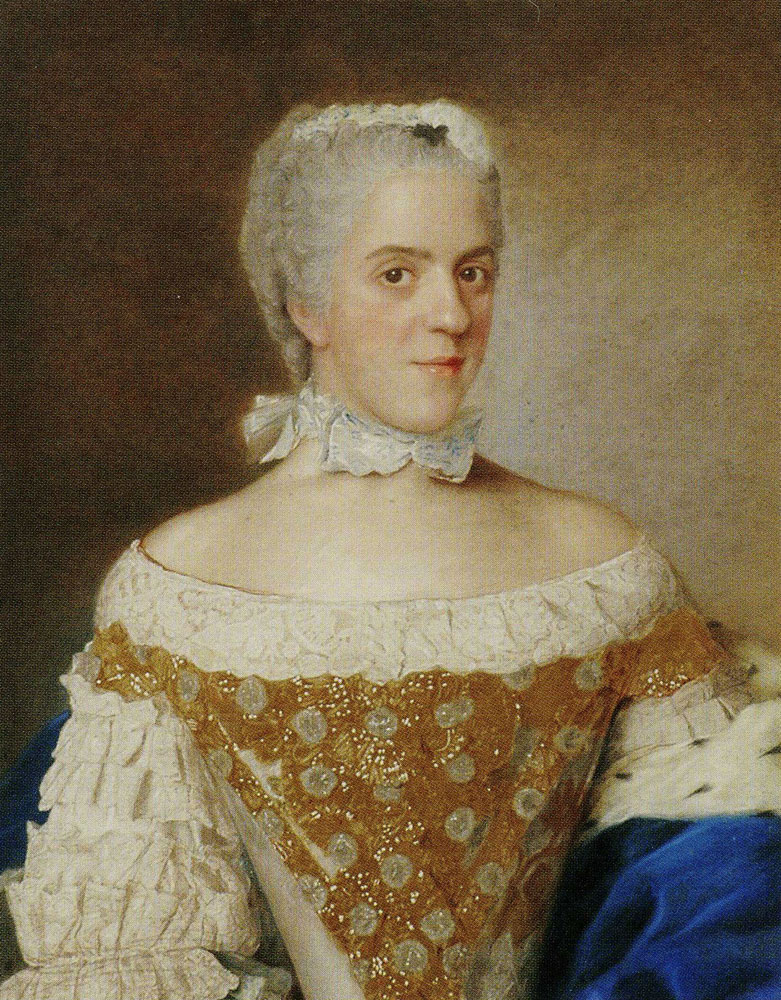
Portrait by Jean-Étienne Liotard, 1749

Henriette was considered to be prettier than her elder twin. She was described as gentle and melancholic, reserved but intensely loyal, and gifted in music. She was evidently the favorite child of her father, and it was said that she had no enemies at court. The Duke of Luynes commented several times in his memoirs that her mother Queen Marie Leszczyńska was also close to her, and that she frequently consoled her daughter whenever she was ill and when her visiting married twin sister Elisabeth had to depart again for Parma in 1749.

Despite her beauty, no serious marriage negotiations were ever made for Henriette. In 1740, Louis François, Prince of Conti, suggested a marriage between himself and Henriette to her father when he was alone with the King during a hunt. He explained that he believed he could make Henriette happy, and that such a marriage would mean she would never have to leave her father and France. The King, however, did not react favorably to the proposal.

Henriette reportedly fell mutually in love with her cousin, Louis Philippe, heir to the House of Orléans, and wished to marry him. The King initially approved, but changed his mind, not wanting the House of Orléans too close to the throne. The plans were discontinued in 1743, when the Duke married someone else.

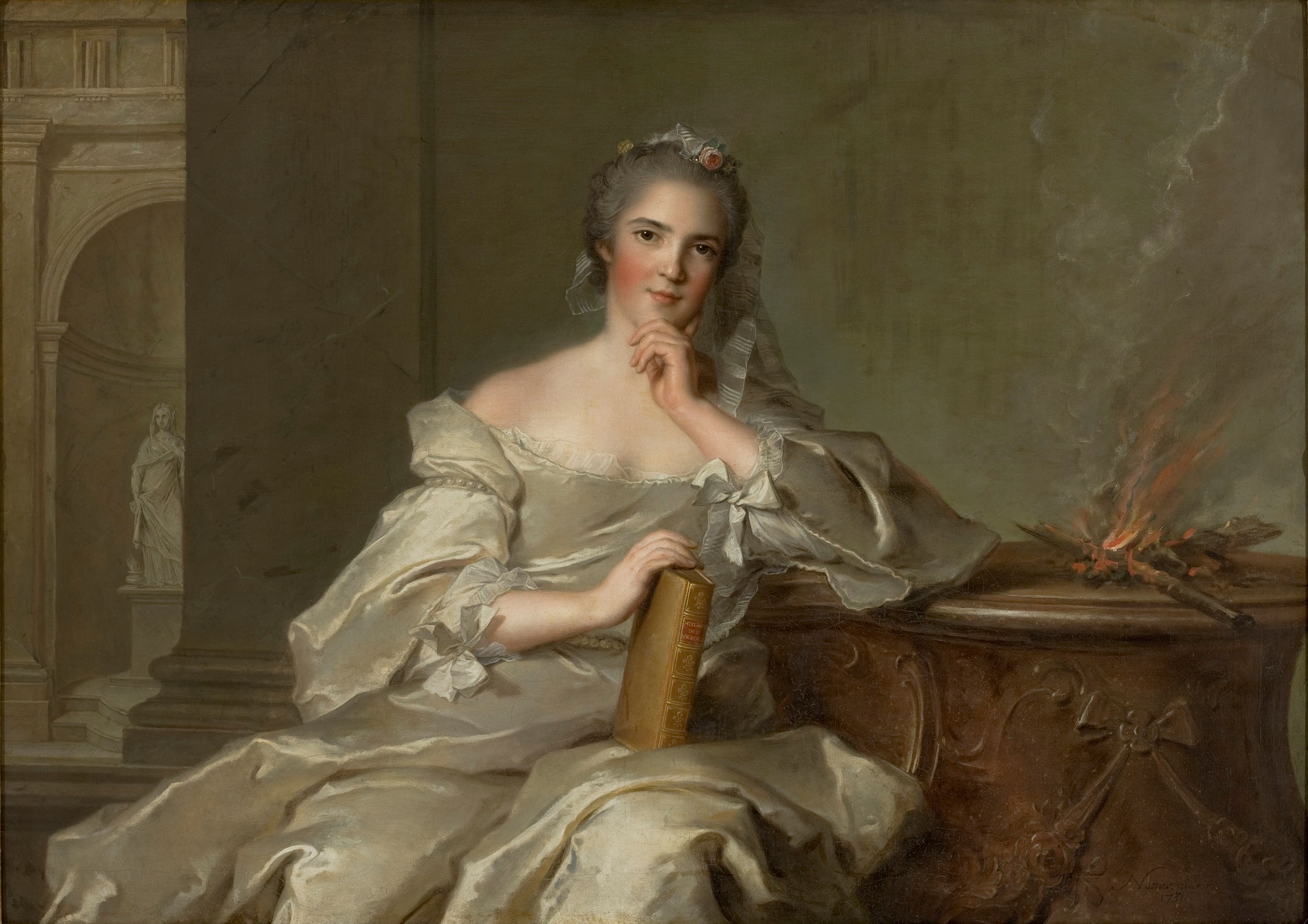
Madame Henriette as Fire by Jean-Marc Nattier, 1751

Her twin Élisabeth, who was described as ambitious, was not satisfied as the spouse of a prince without a throne. She kept in contact with the French court, and by 1740 had established a network of contacts there to assist her in her ambitions. Henriette was one of her most fervent champions in this issue; the powerful Noailles and Maurepas allied with the Queen to achieve the same, and the French ambassador at Madrid, Monseigneur Vauréal, bishop of Rennes. Otherwise regarded as habitually apathetic about politics, Henriette was reportedly passionately devoted to working for the political ambitions of her twin, as was her younger sister Adélaïde and her sister-in-law Infanta Maria Teresa.

Henriette, as well as her siblings, was deeply hurt by their father's extramarital liaisons, as they caused their father to neglect their beloved mother. Their discontent with their father's adultery was directed toward his mistresses, most notably Madame de Mailly who was their father's mistress during their childhood, and then Madame de Pompadour in their adult years, who from 1745 onward was the influential maîtresse-en-titre. With her brother, the Dauphin Louis, and her sister, Madame Adélaïde, she called the powerful mistress Maman Putain ("Mother Whore"). When Louise Élisabeth returned from Parma for a year-long visit to Versailles in 1748, she and Madame de Pompadour became close friends, which led to a temporary estrangement between the sisters.

In 1747, her brother Louis was forced to marry Maria Josepha of Saxony, shortly after the death of his beloved first spouse, Maria Teresa Rafaela, in childbirth. Louis was initially hostile toward his new wife, even more so when his only child with the Spanish Infanta died, but she eventually managed to win his affection with the help of advice from Henriette.

=== Death ===
Henriette died of smallpox in 1752 at the age of twenty-four. In February of that year, she had felt somewhat unwell and tired, but when the King asked her to accompany him on a sledge ride, she gave no signs of her discomfort, and accepted the invitation anyway. She was badly affected by the chilly weather, and died after just three days of illness. The Duke of Luynes commented that her mother Marie Leszczyńska nursed her during her fatal illness. Her family was described as being in a "state of stupefaction over the rapidity of the illness." Meanwhile her mother Marie Leszczyńska was inconsolable.

Louis XV reacted with "violent" despair upon her death and gave orders for the highest honors around her funeral; in order to enhance public mourning, her remains were placed at the Tuileries Palace instead of Versailles prior to the funeral, dressed in one of her finest dresses and made up so to appear alive. But the public funeral reception was not to the King's taste, as the people "drank, laughed and amused themselves", which was taken as a sign of the diminishing reputation of the monarchy, as the public interpreted the death of Henriette to be a sign of divine disapproval of the King's lifestyle.

Her heart was interred in the Abbey of Val-de-Grâce, while her remains were buried at the Basilica of Saint-Denis, along with her sister Élisabeth. Her tomb, like other royal tombs at Saint-Denis, was destroyed during the French Revolution.

Madame Campan later wrote: "Madame Henriette, twin sister of the Duchess of Parma, was much regretted, for she had considerable influence over the King’s mind, and it was remarked that if she had lived she would have been assiduous in finding him amusements in the bosom of his family, would have followed him in his short excursions, and would have done the honours of the 'petits soupers' which he was so fond of giving in his private apartments."

== In popular culture ==
In the silent film Monsieur Beaucaire (1924), Henriette is a prominent character played by Bebe Daniels.

== Ancestry ==
Ancestors of Henriette of France

8. Louis, Dauphin of France
4. Louis, Duke of Burgundy
9. Maria Anna Victoria of Bavaria
2. Louis XV of France
10. Victor Amadeus II of Sardinia
5. Marie Adélaïde of Savoy
11. Anne Marie of Orléans
1. Henriette of France
12. Rafał Leszczyński
6. Stanisław I Leszczyński
13. Anna Jabłonowska
3. Marie Leszczyńska
14. Jan Karol Opaliński
7. Katarzyna Opalińska
15. Zofia Czarnkowska
