= Louis, Duke of Brittany =

Louis, Duke of Brittany, or variations on this name, may refer to:

- Louis XII of France (1462-1515), who by marriage to Duchess Anne of Brittany, was Duke of Brittany
- Louis, Duke of Brittany (born 1704), died in 1705, eldest son of Louis, Duke of Burgundy (Dauphin of France) and Princess Marie Adélaïde of Savoy
- Louis, Duke of Brittany (born 1707), died in 1712, second son of Louis, Duke of Burgundy and Princess Marie Adélaïde of Savoy, briefly succeeded his father as Dauphin
