= Louis of France =

Louis of France or Louis de France may refer to:

- Kings of the Franks, of West Francia and of France:
  - Louis the Pious (778–840), son of Charlemagne, counted as Louis I
  - Louis the Stammerer (846–879), son of Charles the Bald, counted as Louis II
  - Louis III of France (863/865–882)
  - Louis IV of France (920/921–954), called Louis d'Outremer
  - Louis V of France (c.966/967–987), called Louis the Do-Nothing
  - Louis VI of France (1081–1137), called Louis the Fat
  - Louis VII of France (1120–1180), called Louis the Younger
  - Louis VIII of France (1187–1226), called Louis the Lion
  - Louis IX of France (1214–1270), canonized by the Catholic Church as Saint Louis
  - Louis X of France (1289–1316), called Louis the Quarreller
  - Louis XI (1423–1483), called Louis the Prudent and the Spider King
  - Louis XII (1462–1515), died without an heir
  - Louis XIII (1601–1643), called Louis the Just
  - Louis XIV (1638–1715), called the Sun King and Louis the Great
  - Louis XV (1710–1774), called Louis the Beloved
  - Louis XVI (1754–1793), executed in the French Revolution
  - Louis XVII (1785–1795), died in prison, never anointed as king
  - Louis XVIII (1755–1824), called Louis the Desired
  - Louis-Antoine, Duke of Angoulême (1775–1844), son of Charles X of France, sometimes regarded as Louis XIX, nominally king for less than an hour
- People other than kings:
  - Louis of France (1244–1260), oldest son of Louis IX of France
  - Louis of France (1263–1276), oldest son of Philip III of France
  - Louis d'Évreux (1276–1319), Count of Évreux, sixth son of Philip III of France
  - Louis of France (1324–1324), second son of Charles IV of France
  - Louis of France (1329–1329), second son of Philip VI of France
  - Louis of France (1330–1330), third son of Philip VI of France
  - Louis I of Naples (1339–1384), second son of John II of France
  - Louis I, Duke of Orléans (1372-1407), second son of Charles V of France
  - Louis, Duke of Guyenne and Dauphin of France (1397-1415), third son of Charles VI of France
  - Louis of France (1458–1460), oldest son of Louis XI
  - Louis of France (1549–1550), Duke of Orléans, second son of Henry II of France
  - Louis, Grand Dauphin (1661–1711), eldest son of Louis XIV of France
  - Louis François of France (1672–1672), duke of Anjou, third son of Louis XIV of France
  - Louis, Duke of Burgundy and Dauphin of France (1682–1712), grandson of Louis XIV of France
  - Louis, Duke of Brittany, (1704-1705) great-grandson of Louis XIV
  - Louis, Duke of Brittany, Dauphin of France (1707-1712), great-grandson of Louis XIV of France
  - Louis, Dauphin of France (1729-1765), son of Louis XV of France
  - Louis, Duke of Burgundy (1751–1761), grandson of Louis XV
  - Louis-Joseph, Dauphin of France (1781–1789), elder son of Louis XVI of France
  - Louis Alphonse de Bourbon, Duke of Anjou (born 1974), current pretender as Louis XX
- Clovises, a common Frankish name among the Kings of the French, an etymon of the name "Louis", called *Hlōdowik or *Hlōdowig, in Frankish.
  - Clovis I, founder of the Merovingian dynasty, first King of the French
  - Clovis II, King of the Franks in Neustria and Burgundy, son of Dagobert I
  - Clovis III, disputed King of the Franks
  - Clovis IV, son of Theuderic III
  - Clovis, son of Chilperic I and Audovera, assassinated by his father and stepmother

== See also ==
- Clovis (given name) § Frankish royalty, several earlier Frankish royals with a cognate name
- Louis Philippe (disambiguation) § French House of Orléans
