= Louis, Dauphin of France =

Louis, Dauphin of France (or of Viennois), or variations on this name, may refer to:

- Louis, Duke of Guyenne (1397–1415), third son of Charles VI of France, was Dauphin 1401–1415
- Louis, Grand Dauphin (1661–1711), son of Louis XIV of France, was Dauphin 1661–1711
- Louis, Duke of Burgundy (1682–1712), son of the previous, grandson of Louis XIV, known as Duke of Burgundy, was Dauphin 1711–1712
- Louis, Duke of Brittany (1707–1712), son of the previous, great-grandson of Louis XIV, known as Duke of Brittany, was Dauphin for one week in 1712
- Louis, Dauphin of France (1729–1765), also known as Louis Ferdindand, son of Louis XV of France, was Dauphin 1729–1765
- Louis Joseph, Dauphin of France (1781–1789), eldest son of Louis XVI of France and Marie Antoinette, was Dauphin 1781–1789

Several later Dauphins are considered pretenders to the throne of France:

- Louis XVII (1785–1795), originally known as Louis Charles, younger son of Louis XVI of France and Marie Antoinette, who, though never having reigned is counted as King Louis XVII, was Dauphin 1789–1791
- Louis Antoine, Duke of Angoulême (1775–1844), best known as Duke of Angoulême, son of Charles X of France, who is counted as King Louis XIX by Legitimists, was Dauphin 1824–1830
- Louis Alphonse de Bourbon, Duke of Anjou (born 1974), the current Legitimist Pretender to the defunct French throne as Louis XX, was known by his supporters as Louis, Dauphin of France from 1984 to 1989

A number of men named Louis who ascended the French throne and are much better known as kings:

- Louis XI (1423–1483) was Dauphin 1429–1461
- Louis XIII (1601–1643) was Dauphin 1601–1610
- Louis XIV (1638–1715) was Dauphin 1638–1643
- Louis XV (1710–1774) was Dauphin 1712–1715
- Louis XVI (1754–1793) was Dauphin 1765–1774

In fiction:

- Louis the Dauphin (referred to in some editions as Lewis the Dolphin, a literal English translation), a character in William Shakespeare's play King John, written in the 1590s. He is based on the historical king Louis VIII of France, who died in 1226. The title Dauphin of France is an anachronism, as it was not historically created until 1350.

== See also ==
- Louis, Dauphin of Auvergne (disambiguation)
