= Louis, Dauphin of Auvergne =

Louis, Dauphin of Auvergne may refer to:

- Louis I, Count of Montpensier, Dauphin of Auvergne
- Louis II, Count of Montpensier, Dauphin of Auvergne, grandson of the previous

== See also ==
- Louis, Dauphin of France (disambiguation)
