= Louis, Duke of Brittany (born 1704) =

French royal (1704–1705)

Louis
- Duke of Brittany
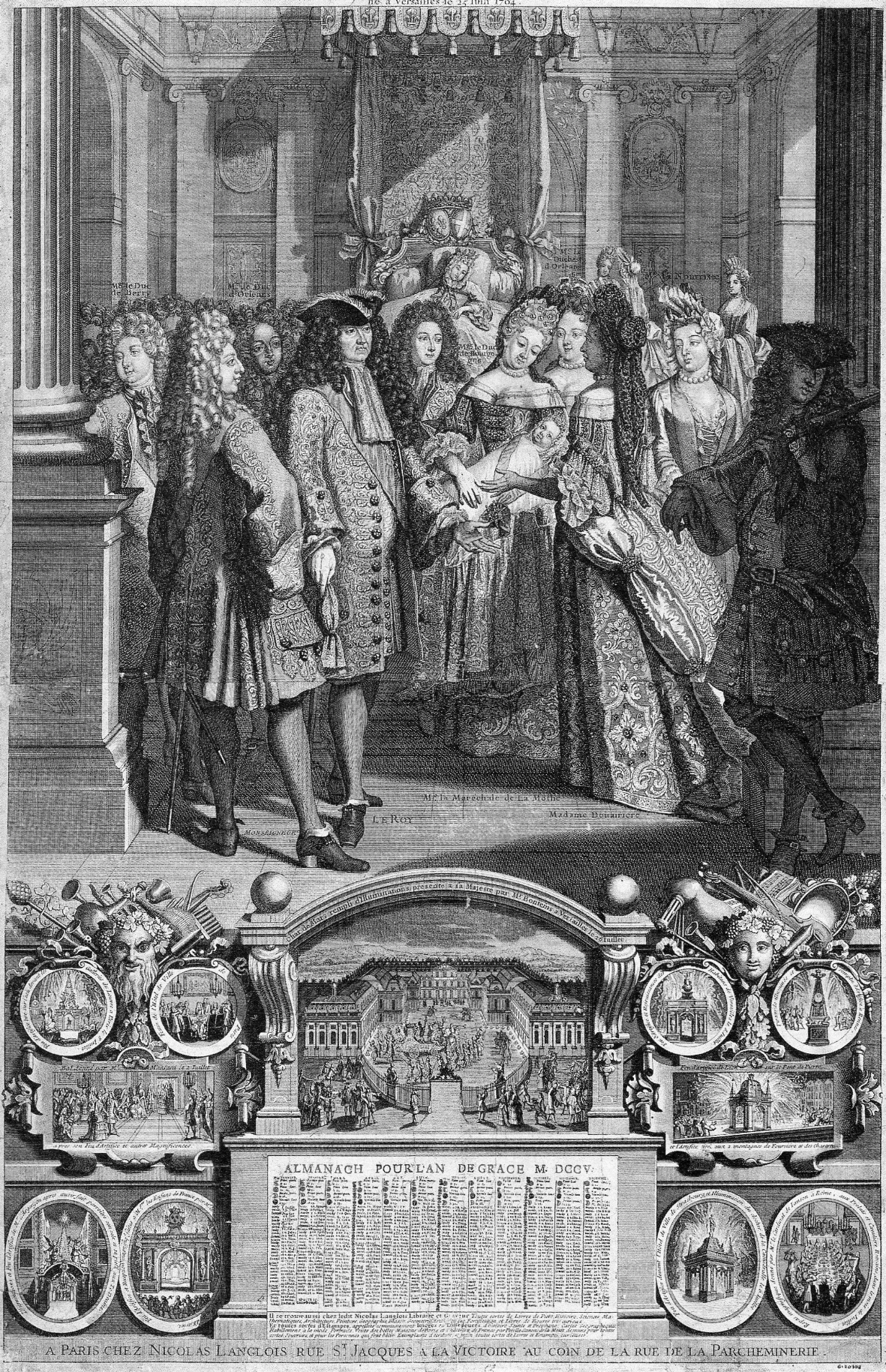
- Born: 25 June 1704; Palace of Versailles, France
- Died: 13 April 1705 (aged 0); Palace of Versailles, France
- House: Bourbon
- Father: Louis, Duke of Burgundy
- Mother: Marie Adélaïde of Savoy

Louis, Duke of Brittany (25 June 1704 – 13 April 1705) was the eldest son of Louis, Duke of Burgundy and Princess Marie Adélaïde of Savoy, grandson of Louis, Grand Dauphin, and great-grandson of Louis XIV. For his entire life, Louis was third in line of succession to the throne behind his father and grandfather. As the grandson of the Dauphin, he was a petit-fils de France. He was styled Duke of Brittany, the first to hold the title since Henry II, nearly 200 years prior. He was placed in the care of the royal governess Louise de Prie.

Louis had two younger brothers: Louis (1707–1712) and Louis (1710–1774), the latter of whom became king Louis XV in 1715.

== Death ==
On 13 April 1705, Louis died of convulsions at the age of nine and a half months,. Had he lived, he would have succeeded his great-grandfather as King of France at age eleven.

== Ancestry ==
Ancestors of Louis of France

8. Louis XIV of France
4. Louis, Dauphin of France
9. Maria Theresa of Austria
2. Louis, Duke of Burgundy
10. Ferdinand Maria, Elector of Bavaria
5. Maria Anna Victoria of Bavaria
11. Henriette Adelaide of Savoy
1. Louis of France
12. Charles Emmanuel II, Duke of Savoy
6. Victor Amadeus II of Sardinia
13. Marie Jeanne Baptiste of Savoy
3. Marie Adélaïde of Savoy
14. Philippe I, Duke of Orléans
7. Anne Marie of Orléans
15. Henrietta of England

== See also ==
- Louis, Duke of Brittany (born 1707)
