= Fils de France =

Title given to male offsprings of the King of France

Heraldic coronet of a fils de France

Fils de France (French pronunciation: [fis də fʁɑ̃s], Son of France) was the style and rank held by the sons of the kings and dauphins of France. A daughter was known as a fille de France (French pronunciation: [fij də fʁɑ̃s], Daughter of France).

The children of the dauphin (a title reserved for the king's heir apparent, whether son, grandson or great-grandson of the monarch) were accorded the same style and status as if they were the king's children instead of his grandchildren or great-grandchildren.

== Styles ==
The king, queen, queen dowager, enfants de France (children of France) and petits-enfants de France (grandchildren of France) constituted the famille du roi (royal family). More remote legitimate, male-line descendants of France's kings held the designation and rank of princes du sang (princes of the blood) or, if legally recognised despite a bar sinister on the escutcheon, they were customarily deemed princes légitimés (legitimated princes).

The dauphin, the heir to the French throne, was the most senior of the fils de France and was usually addressed as Monsieur le dauphin. The king's next younger brother, also a fils de France, was known simply as Monsieur, and his wife as Madame.

Daughters were referred to by their given name prefaced with the honorific Madame, while sons were referred to by their main peerage title (usually ducal), with the exception of the dauphin. The king's eldest daughter was known as Madame Royale until she married, whereupon the next eldest fille de France succeeded to that style.

Although the children of monarchs are often referred to in English as prince or princess, those terms were used as general descriptions for royalty in France but not as titular prefixes or direct forms of address for individuals (with the exception of Monsieur le Prince for the senior prince du sang) prior to the July Monarchy (1830–1848). Collectively, the legitimate children of the kings and dauphins were known as enfants de France ("children of France"), while examples abound in reputable works of fils de France and fille de France being converted into other languages as "Prince/Princess of France" (however the same works, as cited, leave the Spanish equivalent, Infante/Infanta de España, untranslated). The illegitimate children of French kings, dauphins, and princes du sang were not entitled to any rights or styles per se, but often they were legitimised by their fathers. Even then, however, they were never elevated to the rank of fils de France, although they were sometimes accorded the lower rank and/or privileges associated with the princes du sang.

All enfants de France were entitled to the style of Royal Highness (altesse royale) from the reign of Louis XIII. However, in practice that formal honorific was less often used than the more traditionally French styles of Monsieur, Madame or Mademoiselle. The styles of the royal family varied as follows:

== Titles ==
Under the Valois monarchs, the titles borne by the sons of kings became regularized. Philip VI made his eldest son Duke of Normandy and his second son Duke of Orléans. Normandy would have become the regular title of the heirs apparent of kings, but the acquisition of Dauphiné and the request of its last count ensured that the heirs apparent would be called Dauphin instead.

John II made his eldest son Duke of Normandy, and his younger sons dukes of Anjou, Berry, and Burgundy. Anjou and Burgundy established long-lived dynasties, while the Duke of Berry lived for a long time. Orléans was reused for the younger son of Charles V, while Berry was reused for the younger son of Charles VII. By the accession of Francis I, all of the cadet branches descended from Valois kings had either succeeded to the throne or become extinct. Thus the king had a wide selection of traditional titles to choose from. Orléans was the most preferred, followed by Anjou.

The Bourbon kings followed the traditional titling, with Berry used for the third son. As lifespans extended, Burgundy was used for the eldest son of the Dauphin, and Brittany for the eldest son of the eldest son of the Dauphin. But as fortune would have it, only the title of Orléans would be transmitted hereditarily until the Revolution.

== Monsieur le Dauphin ==
This was a form of address for the dauphin. The dauphin de France (strictly speaking the dauphin de Viennois), was the title used for the heir apparent to the throne of France from 1350 to 1791 and then from 1824 to 1830.

- Louis de France (1661–1711), the only surviving legitimately born son of Louis XIV (1638–1715), was usually not addressed by this style as he was usually referred to at court as either Monseigneur (see more below) or, informally, as le Grand Dauphin.
- Louis de France, (1682–1712), son of the preceding, who became the dauphin in 1711, was informally known as le Petit Dauphin.
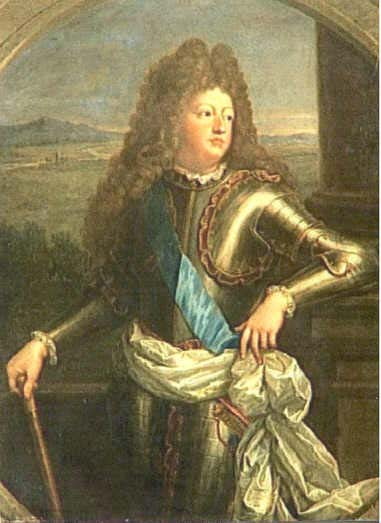
Louis de France, called le Grand Dauphin, officially known at court as Monseigneur.

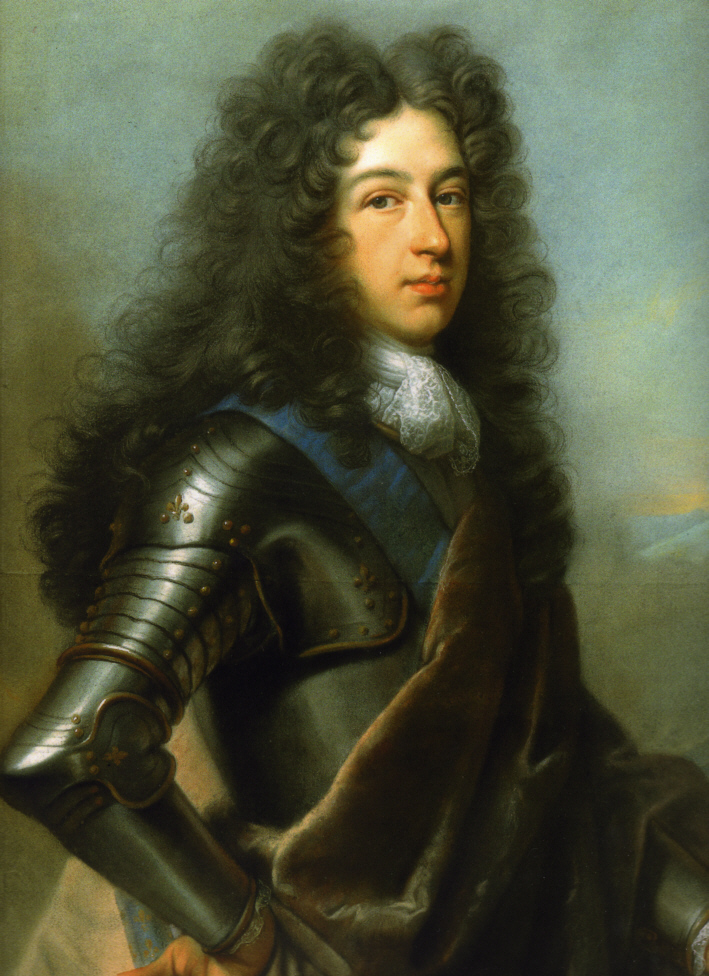
le Petit Dauphin, son of Monseigneur, le Grand Dauphin

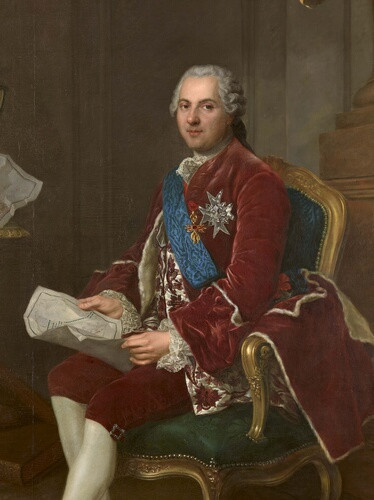
Louis of France - Dauphin of Louis XV

=== Monseigneur ===
This was another way of addressing Le Grand Dauphin, the only legitimate son of Louis XIV. After the death of le Grand Dauphin, the heir apparent to the throne of France for half a century, the style of Monseigneur was not used again to describe the dauphin himself. Rather, it became the style used by his sons as prefix to their peerages. During the lifetime of the Grand Dauphin, his three sons were addressed as:

- Monseigneur le Duc de Bourgogne
- Monseigneur le Duc d'Anjou
- Monseigneur le Duc de Berry

== Madame la Dauphine ==
This was the style of the dynastic wife of the dauphin. Some holders of the honorific were:

- Duchess Maria Anna Christine Victoria of Bavaria (1660–1690), also called Dauphine Victoire, first wife of le Grand Dauphin, and the grandmother of Louis XV (1710–1774)
- Princess Maria Adélaïde of Savoy (1685–1712), wife of the Dauphin Louis (1682–1712) and mother of Louis XV.
- Infanta Maria Teresa Antonia Rafaela of Spain (1726–1746), first wife of Louis (1729–1765), the only son of Louis XV, and held the style till her death at age twenty-one.
- Duchess Maria Josepha of Saxony (1731–1767), second wife of the Dauphin Louis, and mother of Louis XVI (1754–1793), Louis XVIII (1755–1824) and Charles X (1757–1836).
- Archduchess Maria Antonia Josepha Johanna of Austria (1755–1793), known as Marie Antoinette was the dauphine from 1770 until her husband succeeded to the throne in 1774 as Louis XVI.
- Princess Marie-Thérèse Charlotte of France (1778–1851); daughter of Louis XVI and Marie-Antoinette, known as Madame Royale, she became the last Dauphine of France when her father-in-law, Charles X, succeeded to the throne in 1824.
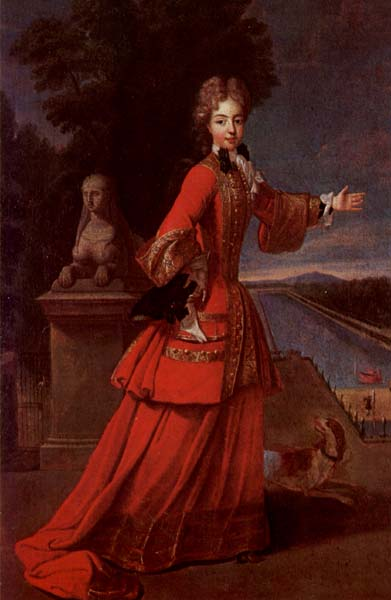
Madame la Dauphine, wife of le Petit Dauphin

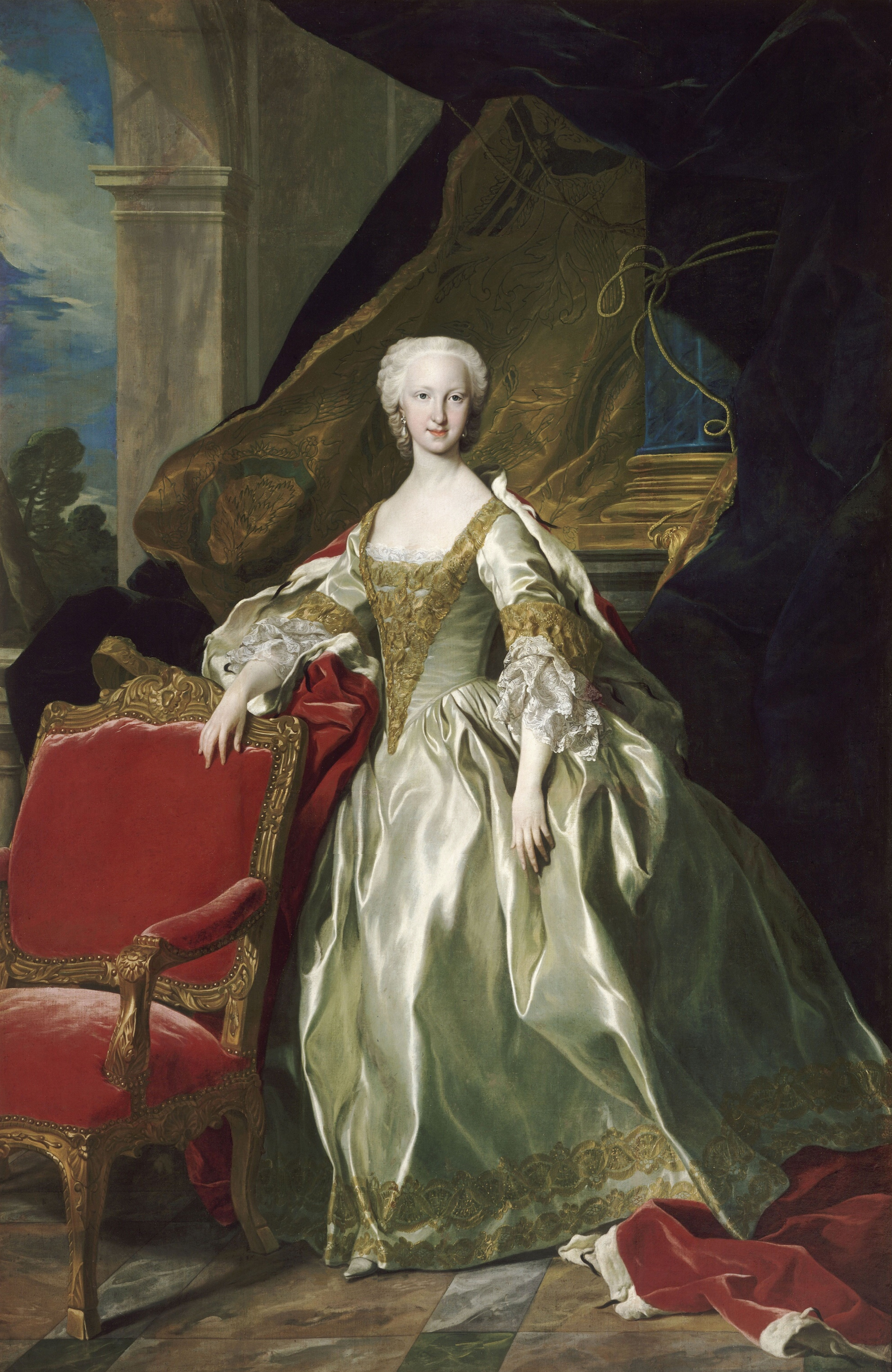
Maria Teresa Rafaela of Spain first wife of Louis de France - daughter-in-law of Louis XV

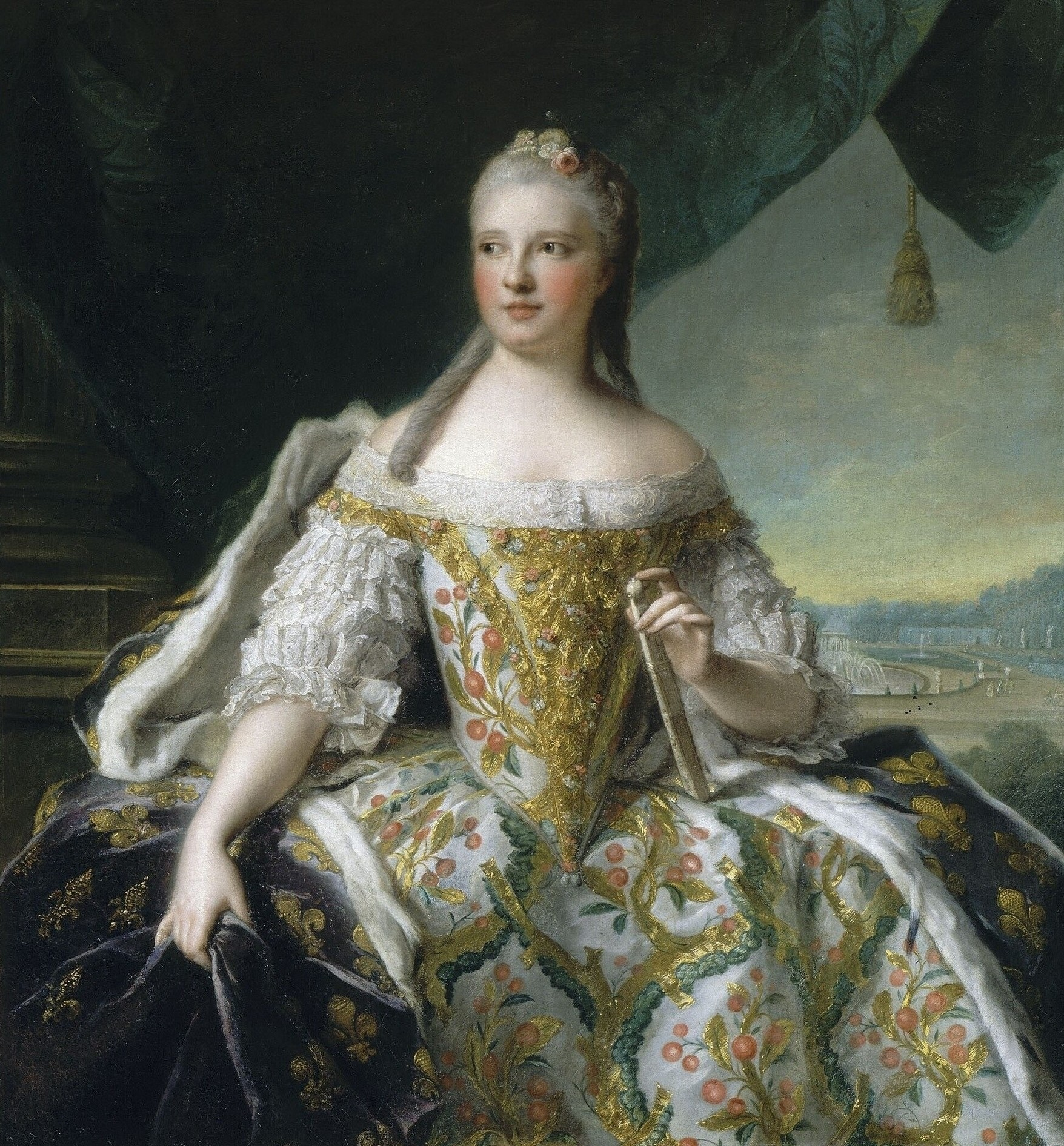
Duchess Maria Josepha of Saxony

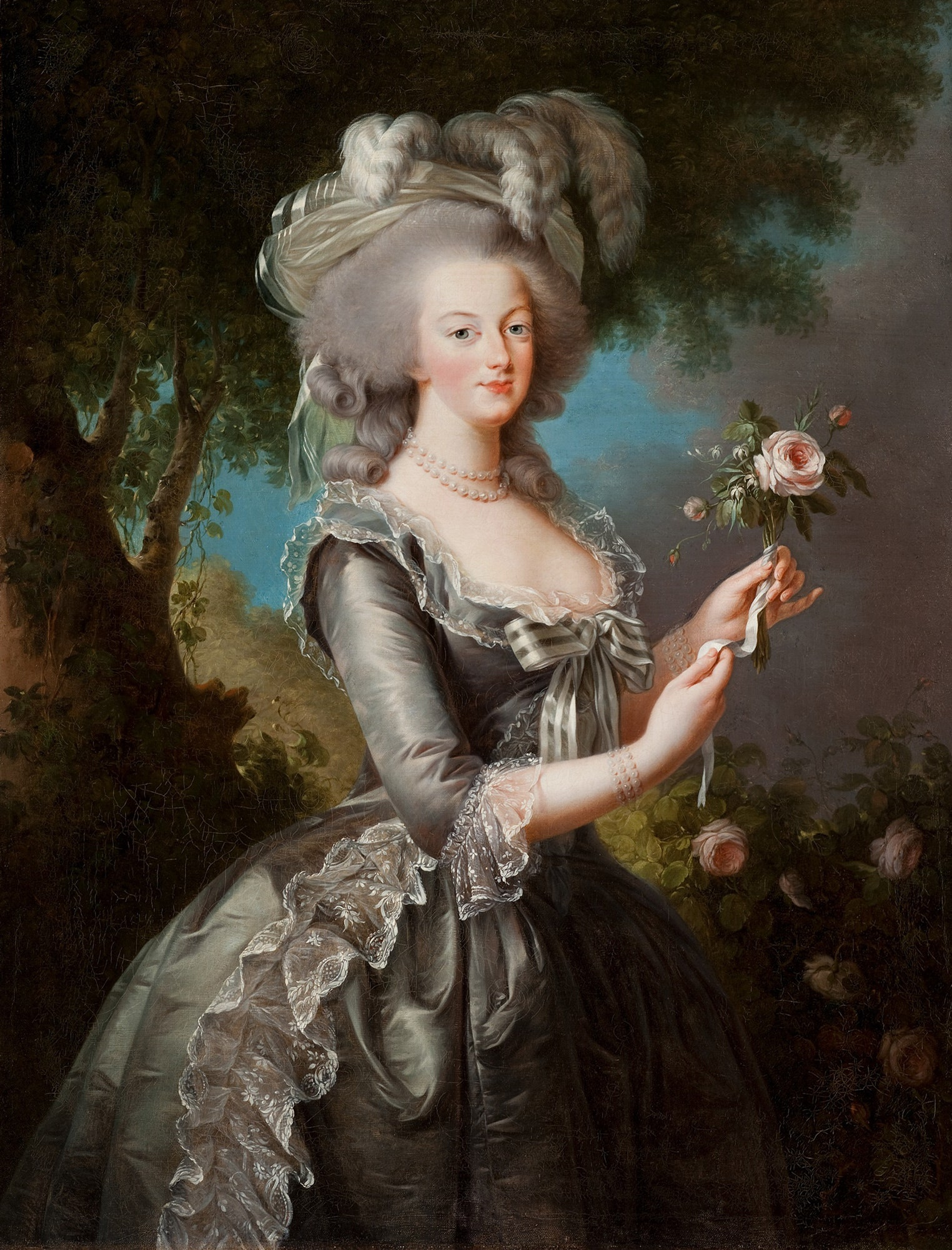
Marie Antoinette

== Madame Royale ==
This was the style of the eldest surviving daughter of the king. Those who held this honorific were:

- Princess Élisabeth of France, eldest daughter of King Henry IV of France (1553–1610) and his second wife, Queen Marie de' Medici (1575–1642). In 1615, Élisabeth was married to the future king, Philip IV of Spain (1605–1665). On her death in 1644, her younger sister, Christine Marie, succeeded to the style (see below).
- Princess Christine Marie of France (1606–1663), the second daughter of Henry IV and Marie de' Medici. In 1619, Christine was married to Victor Amadeus I, Duke of Savoy (1587–1637). She assumed the style of Madame Royale upon the death of her older sister, the Queen of Spain.
- Princess Marie-Thérèse of France (1667–1672), the only daughter of Louis XIV and Maria Theresa of Spain to live beyond infancy.
- Princess Marie Louise Élisabeth of France (1727–1759), eldest daughter of Louis XV and his queen, Maria Leszczyńska (1703–1768). As a twin, Louise-Élisabeth rarely if ever used this title. She preferred being called Madame Première, to distinguish herself from her younger twin, Henriette of France (1727–1752), who was referred to as Madame Seconde. See more on this below.
- Princess Marie-Thérèse Charlotte of France, eldest daughter of Louis XVI and Marie Antoinette. Marie-Thérèse was the sole member of her immediate family to survive the French Revolution. She also exerted a great deal of political influence during the Bourbon Restoration (1815–1830).

Between the death, in 1672, of Marie-Thérèse of France, the longest living daughter of Louis XIV and his Queen, and the birth, in 1727, of Louise Élisabeth of France, the eldest daughter of Louis XV, there were no legitimate daughters of a French king. Because of this, the style was occasionally used by the most senior unmarried princess at the French Court during that period. It was briefly used by the eldest niece of Louis XIV, Marie Louise d'Orléans (1662–1689), later known as just Mademoiselle. After her marriage to King Charles II of Spain (1661–1700), in 1679, the style was assumed briefly by her younger sister, Anne Marie d'Orléans (1669–1728), before she married Victor Amadeus II of Sardinia (1666–1732).

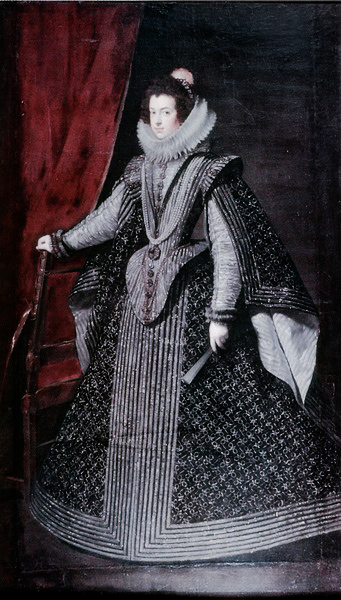
Élisabeth of France

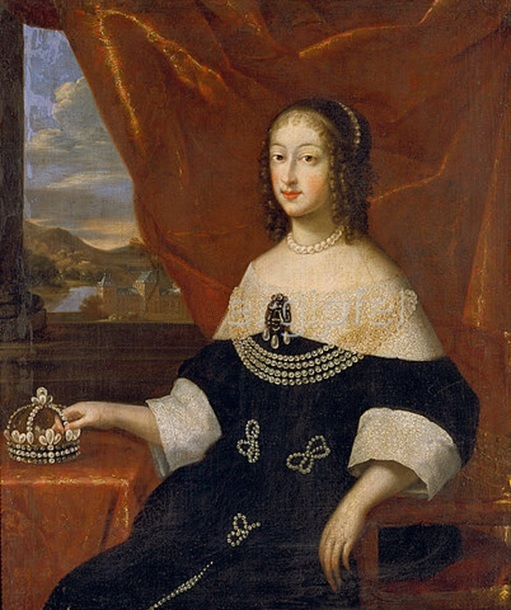
Princess Christine Marie of France and sister of Élisabeth. Madame Royal after her sister's marriage

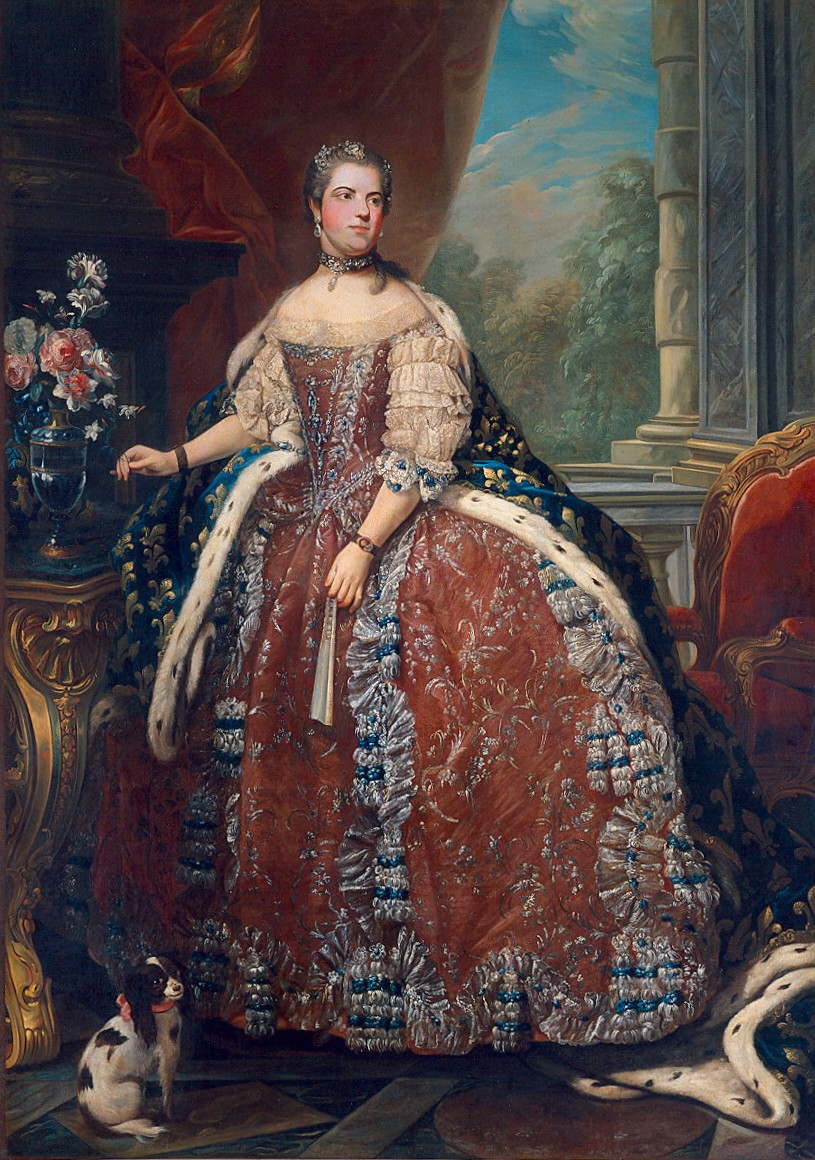
Princess Marie Louise Élisabeth of France, known as Madame Première because she was the eldest daughter of King Louis XV

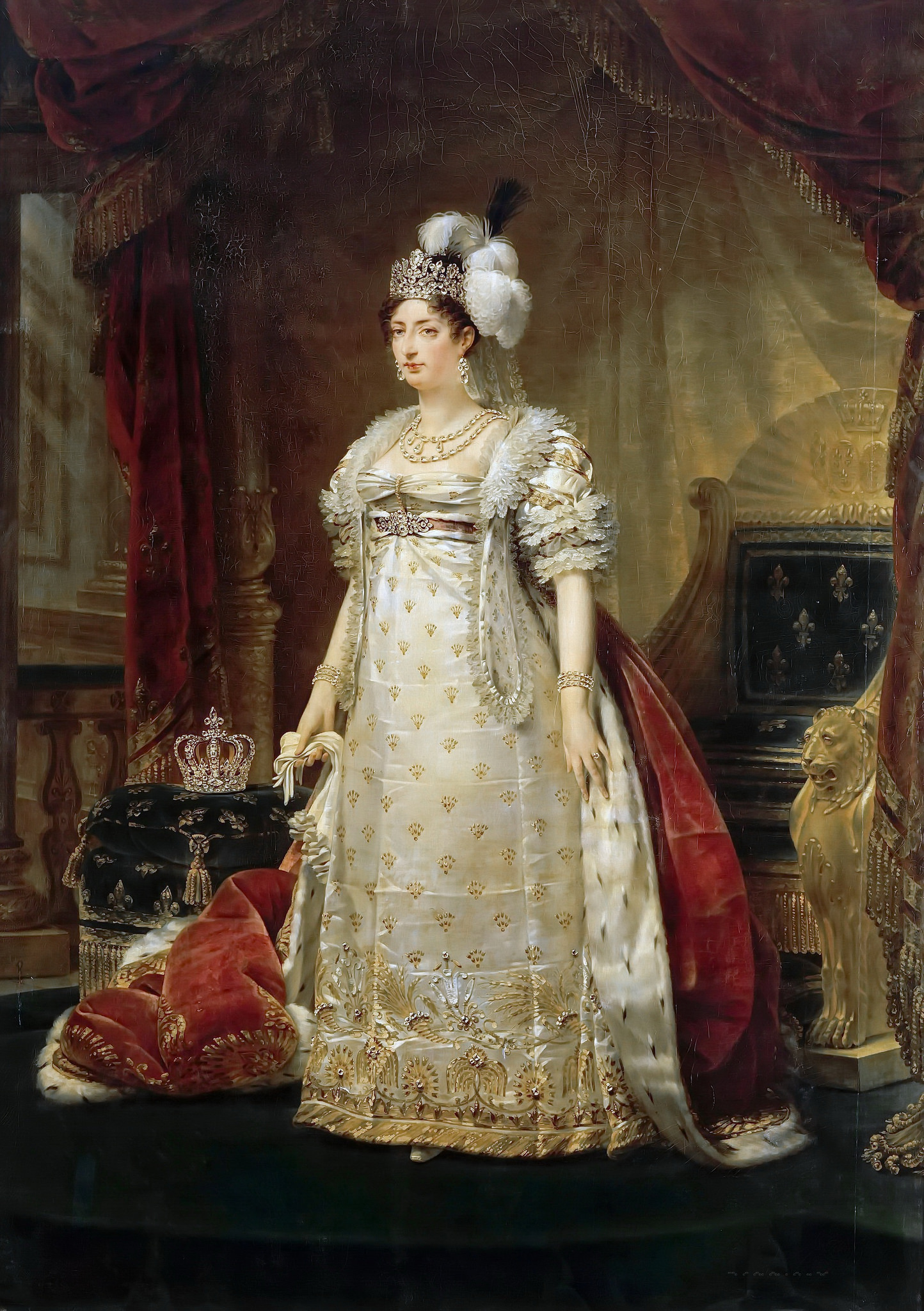
Marie-Thérèse known as Madame Royale, eldest daughter of Louis XVI

== Monsieur ==
This honorific belonged to the oldest living brother of the King. Among those who held this style were:

- Charles de Valois, Duke of Orléans (1550–1574), younger brother of Francis II (1544–1560), was known as Monsieur at the beginning of the reign of Francis II. He was King of France as Charles IX from 1560 to 1574;
- Henri de Valois, Duke of Anjou (1551–1589), younger brother of Francis II and Charles IX, was known as Monsieur during the reign of Charles IX. He became King of France as Henry III from 1574 to 1589;
- François de Valois, Duke of Anjou (1555–1584), youngest brother of Francis II, Charles IX and Henry III, was known as Monsieur during the reign of Henry III;
- Gaston of France, Duke of Orléans (1608–1660), younger brother of Louis XIII (1601–1643), was known as Monsieur during the reign of Louis XIII and was the first fils de France to assume the use of altesse royale abroad;
  - Philippe de France, duc d'Anjou (1640–1701), Gaston's nephew was known as le Petit Monsieur and Gaston as le Grand Monsieur when Louis XIII died in 1643;
- Philippe de France, Duke of Orléans (1640–1701) was the younger brother of Louis XIV, and known as Monsieur in 1660 after the death of his uncle, Gaston. He was the founder of the House of Orléans;
- Louis Stanislas Xavier of France, Count of Provence (1755–1824), younger brother of Louis XVI, known as Monsieur during the reign of Louis XVI, and was later King of France as Louis XVIII from 1814 to 1824;
- Charles Philippe of France, Count of Artois (1757–1836) was the youngest brother of Louis XVI and Louis XVIII, and known as Monsieur at the beginning of the reign of Louis XVIII, later King of France as Charles X from 1824 to 1830.
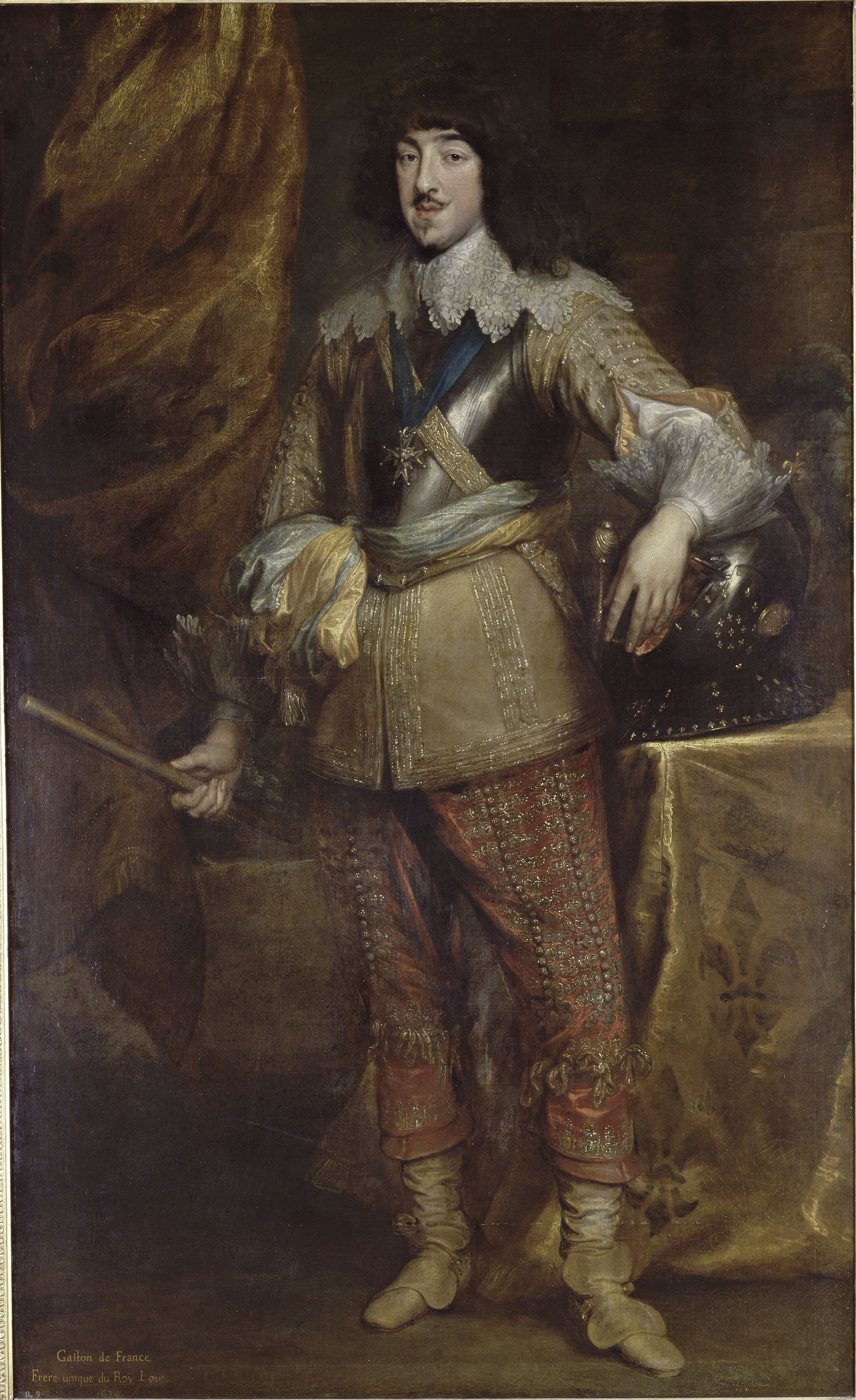
Gaston, le Grand Monsieur, son of Henry IV, brother of Louis XIII and uncle of Louis XIV

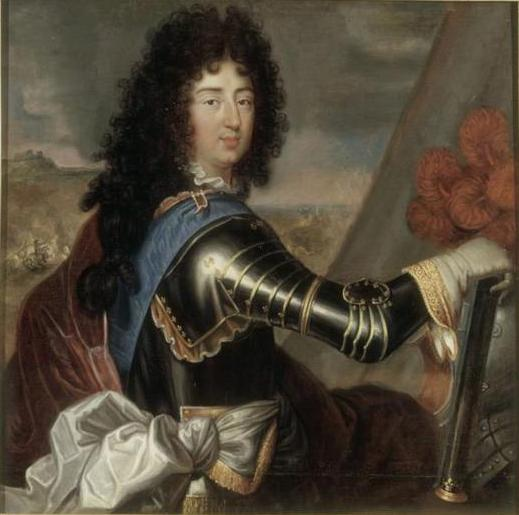
Philippe, le Petit Monsieur, younger brother of Louis XIV

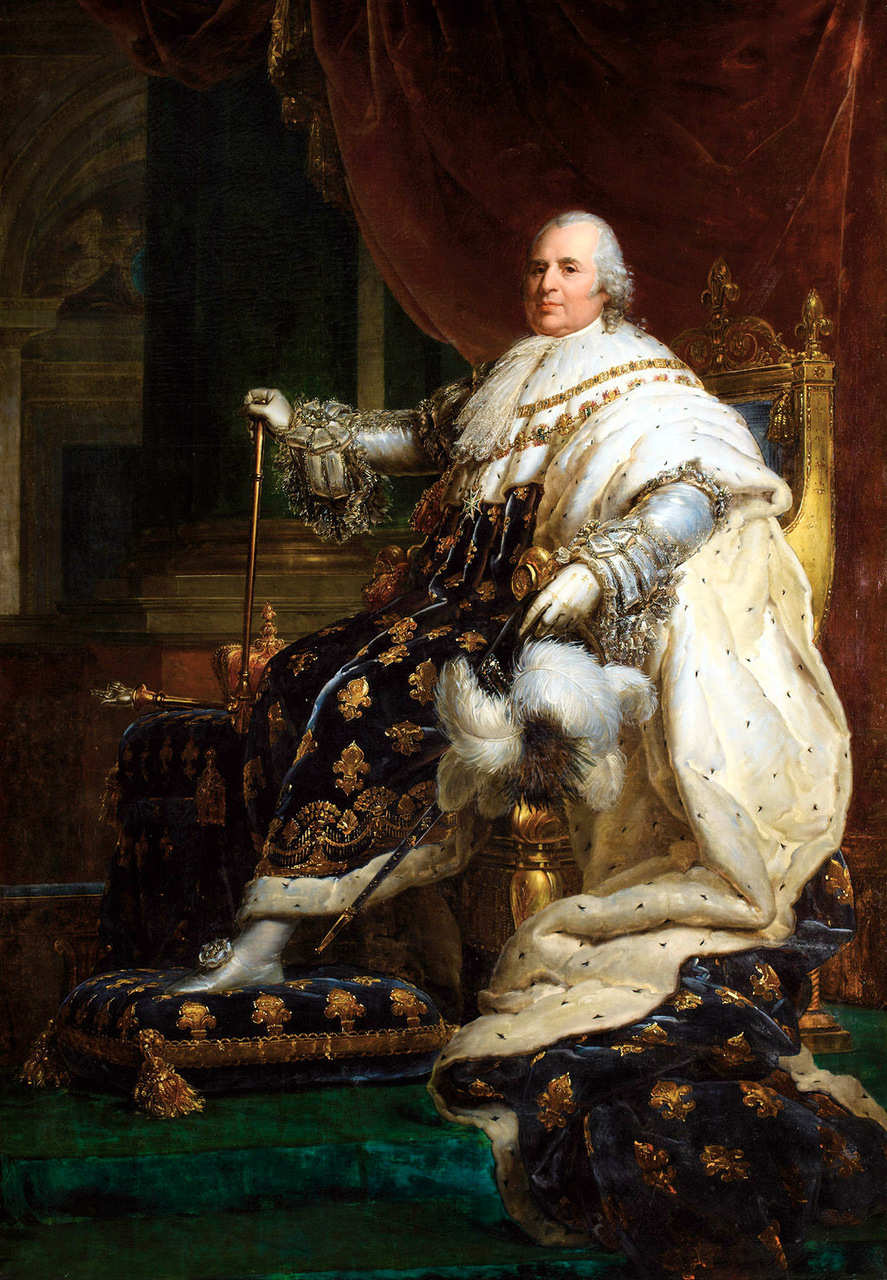
Louis Stanislas Xavier, Count of Provence

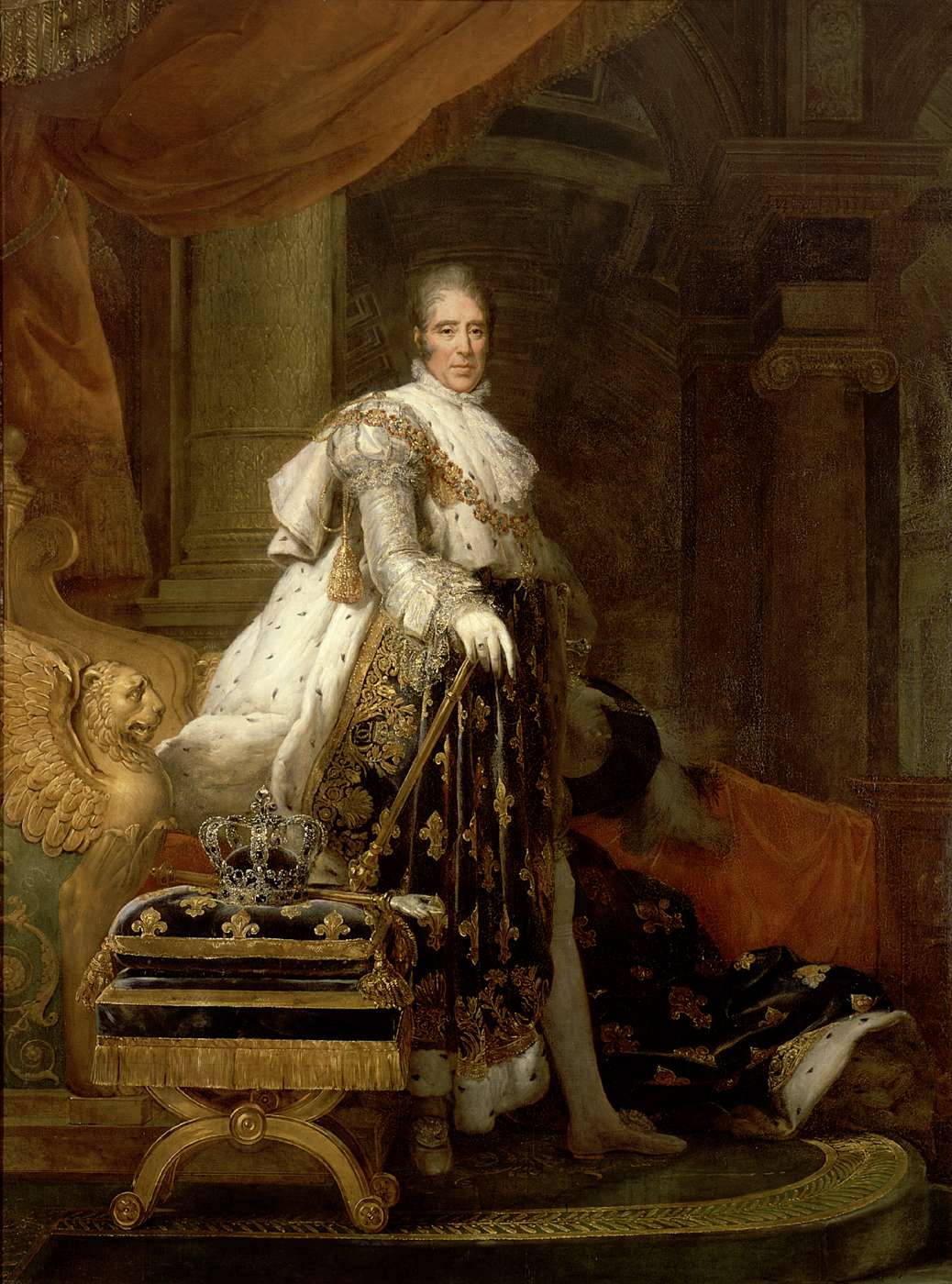
Charles Philippe, Count of Artois

== Madame ==
This was the style of the wife of Monsieur. Examples of this were:

- Marie de Bourbon, Duchess of Montpensier (1605–1627), first wife of Gaston d'Orléans (Monsieur) and mother of la Grande Mademoiselle (1627–1693).
- Marguerite of Lorraine (1615–1672), second wife of Gaston.
- Henrietta of England (1644–1670), the first wife of King Louis XIV's younger brother, Philippe, Duke of Orléans, (Monsieur).
- Elisabeth Charlotte, Princess Palatine (1652–1722), the second wife of Philippe I, duc d'Orléans (Monsieur).
- Marie Joséphine of Savoy (1753–1810), wife of the Count of Provence, the future Louis XVIII.
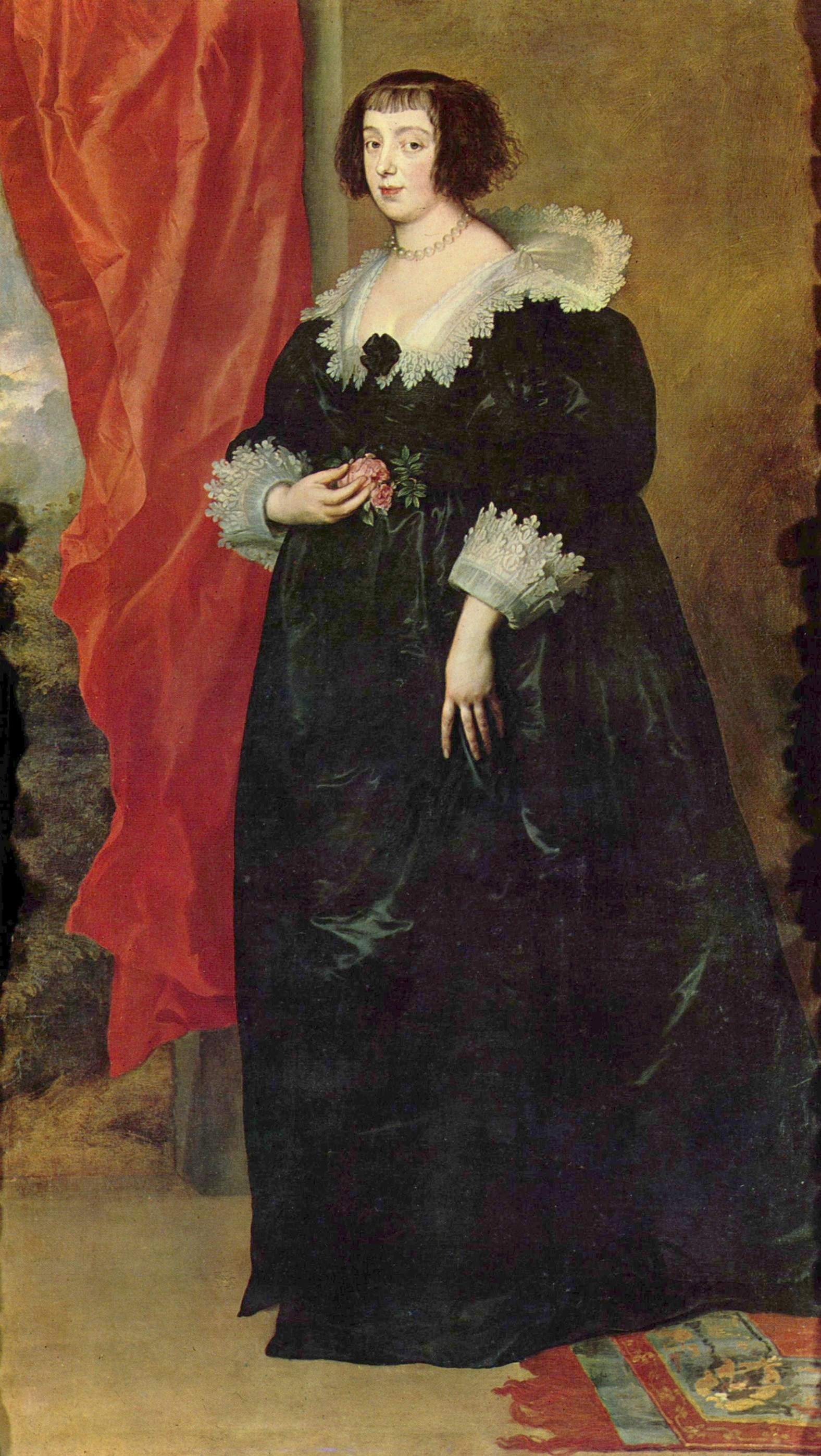
Marguerite of Lorraine

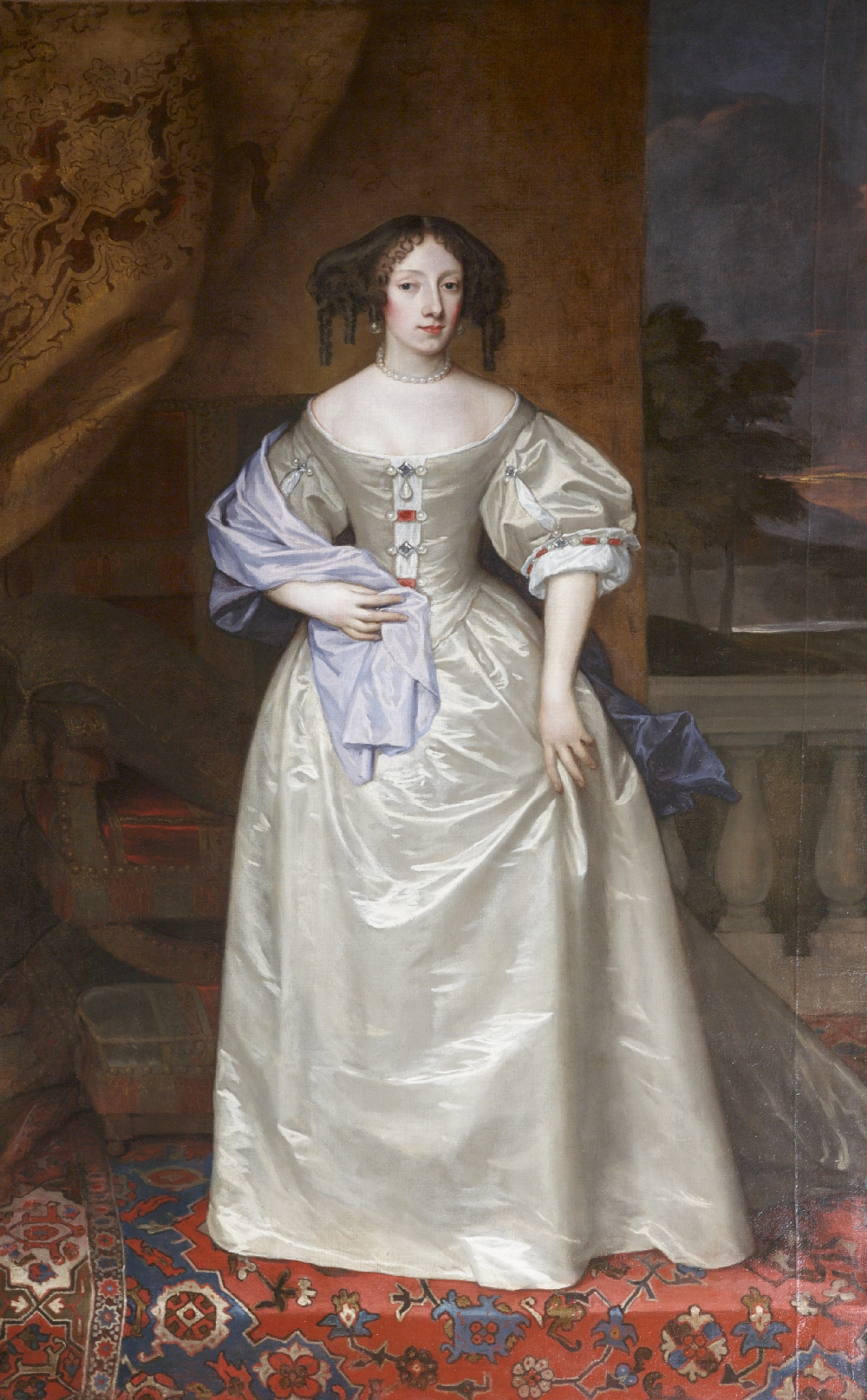
Henrietta of England

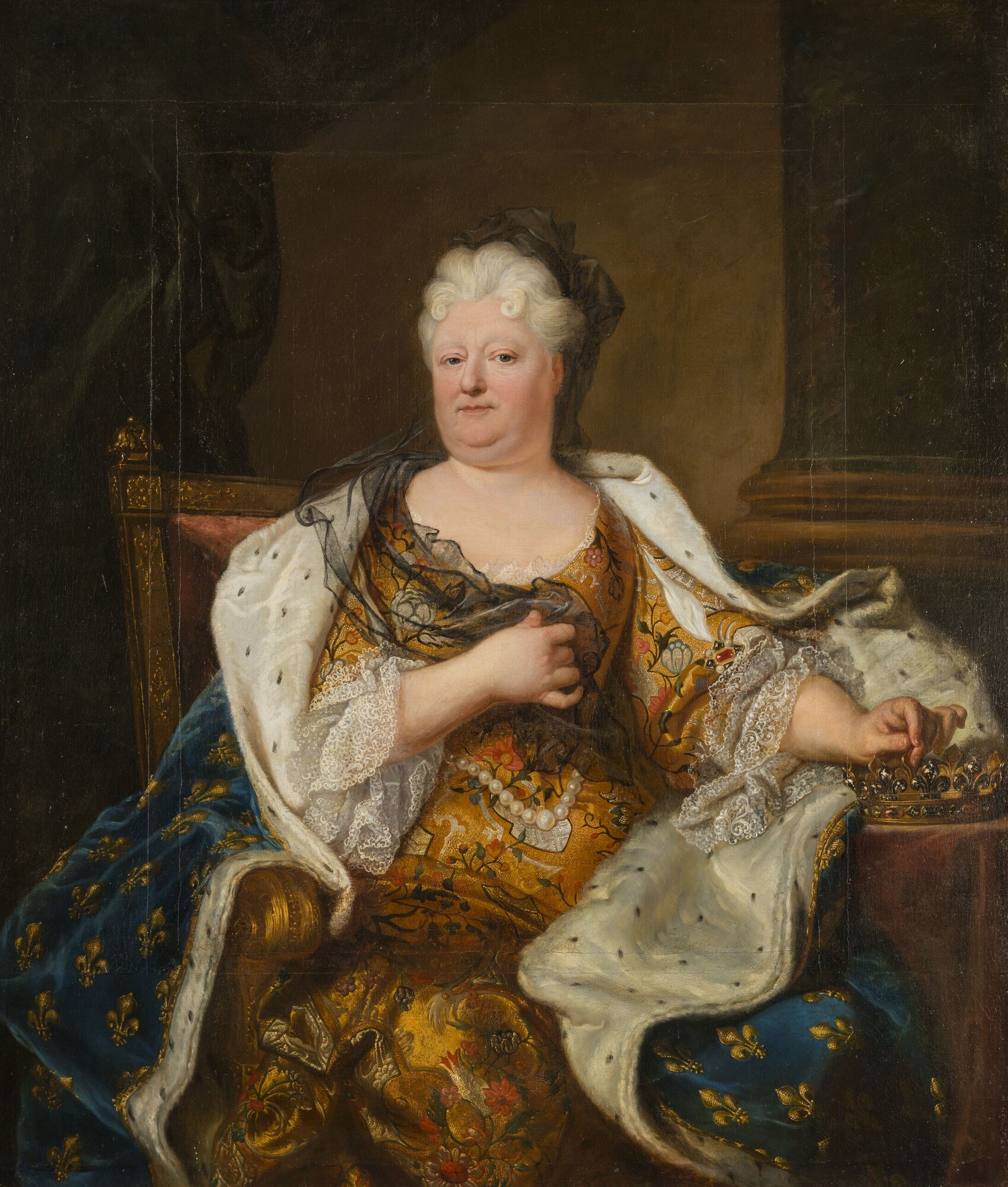
Elizabeth Charlotte, Madame Palatine

Marie Joséphine of Savoy

== Madame Première ==
King Louis XV and his wife, Marie Leszczyńska, had ten children, eight of whom were girls. To distinguish between these eight princesses, the daughters were known in birth order as Madame 'number', such as Madame Première, Madame Seconde, etc. This style was not a traditional right and was merely a way the court used to distinguish between the many daughters of Louis XV.

- Princess Marie Louise Élisabeth (1727–1759), twin with her younger sister, Henriette; married Philip, Duke of Parma (1720–1765), who was also an infante of Spain. Before her marriage, she was known as Madame Première. After her marriage she was the Duchess of Parma, and as such was known as Madame Infante, duchesse de Parme.
- Princess Anne Henriette (1727–1752), twin with her older sister, Louise-Élisabeth, known as Madame Seconde.
- Princess Marie Louise (1728–1733), known as Madame Troisième.
- Princess Marie Adélaïde (1732–1800), originally known as Madame Quatrième; after her elder sister died in 1733, she was known as Madame Troisième. Later, she was known as Madame Adélaïde.
- Princess Marie Louise Thérèse Victoire (1733–1799), originally known as Madame Quatrième, and later as Madame Victoire.
- Princess Sophie Philippine Élisabeth Justine (1734–1782), Madame Cinquième, known later as Madame Sophie.
- Princess Marie Thérèse Félicité (1736–1744), known as Madame Sixième.
- Princess Louise-Marie (1737–1787), originally, known as Madame Septième or Madame Dernière; known later as Madame Louise.

== Petit-fils de France ==
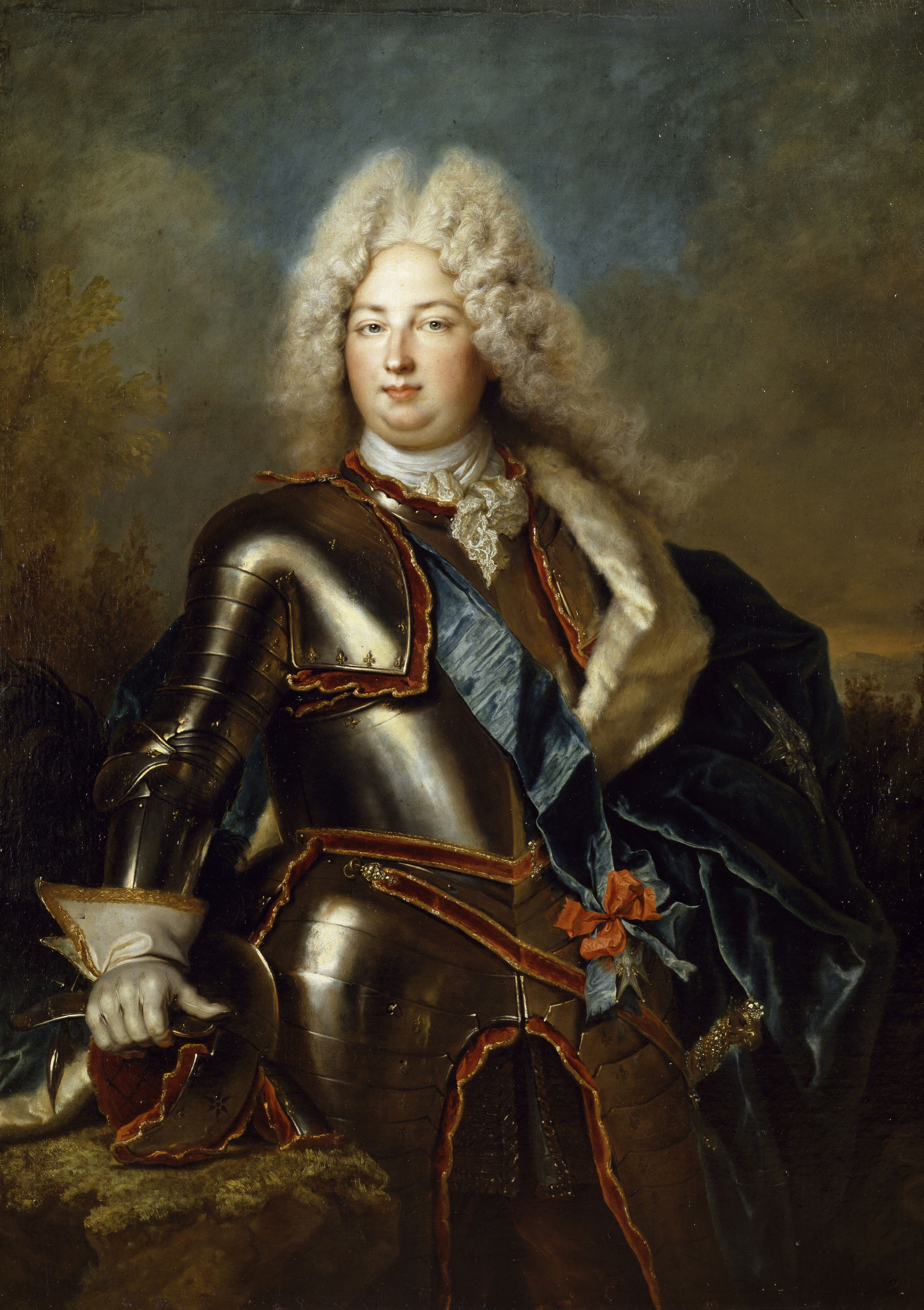
Monseigneur le Duc de Berry.

Petit-fils de France ("Grandson of France"). This was the style and rank accorded to the sons of the fils de France, who were themselves the sons of the kings and dauphins of France. However, as surnames, they used the paternal main peerage title. Females had the style petite-fille de France ("Granddaughter of France").

The petits-enfants de France, like the enfants de France, were entitled to be addressed as son altesse royale ("His/Her Royal Highness"). Additionally, they traveled and lodged wherever the king did, could dine with him, and were entitled to an armchair in his presence.

Yet as hosts, they only offered armchairs to foreign monarchs—whom they addressed as Monseigneur rather than "Sire". Nor did they pay visits to foreign ambassadors, nor extend to them a hand in greeting. They only wore full mourning for deceased members of the royal family.

When entering a town, they were greeted with a presentation of arms by the royal garrison, by the firing of cannon, and by a delegation of local officials. However, only the sons and daughters of France were entitled to dine au grand couvert, that is, alone on a canopied dais amidst non-royal onlookers.

== Mademoiselle ==
This style was usually held by the eldest daughter of Monsieur and his wife, Madame. Those who held this style were:

- Anne Marie Louise d'Orléans (1627–1693), the eldest daughter of Gaston de France.
- Marie Louise d'Orléans (1662–1689), the eldest daughter of King Louis XIV's younger brother, Philippe I, duc d'Orléans; later the wife of King Charles II of Spain.
- Anne Marie d'Orléans (1669–1728) held the style (along with Madame Royale) after the marriage of her sister Marie Louise. She was the mother of Princess Maria Adelaide of Savoy - later the Dauphine of France.
- Élisabeth Charlotte d'Orléans (1674–1744), youngest child of Philippe I, duc d'Orléans and his second wife. Married to the Duke of Lorraine, she was the paternal grandmother of Queen Marie Antoinette.
- Louise Anne de Bourbon (1695–1758), fourth child of Louis III, Prince of Condé, was given the style of Mademoiselle as her cousin Louis d'Orléans had no daughter. When Louis's daughter Louise Marie was born in 1726, the title went to her. Louise Marie died in 1728 and the style reverted to Louise-Anne.
- Louise Marie d'Orléans (1726–1728), only daughter of Louis d'Orléans and his wife Margravine Auguste Marie Johanna of Baden-Baden; died in childhood.
- Louise Marie Thérèse Bathilde d'Orléans (1750–1822), daughter of the Duke of Orléans, was known as Mademoiselle from her birth. She was the sister of Philippe Égalité.
- Sophie d'Artois (1776–1783) was the first daughter of Princess Maria Theresa of Savoy (1756–1805) and her husband, born Charles Philippe of France (1757–1836).

Younger daughters of Monsieur were named after one of his appanages, e.g. Mademoiselle de Chartres (1676–1744), the third surviving daughter of Philippe I, duc d'Orléans.

This custom was not confined to the royal family. Even untitled noble families followed the same habit.

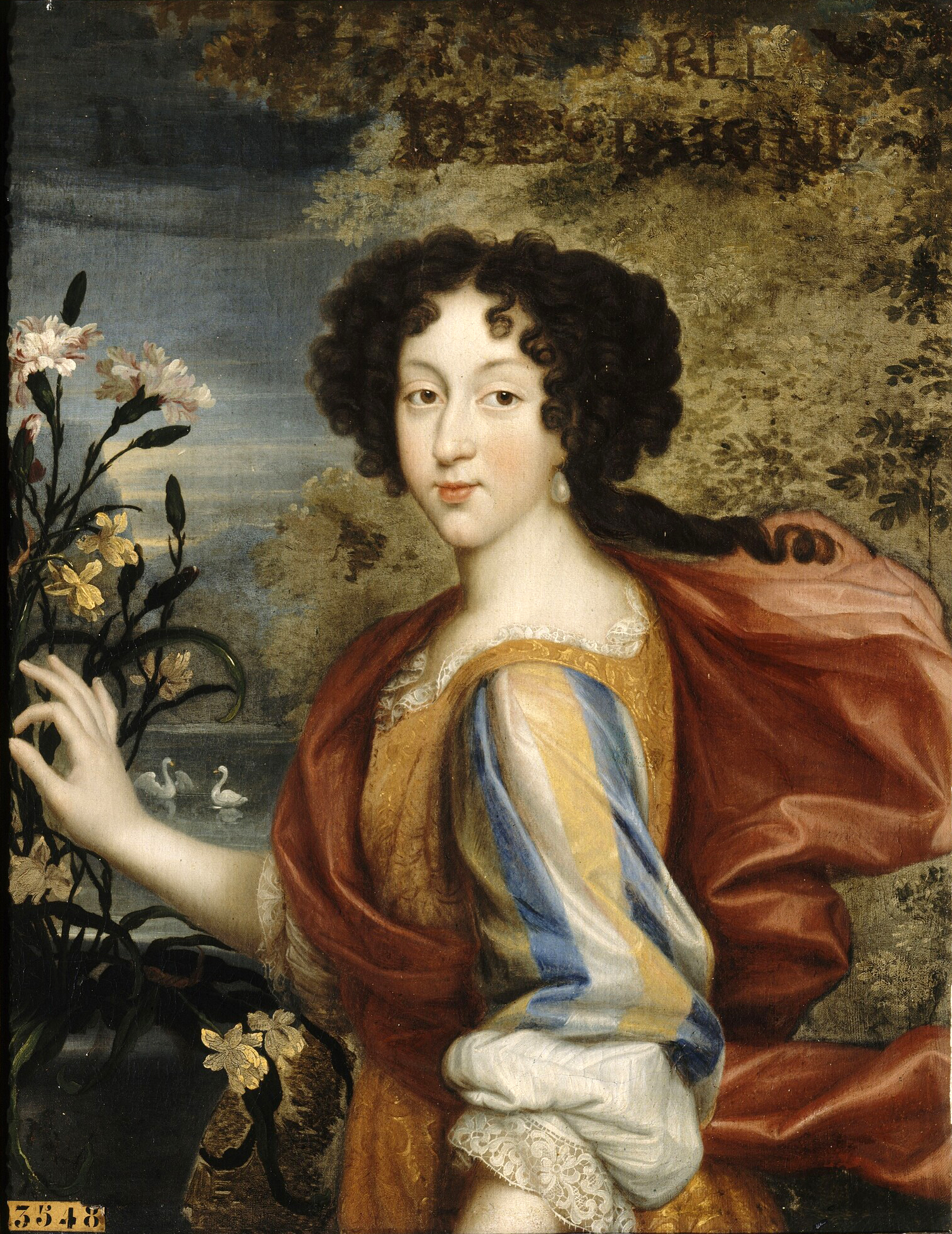
Mademoiselle, eldest daughter of le Petit Monsieur and the first Madame.

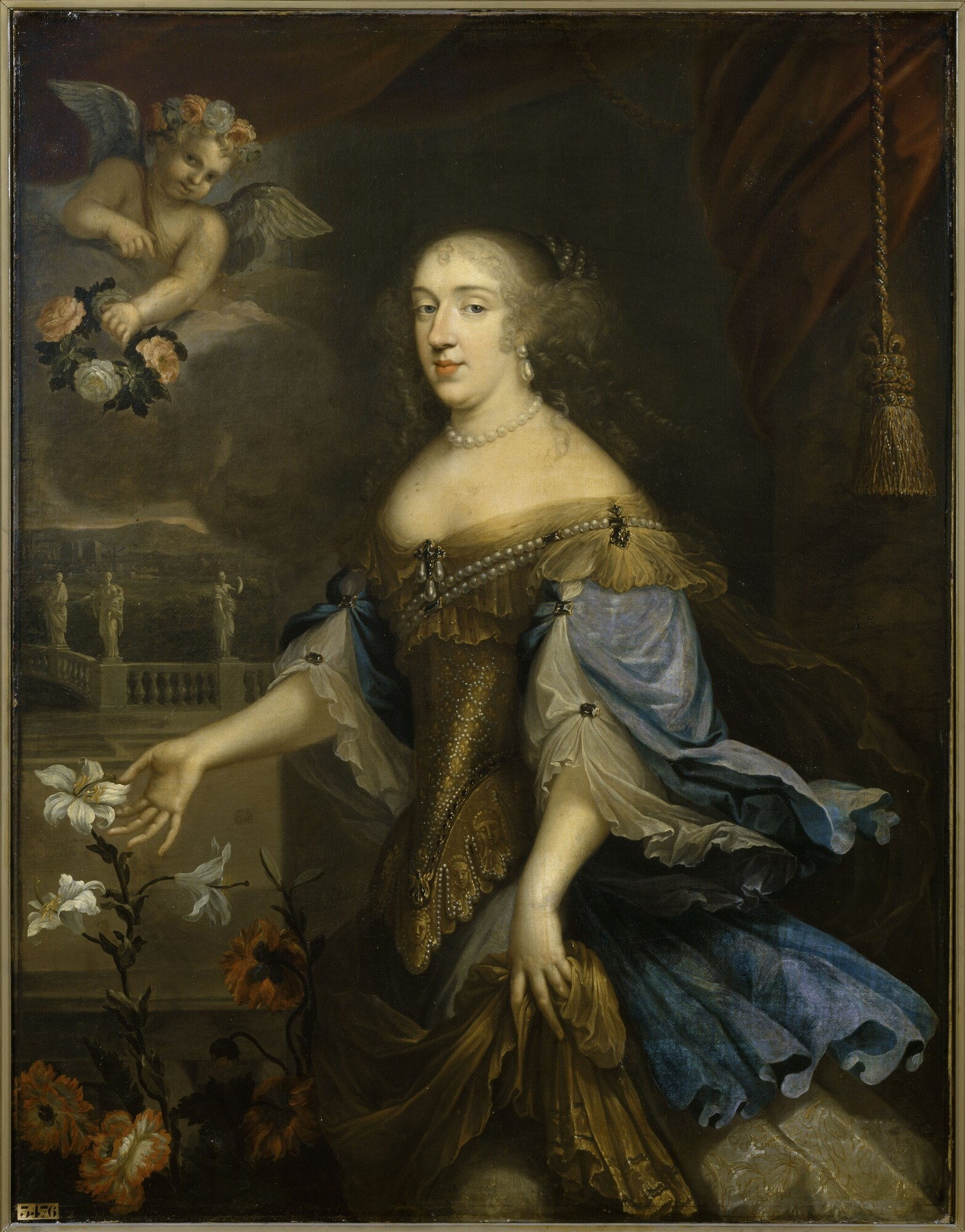
La Grande Mademoiselle, daughter of Gaston d'Orléans.

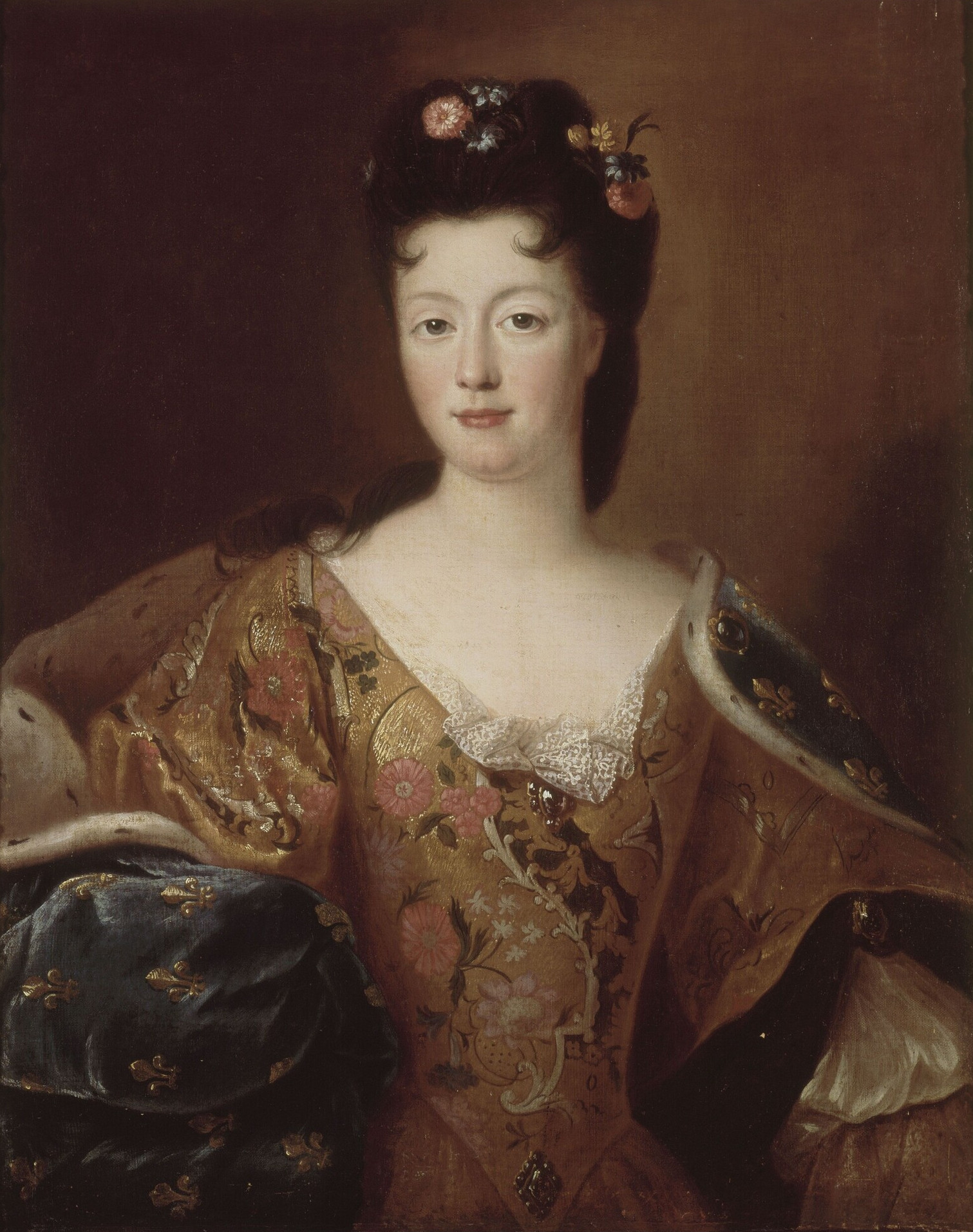
Élisabeth Charlotte d'Orléans - Mademoiselle de Chartres then Mademoiselle after her sisters marriage, Anne Marie

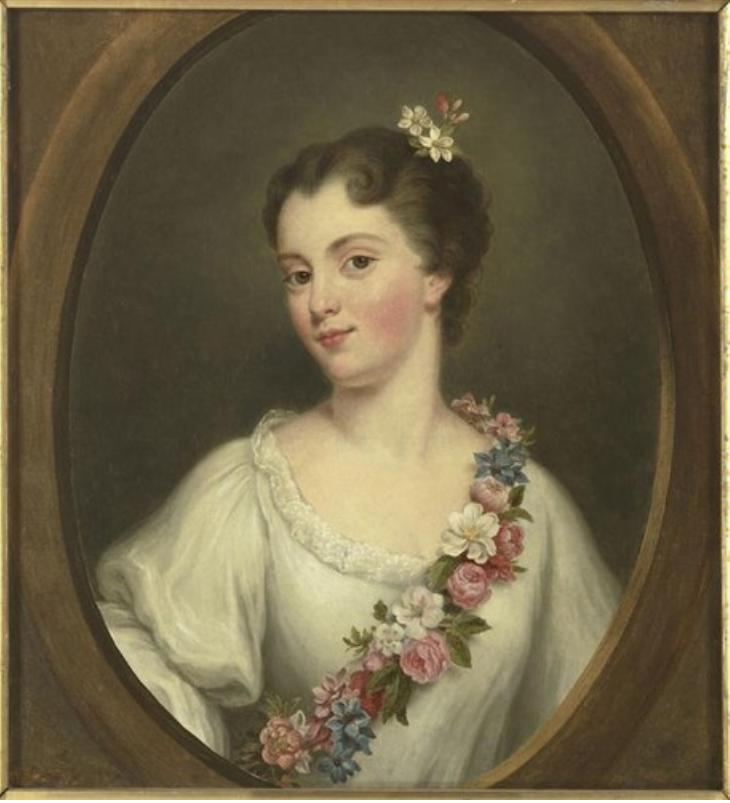
Louise Anne de Bourbon

=== La Grande Mademoiselle ===
After 1662, Anne Marie Louise d'Orléans, Duchess of Montpensier, who was originally called Mademoiselle as the eldest daughter of Gaston duc d'Orléans, became known as la Grande Mademoiselle at court, in order to distinguish her from her younger cousin, Marie Louise d'Orléans, now also called Mademoiselle, as the daughter of Anne's first cousin, the new Monsieur. After her death in 1693, the style of Grande Mademoiselle was not used again. Thus, this was not an official style but simply a means the court used to distinguish between the two princesses who held the style of Mademoiselle at the same time.

== See also ==
- Monsieur
- Madame
- Prince du sang
- Infante and its feminine form, infanta, for princes and princesses of Spain and Portugal
