= Louis, Duke of Brittany (1707–1712) =

Heir apparent to the French throne (1707–1712)

Louis
- Dauphin of France; Duke of Brittany
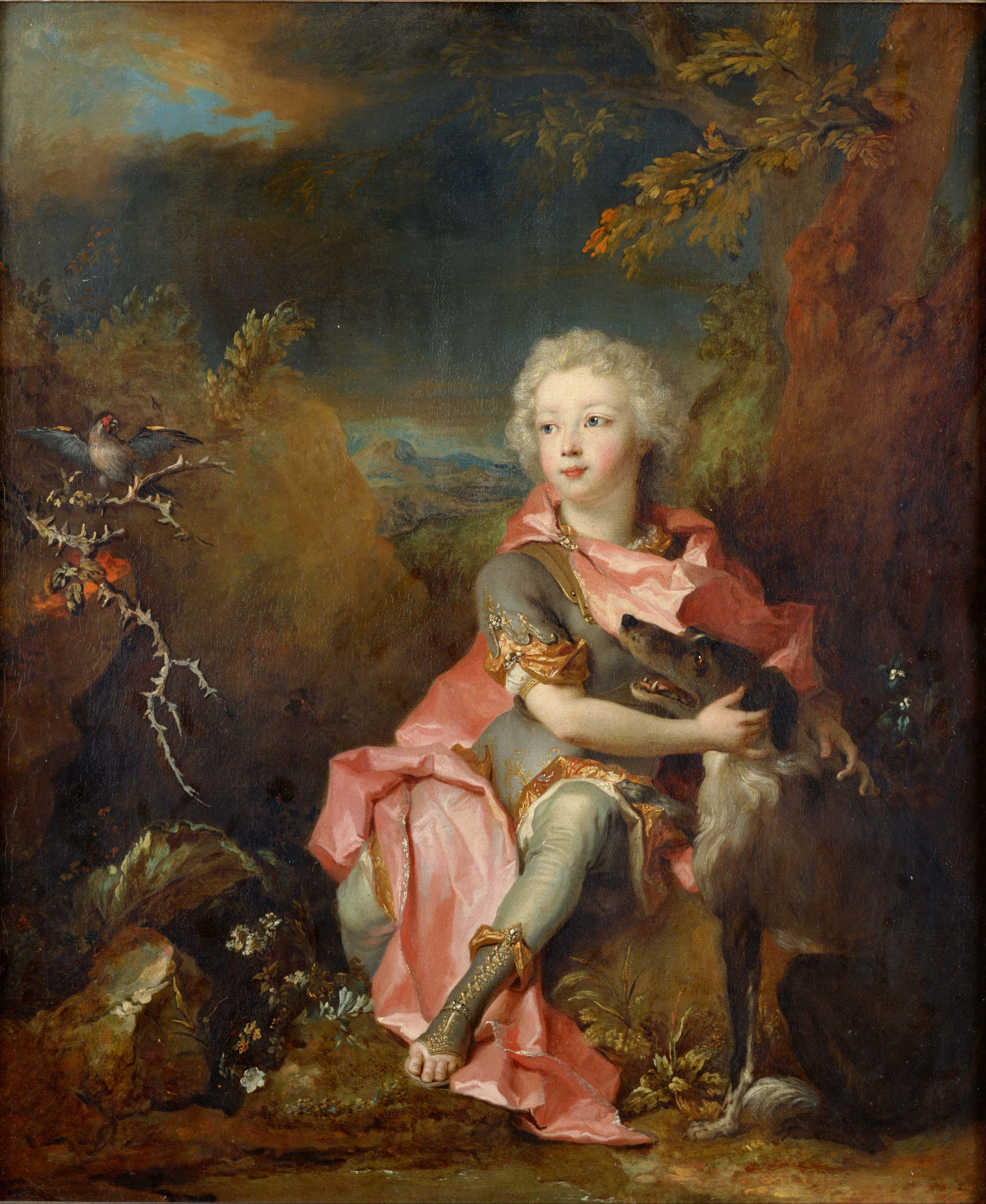
- Portrait by Nicolas de Largillière, c. 1714
- Born: 8 January 1707; Palace of Versailles, Kingdom of France
- Died: 8 March 1712 (aged 5); Palace of Versailles, Kingdom of France
- Burial: Basilica of St Denis
- House: Bourbon
- Father: Louis, Duke of Burgundy
- Mother: Marie Adélaïde of Savoy

Louis, Duke of Brittany (8 January 1707 – 8 March 1712) was Heir Apparent of France, the second son of Louis, Duke of Burgundy, and Marie Adélaïde of Savoy.

The eldest surviving son of the Dauphin, he was a fils de France. Louis was born at Versailles to the Duke and Duchess of Burgundy. He was created the Duke of Brittany succeeding his late brother Louis, who was the first to hold the title in 200 years. At the time of his birth, Louis was the third-in-line to the throne, following his father and grandfather Louis, le Grand Dauphin. He was preceded in birth by an elder brother, also named Louis, who was born in 1704 and died in infancy the following year.

Due to the deaths of his grandfather in 1711 and his father in 1712, he was heir apparent to his great-grandfather Louis XIV as Dauphin of France for three weeks in 1712. He was raised under the supervision of the royal governess Louise de Prie. Like his parents, he too died of measles and was buried in the Basilica of St Denis. His younger brother became the Dauphin and eventually succeeded as King Louis XV in 1715.

== Ancestry ==
Ancestors of Louis of France

8. Louis XIV of France
4. Louis, Dauphin of France
9. Maria Theresa of Austria
2. Louis, Duke of Burgundy
10. Ferdinand Maria, Elector of Bavaria
5. Maria Anna Victoria of Bavaria
11. Henriette Adelaide of Savoy
1. Louis of France
12. Charles Emmanuel II, Duke of Savoy
6. Victor Amadeus II of Sardinia
13. Marie Jeanne Baptiste of Savoy
3. Marie Adélaïde of Savoy
14. Philippe I, Duke of Orléans
7. Anne Marie of Orléans
15. Henrietta of England

Louis, Duke of Brittany (1707–1712) House of Bourbon Cadet branch of the Capetian dynasty Born: 8 January 1707 Died: 8 March 1712
French royalty
Preceded by Louis, le Petit Dauphin	Dauphin of France; 18 February 1712 – 8 March 1712	Succeeded by Louis as future Louis XV
