= Marie Adélaïde of Savoy =

Dauphine of France (1685–1712)

- Dauphine of France; Duchess of Burgundy
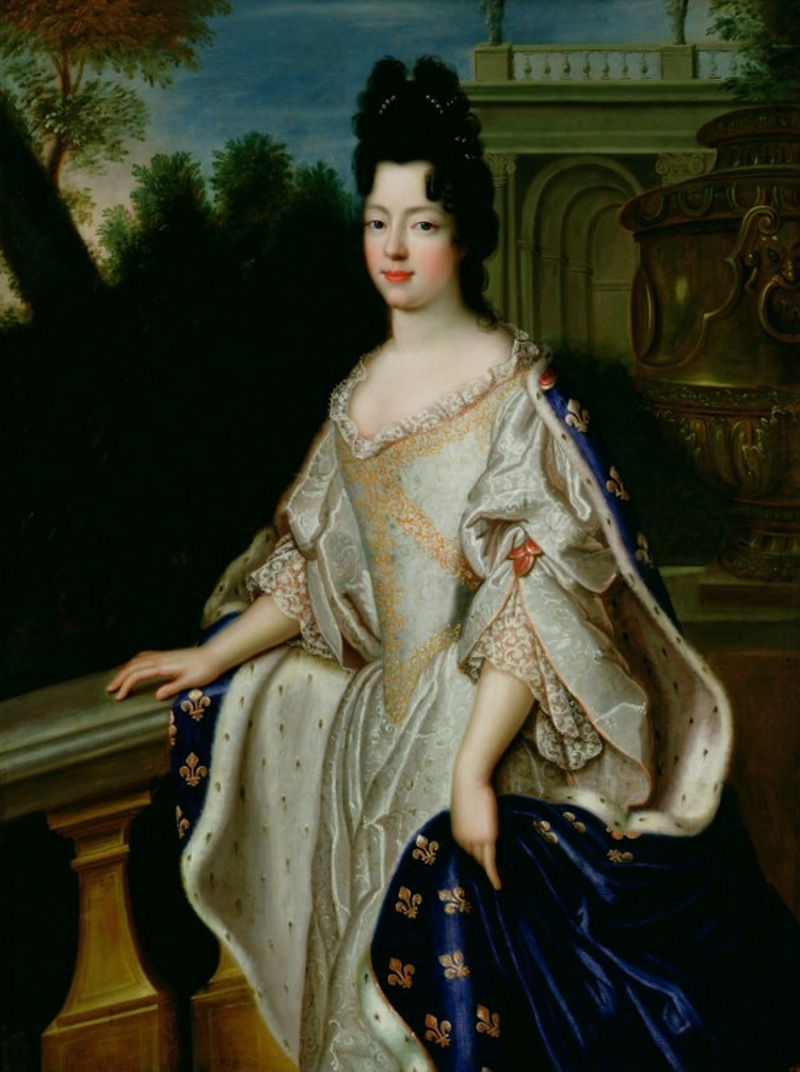
- Marie Adélaïde wearing Fleur-de-lis as Duchess of Burgundy, c. 1697
- Born: 6 December 1685; Royal Palace of Turin, Savoyard state
- Died: 12 February 1712 (aged 26); Palace of Versailles, France
- Burial: 23 February 1712; Basilica of St Denis
- Spouse: Louis, Dauphin of France (m. 1697)
- Issue Detail: Louis, Duke of Brittany; Louis, Duke of Brittany; Louis XV
Names
- Italian: Maria Adelaide di Savoia; French: Marie Adélaïde de Savoie
- House: Savoy
- Father: Victor Amadeus II, Duke of Savoy
- Mother: Anne Marie d'Orléans

Princess Marie Adélaïde of Savoy (6 December 1685 – 12 February 1712) was the wife of Louis, Duke of Burgundy, the Dauphin of France. She was the eldest daughter of Victor Amadeus II, Duke of Savoy, and of Anne Marie d'Orléans. Her betrothal to the Duke of Burgundy in June 1696 was part of the Treaty of Turin, signed on 29 August 1696. She was the mother of the future King Louis XV. Styled as Duchess of Burgundy after her marriage, she became Dauphine of France upon the death of her father-in-law, Louis, Grand Dauphin, in 1711. She died of measles in 1712, followed by her husband a week later.

== Early life and background ==
Born at the Royal Palace of Turin in December 1685, she was originally named Maria Adelaide. She was the eldest daughter of Victor Amadeus II (who had been Duke of Savoy since 1675) and his French wife Anne Marie d'Orléans, a niece of Louis XIV, and the daughter of Philippe of France, Duke of Orléans, and Henrietta of England. Her birth nearly cost her sixteen-year-old mother her life. As a female, she was not eligible to inherit the Duchy of Savoy due to salic law. Her grandmother Marie Jeanne of Savoy and the Prince of Carignan acted as godparents. Marie Adélaïde enjoyed a particularly close relationship with her grandmother as well as her mother who, despite protocol, was raising her children herself, which was quite unusual among royalty during the era. As children, she and her sister Maria Luisa frequented the Vigno di Madama outside Turin, and paid weekly visits to their grandmother at the Palazzo Madama in Turin.

Marie Adelaide was beautiful, but also tiny, even described as "doll-sized". Growing up, she was skinny. When Louis, Duke of Burgundy, her future husband, saw her for the first time, he was so surprised by her beauty that he wished to marry her immediately. Her hair was chestnut in her youth, and darkened as she grew up. Her eyes were large and black, surrounded by long eyelashes.

== Betrothal and marriage ==
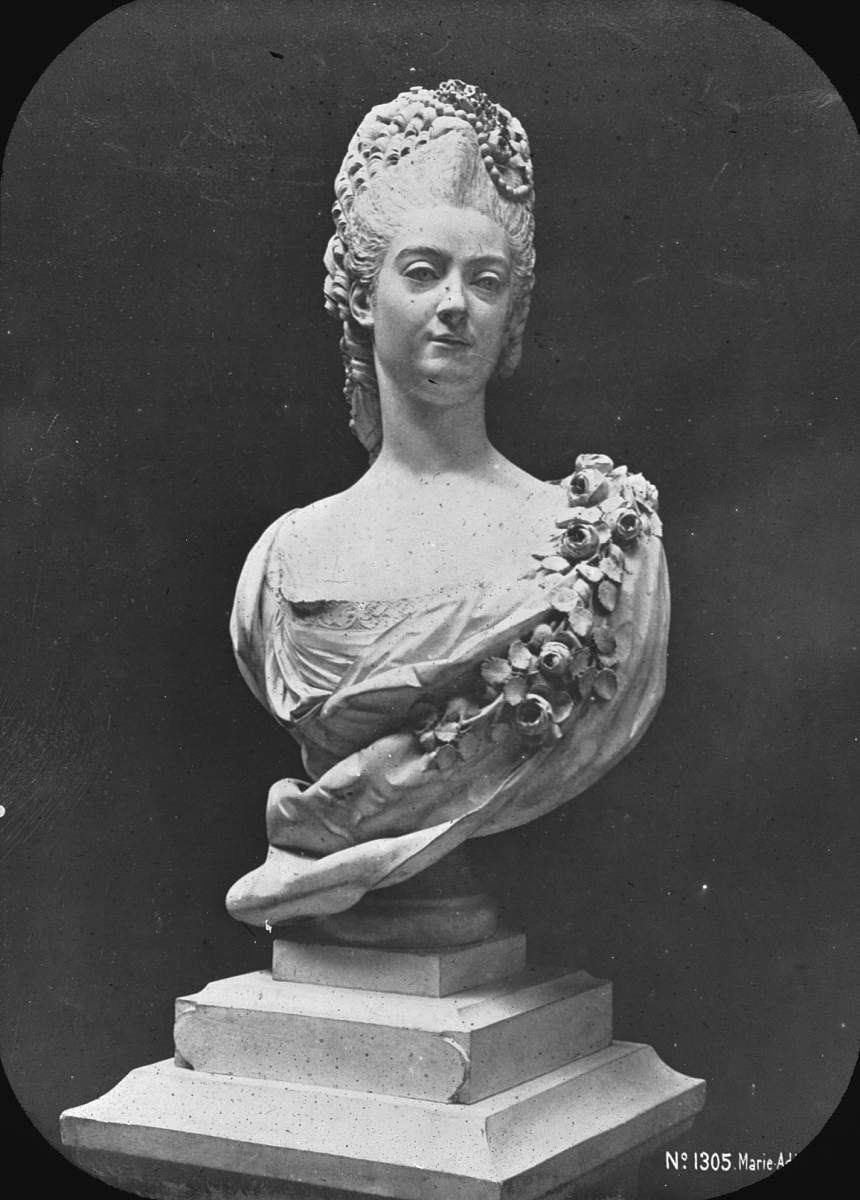
Bust of Marie Adelaide de Bourgogne by Coysevox. Brooklyn Museum Archives, Goodyear Archival Collection

The marriage of Marie Adélaïde came as a result of the Treaty of Turin signed on 29 August 1696. This treaty between her father and Louis XIV agreed that her father would support France in the Nine Years' War. Her father's dominions had been ravaged during the war.

Victor Amadeus had first proposed Marie Adélaïde as a candidate for marriage with the Archduke Joseph, but Emperor Leopold I had declined because of their young age. The Treaty of Turin was negotiated under the influence of the Maréchal de Tessé, who suggested that Marie Adelaïde be sent to France to perfect her education before marrying the French prince.

Upon her arrival in France, Louis XIV, who had come to greet her, met her in Montargis on 4 November 1696, and was quite pleased with "the Princess". As she was still a girl of 11 years, the marriage did not take place immediately. Instead, three days a week, she was a pupil at the Maison royale de Saint-Louis, the girls' school Madame de Maintenon had founded in 1684 in Saint-Cyr, in the vicinity of Versailles.

On 6 December 1697, on her twelfth birthday, Marie Adelaïde was formally married to the Duke of Burgundy in the Palace of Versailles. The event took place after the signing of the Treaty of Ryswick which ended the Nine Years' War. Her husband was the eldest son of Le Grand Dauphin and Maria Anna Victoria of Bavaria.

== Duchess of Burgundy ==
The new Duchess of Burgundy had a close relationship with the king and with Madame de Maintenon. Her arrival in Versailles was described "like a breath of fresh air," reviving the dull court. She also maintained an ongoing correspondence with her parents and grandmother back in Savoy.

When she compared herself to the Duke of Burgundy’s mother, the deceased Maria Anna Victoria of Bavaria, she knew a beautiful woman would replace the dull, unattractive and sickly woman at court. Although not proven, it is said that when she mentioned it to Louis XIV, who agreed on Maria Anna Victoria’s ugliness, she said: “The late Madame la Dauphine in bed must wanted to consummate with the Dauphin, but while in bed, the Dauphin wanted to be like you with all of your beautiful, attractive mistresses, surrounded with it in bed, with chocolate covered strawberries, sweet pastries, and a bottle of champagne!” And the King replied with: “My son will follow the French royal tradition of mistresses!” The king had many mistresses, at the time, his current mistress was the Françoise d’Aubigné.

Louis de Rouvroy in his memoirs, depicts the dauphine as an accomplished woman at court, full of spirit and energy.

She used her influence over the aging king to prevent her political enemies from furthering their causes. This group, known as the cabale de Meudon, devoted themselves to her father-in-law, hoping to secure themselves in his expected reign upon the death of Louis XIV. Her great enemy was the Duchess of Bourbon, a legitimated daughter of Louis XIV and his mistress, Madame de Montespan. The Duchess of Bourbon wanted her daughter Mademoiselle de Bourbon to wed Charles, Duke of Berry, youngest son of the Grand Dauphin. To maintain her influence over her grandfather-in-law, the Duchess of Burgundy organized Berry's marriage to Marie Louise Élisabeth d'Orléans, the eldest daughter of Philippe d'Orléans, Duke of Orléans and of his wife Françoise Marie de Bourbon. The influential Marie Adélaïde also brought about the disgrace of Louis Joseph, Duke of Vendôme, the great military man of the era.

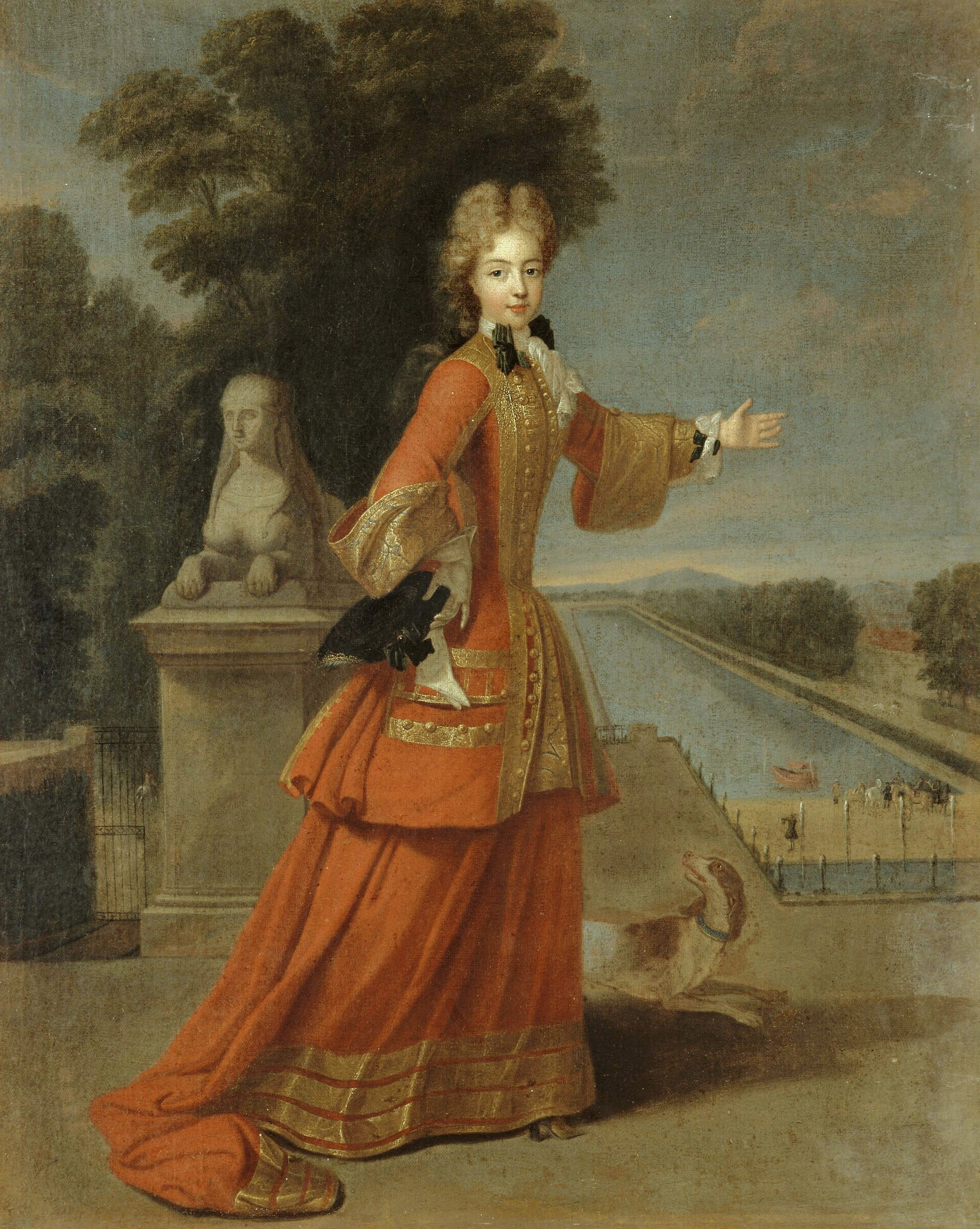
Portrait of the Duchess of Burgundy by Pierre Gobert

The Duchess of Burgundy gave birth to her first child in 1704. The child, a short-lived boy, was given the title Duke of Brittany before his death in 1705. Marie Adélaïde bore two more children in 1707 and 1710. Her youngest son, the only child to survive beyond childhood, later became King Louis XV.

== Dauphine of France ==
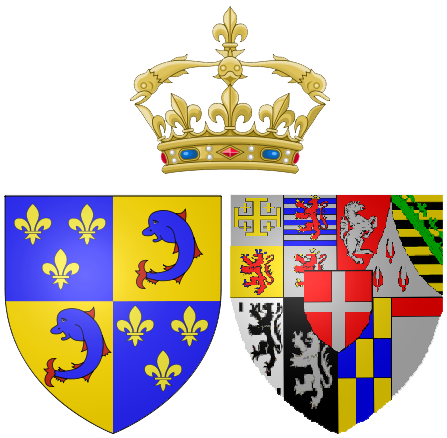
Arms of Marie Adélaïde as Dauphine of France

In early April 1711, her father-in-law Le Grand Dauphin caught smallpox and died on 14 April at the Château de Meudon. Upon the death of Le Grand Dauphin, Marie Adélaïde's husband became Dauphin of France and she Dauphine of France.

The mourning court traveled to Fontainebleau in February 1712. At Fontainebleau, Marie Adélaïde caught a fever which escalated in measles. Having been bled and given emetics, she died in Versailles at the age of 26. Louis XIV and Madame de Maintenon were plunged into sadness. Madame Palatine later said that Marie Adélaïde was one of only two persons Louis XIV had ever truly loved in his life, the other being Anne of Austria, the king's mother. After the Dauphine's death, the royal family moved to Marly to avoid the spread of infection. It was at Marly that the Dauphin himself died six days later, having caught the measles from his wife.

The couple was buried together at the Basilica of Saint Denis on 23 February 1712. Their son, the Duke of Brittany succeeded as Dauphin, but he died the following March from the measles. The only child to survive the epidemic was the future Louis XV who was locked inside his apartments with his governess Madame de Ventadour to avoid being bled to death by doctors like his elder brother had been. Madame de Ventadour was renowned for having saved the infant Louis XV's life. Louis XV subsequently named his fourth daughter Marie Adélaïde in his mother's honour.

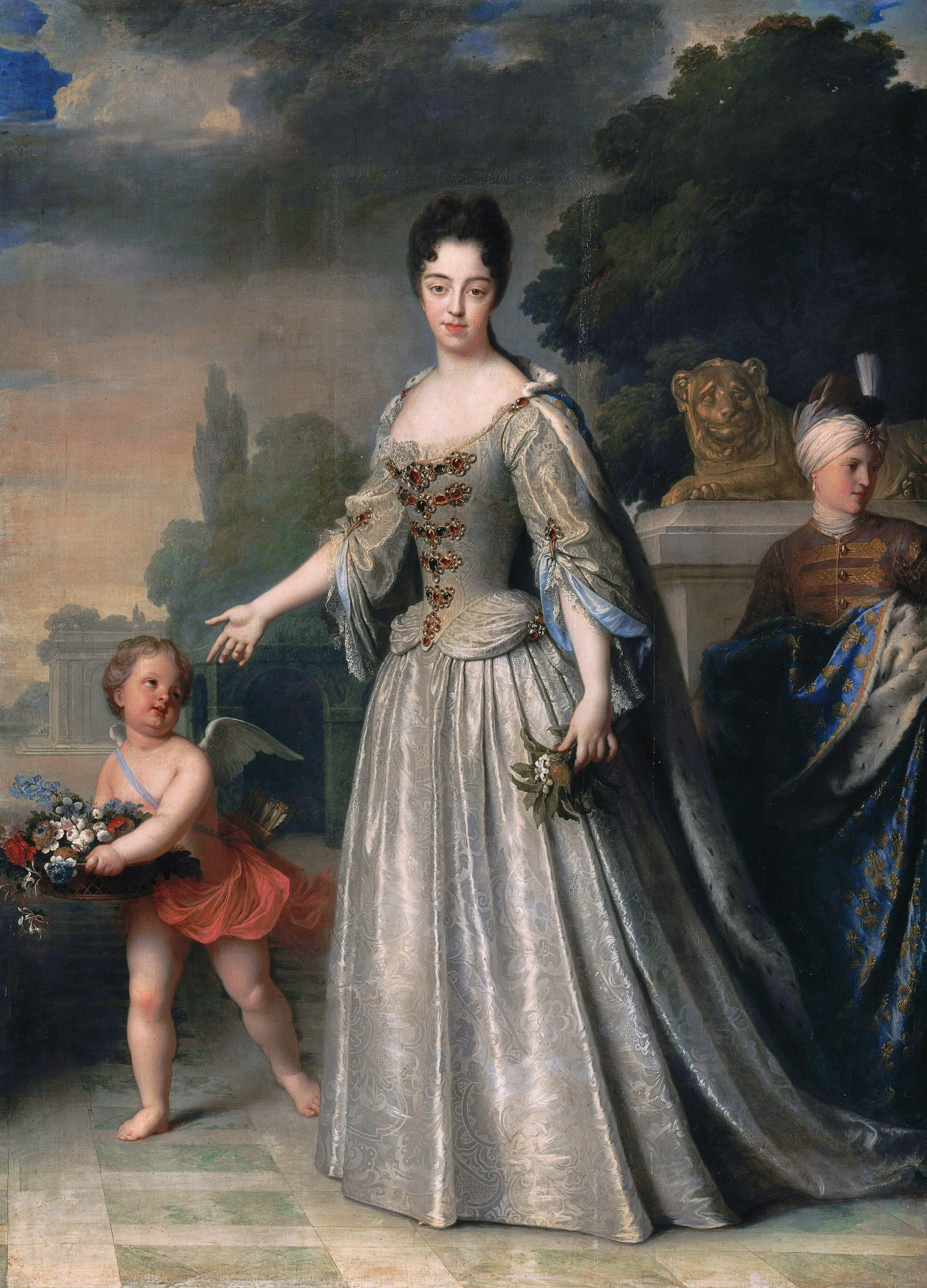
1709 portrait

The Dauphine was the subject of a statue held at the Louvre in which she posed as the Roman goddess Diana which was crafted by Antoine Coysevox in 1710.

== Issue ==
1. Louis of France, Duke of Brittany (25 June 1704 – 13 April 1705) died of convulsions;
2. Louis of France, Duke of Brittany then Dauphin of France (8 January 1707 – 8 March 1712) died of measles;
3. Louis of France, Duke of Anjou then Dauphin of France, future King Louis XV (15 February 1710 – 10 May 1774) first engaged to Mariana Victoria of Spain; married Marie Leszczyńska and had issue; died of smallpox.

== Ancestry ==
Ancestors of Marie Adélaïde of Savoy

8. Victor Amadeus I, Duke of Savoy
4. Charles Emmanuel II, Duke of Savoy
9. Christine of France
2. Victor Amadeus II of Sardinia
10. Charles Amadeus, Duke of Nemours
5. Marie Jeanne Baptiste of Savoy
11. Élisabeth de Bourbon
1. Marie Adélaïde of Savoy
12. Louis XIII of France
6. Philippe I, Duke of Orléans
13. Anne of Austria
3. Anne Marie d'Orléans
14. Charles I of England
7. Henrietta of England
15. Henrietta Maria of France

== Sources ==
- Lurgo, Elisabetta (2024). Marie-Adélaïde de Savoie, duchesse de Bourgogne, mère de Louis XV. Paris: Perrin. ISBN 978-2-262-10013-1.
- Fraser, Antonia (2006). Love and Louis XIV; The Women in the Life of the Sun King. London: Anchor Books. ISBN 0-7538-2293-8.
- Mitford, Nancy (1966). The Sun King. London: Penguin Publishing. ISBN 0-14-023967-7.
- Symcox, Geoffrey (1983). Victor Amadeus II: absolutism in the Savoyard State, 1675-1730. University of California Press. ISBN 978-0-520-04974-1.
- Williams, H. Noel (1909). A Rose of Savoy, Marie Adelaide of Savoy, duchesse de Bourgogne, Mother of Louis XV. New York: Charles Scribner's Sons.
