= Louis, Duke of Burgundy =

Heir apparent to the French throne (1682–1712)

Louis
- Dauphin of France; Duke of Burgundy
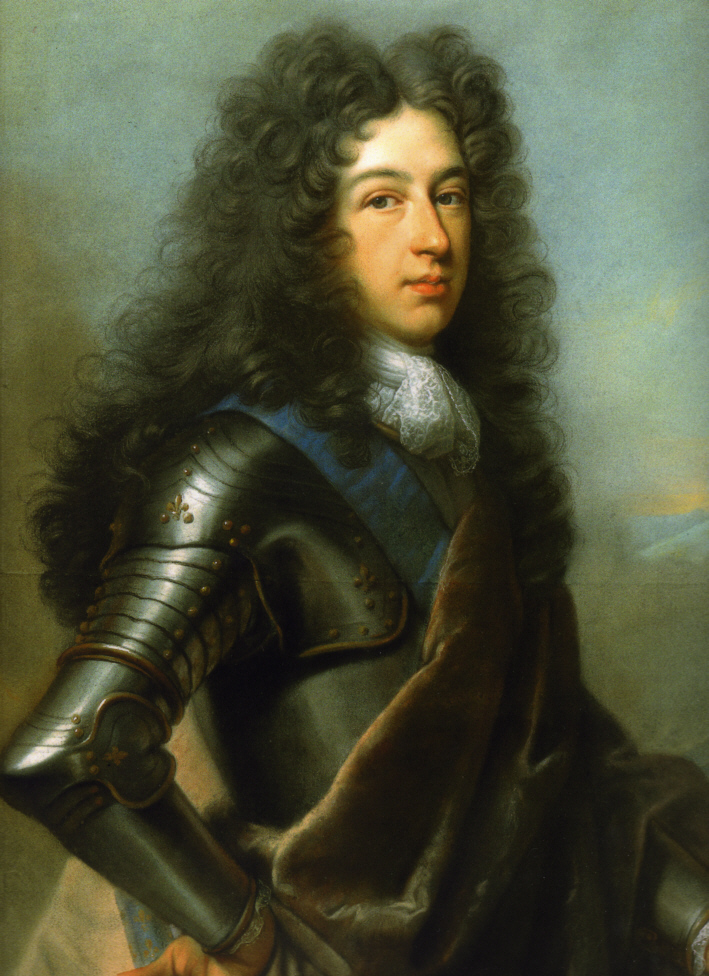
- Born: 16 August 1682; Palace of Versailles, France
- Died: 18 February 1712 (aged 29); Château de Marly, Marly, France
- Burial: 23 February 1712; Basilica of St Denis, France
- Spouse: Princess Marie Adélaïde of Savoy (m. 1697; died 1712)
- Issue: Louis, Duke of Brittany; Louis, Duke of Brittany; Louis XV
Names
- Louis de France
- House: Bourbon
- Father: Louis, Grand Dauphin
- Mother: Maria Anna Victoria of Bavaria
- Religion: Roman Catholicism
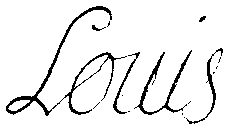
- Signature

Louis, Dauphin of France, Duke of Burgundy (16 August 1682 – 18 February 1712), was the eldest son of Louis, Grand Dauphin, and Maria Anna Victoria of Bavaria and grandson of the reigning French king, Louis XIV. He is commonly known as le Petit Dauphin to distinguish him from his father. When his father died in April 1711, the Duke of Burgundy became the official Dauphin of France. Described by his contemporaries as a pious, intellectual, gentle and shy man who was faithful and loving to his wife, he never reigned, as he died in 1712 while his grandfather was still on the throne. Upon the death of Louis XIV in 1715, the Duke of Burgundy's third son became Louis XV.

== Childhood ==
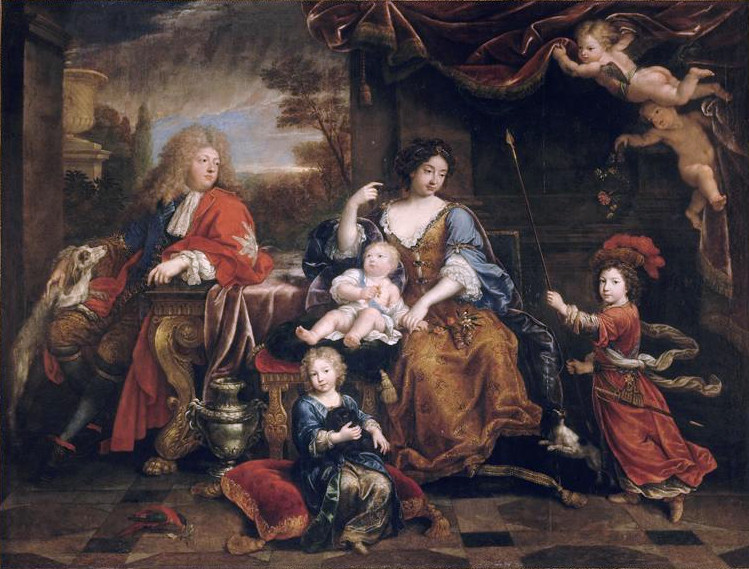
Louis, playing with a spear, with his parents and brothers in 1687

Louis was born in the Palace of Versailles in 1682, the eldest son of the French Dauphin, Louis, who would later be called le Grand Dauphin, and his wife, Maria Anna Victoria of Bavaria. His father was the eldest son of the reigning king, Louis XIV and his wife Queen Maria Theresa of Spain. At birth, he received the title of Duke of Burgundy (duc de Bourgogne). In addition, as the son of the Dauphin and grandson to the king, he was a fils de France and also second in the line of succession to his grandfather, Louis XIV, after his father.

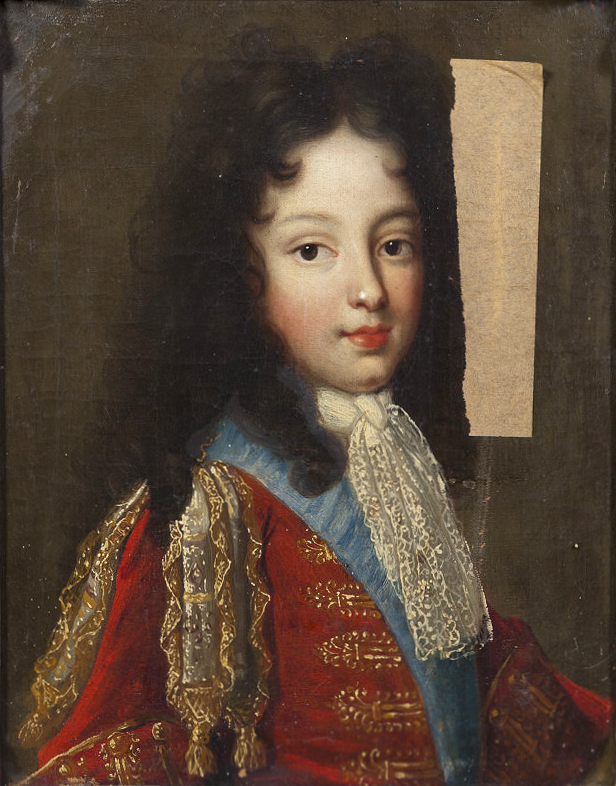
Louis c. 1690–95

Louis grew up with his younger brothers Philip, Duke of Anjou (who became King Philip V of Spain), and Charles, Duke of Berry, under the supervision of the royal governess Louise de Prie. He lost his mother when he was eight. His father, viewed as lazy and dull, never played a major role in politics.

== Marriage ==
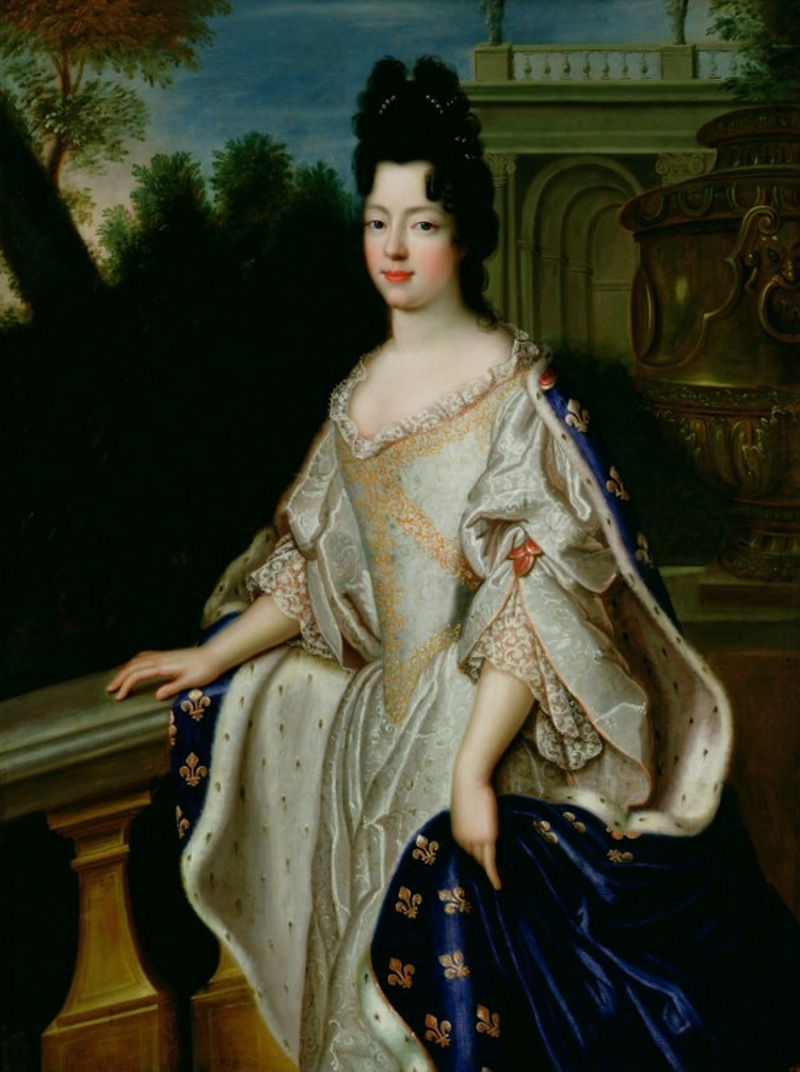
Louis's wife Marie Adélaïde, c. 1697

At the age of 15, he was married to his double second cousin, Princess Marie-Adélaïde of Savoy, the daughter of Victor Amadeus II, Duke of Savoy and Anne Marie d'Orléans. This match had been decided as part of the Treaty of Turin, which ended Franco-Savoyard conflicts during the Nine Years' War. The wedding took place on 7 December 1697 at the Palace of Versailles.

== Military career and politics ==
In 1702, at the age of 20, Louis was admitted by his grandfather King Louis XIV to the Conseil d'en haut (High Council), which was in charge of state secrets regarding religion, diplomacy and war. His father had been admitted only at the age of 30.

In 1708, during the War of the Spanish Succession, Louis was given command of the army in Flanders, with the experienced soldier Louis Joseph, Duke of Vendôme, serving under him. The uncertainty as to which of the two should truly command the army led to delays and the need to refer decisions to Louis XIV. Continued indecision led to French inactivity as messages travelled between the front and Versailles; the Allies were then able to take the initiative. The culmination of this was the Battle of Oudenarde, where Louis's mistaken choices and reluctance to support Vendôme led to a decisive defeat for the French. In the aftermath of the defeat, his hesitation to relieve the Siege of Lille led to the loss of the city and thereby allowed the Allies to make their first incursions onto French soil.

Louis was influenced by the dévots and was surrounded by a circle of people known as the faction de Bourgogne, notably including his old tutor François Fénelon, his old governor Paul de Beauvilliers, Duke of Saint-Aignan and his brother-in-law Charles Honoré d'Albert, Duke of Chevreuse, as well as the renowned memorialist, Louis de Rouvroy, Duke of Saint-Simon.

These high-ranking aristocrats sought a return to a monarchy less absolute and less centralised, with more powers granted to the individual provinces. Their view was that government should work through councils and intermediary organs between the king and the people. These intermediary councils were to be made up not by commoners from the bourgeoisie (like the ministers appointed by Louis XIV) but by aristocrats who perceived themselves as the representatives of the people and would assist the king in governance and the exercise of power. Had Louis succeeded to the throne, he might have applied this concept of monarchy.

== Death and legacy ==
Louis became Dauphin of France upon the death of his father in 1711. In February 1712, his wife contracted measles and died on February 12. Louis himself, who dearly loved his wife and who had stayed by her side throughout the fatal illness, caught the disease and died six days after her at the Château de Marly on 18 February, aged 29. Both of his sons also became infected. The elder, Louis, Duke of Brittany, the latest in a series of Dauphins, succumbed on 8 March, leaving his brother, the two-year-old Duke of Anjou, who was later to succeed to the throne as Louis XV.

As it was thought that the chances of survival of this frail child, now heir apparent to his 73-year-old great-grandfather, were minimal, a potential succession crisis loomed.

Moreover, overnight the broad hopes of the faction de Bourgogne were destroyed and its members would soon die natural deaths. Nonetheless, some of their ideas were put into practice when the Duke of Orléans, as regent during Louis XV's minority, created a form of government known as polysynody, in which each ministry was replaced by a council composed of aristocrats. However, the absenteeism, ineptitude and squabbling of the aristocrats caused this system to fail, and it was soon abandoned in 1718 in favour of a return to absolute monarchy.

== Issue ==
1. Louis, Duke of Brittany (25 June 1704 – 13 April 1705) died of convulsions;
2. Louis, Duke of Brittany (8 January 1707 – 8 March 1712) died of measles;
3. Louis XV, King of France (15 February 1710 – 10 May 1774) first engaged to Mariana Victoria of Spain; married Marie Leszczyńska and had issue; died of smallpox.

== Ancestry ==
Ancestors of Louis of France

8. Louis XIII of France
4. Louis XIV of France
9. Anne of Spain
2. Louis, Dauphin of France
10. Philip IV of Spain
5. Maria Theresa of Spain
11. Elisabeth of France
1. Louis de France, Le Petit Dauphin, Duke of Burgundy
12. Maximilian I, Elector of Bavaria
6. Ferdinand Maria, Elector of Bavaria
13. Maria Anna of Austria
3. Maria Anna Victoria of Bavaria
14. Victor Amadeus I, Duke of Savoy
7. Henriette Adelaide of Savoy
15. Christine of France

== Bibliography ==
- Erlanger, Philippe, Louis XIV, translated from the French by Stephen Cox, Praeger Publisher, New York & Washington, 1970. (First published in French by Fayard in 1965).
- Wolf, John B. Louis XIV (1968).
- Mansfield, Andrew, "The Burgundy Circle's plans to undermine Louis XIV's “absolute” state through polysynody and the high nobility", 'Intellectual History Review', Vol.27, Issue 2 (2017), pp. 223–45 - http://www.tandfonline.com/doi/abs/10.1080/17496977.2016.1156346

=== In French ===
- Achaintre, Nicolas Louis, Histoire généalogique et chronologique de la maison royale de Bourbon, Vol. 2, Publisher Mansut Fils, 4 Rue de l'École de Médecine, Paris, 1825.
- Antoine, Michel, Louis XV, Fayard, Paris, 1989 (French).
- Dufresne, Claude, les Orléans, CRITERION, Paris, 1991 (French).

Louis, Duke of Burgundy House of Bourbon Cadet branch of the Capetian dynasty Born: 16 August 1682 Died: 18 February 1712
French royalty
Preceded by Louis, le Grand Dauphin	Dauphin of France; 14 April 1711 – 18 February 1712	Succeeded by Louis
