= Château de la Paluelle =

Estate manor in Saint-James, Normandy, France

Coordinates: 48°31′32″N 1°18′54″W

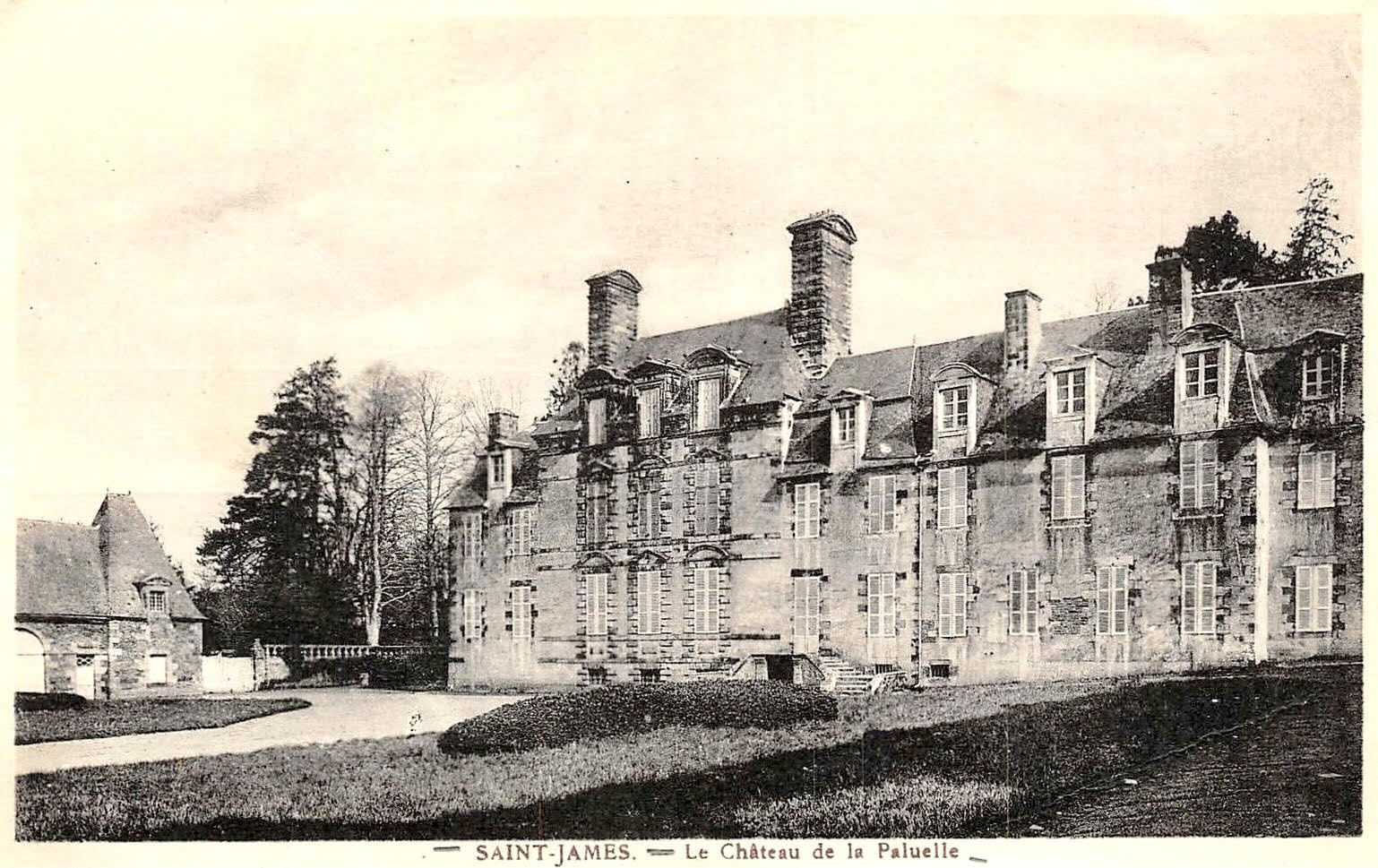
Chateau de la Paluelle at the turn of the 20th century

The Château de la Paluelle is a large estate manor located in the town of Saint-James, Normandy. Built as early as the 11th century during the reign of William the Conqueror, the chateau is a listed historical monument of the French Republic.

The Château de la Paluelle is privately owned and closed to the public. Its grounds are the site of the annual competitive-level horse jumping competition.

== History ==
While the date of the construction of the chateau has not been authenticated, it was in existence by 1389 and known as Le Manoir de Granges. Around 1530, it came into the possession of the La Paluelle family through a dowry, and the chateau has carried the family's moniker ever since.

During the latter half of the Hundred Years' War the immediate area saw heavy military activity between the opposing English and French forces. The siege of Saint-James took place between February 27 and March 6, 1426, resulting in English victory and during the chaotic retreat, hundreds of French soldiers drowned trying to cross the flooded Bouvron river valley below the chateau.

In 1638, the Chateau de la Paluelle was elevated to barony through the royal letters patent to Jean de La Paluelle.

During the French Revolution the area was the site of heavy clashes between the Republican forces and the Chouan rebels. The chateau's 17th-century chapel was destroyed during this period, and today only the foundation wall of the chapel remains.

=== Mathilde de Carbonnel-Canisy ===
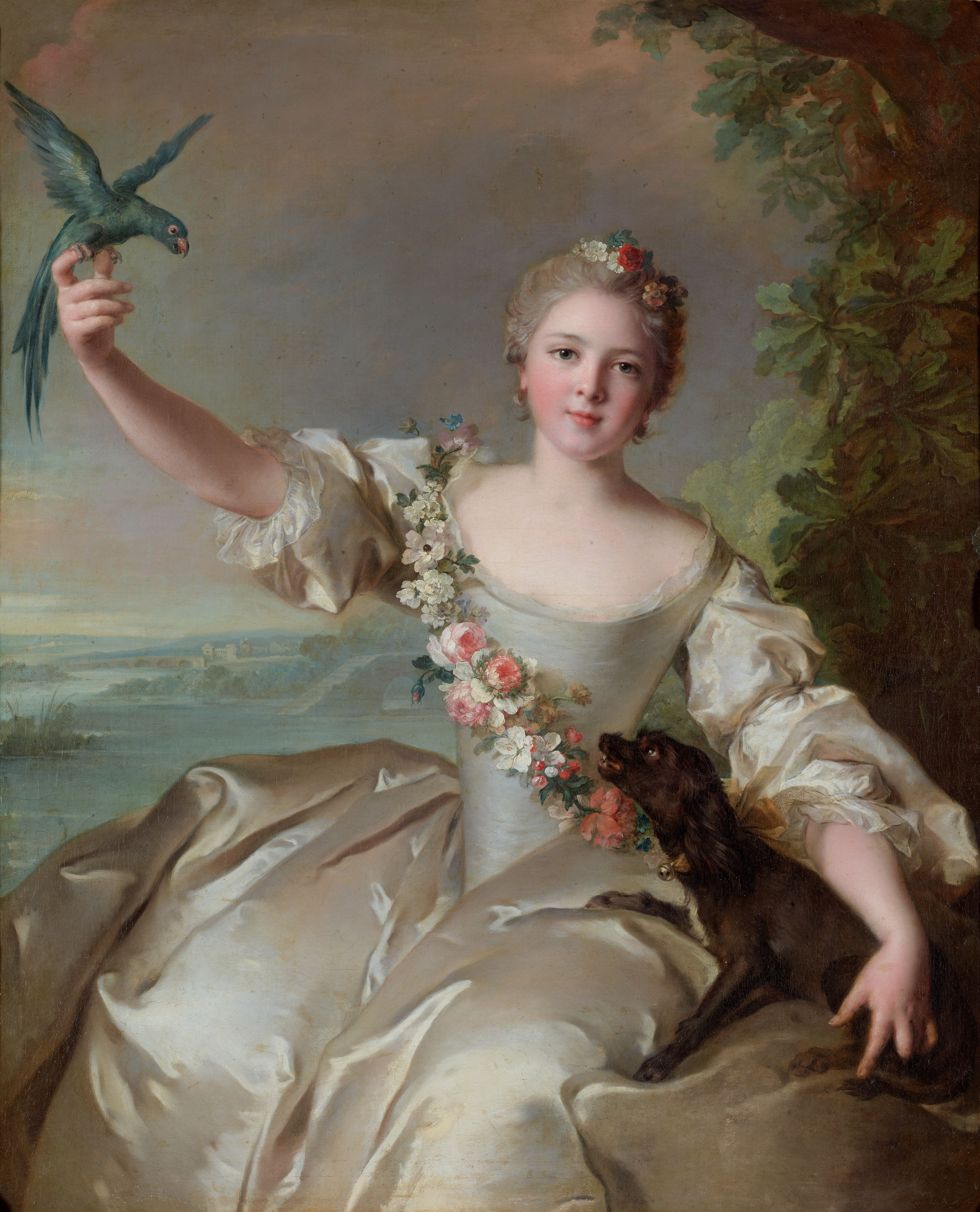
Jean-Marc Nattier’s 1738 portrait of Mathilde de Carbonnel-Canisy

Marie-François-Renée (known as Mathilde) de Carbonnel-Canisy was orphaned at an early age, and was raised by her paternal grandmother Charlotte de La Paluelle. Upon Charlotte's death in 1735, Mathilde inherited the Château de La Paluelle.

By 1742, through her husband's strong connections to Versailles, Mathilde entered the court of King Louis XV and maintained a short but well-documented affair with the king. She left the court in 1774, following a year in the service as the lady-in-waiting to Princess Maria Theresa of Savoy, wife of the future Charles X of France. During the French Revolution, Mathilde was detained between April and October of 1794, but survived and died two years later at the age of seventy-one.

Mathilde de Carbonnel-Canisy is famously depicted in a 1738 oil on canvas portrait by Jean-Marc Nattier, the official French court painter. The portrait is permanently exhibited at the Musée Jacquemart-André in Paris.

=== World War II ===
Following the Allied landing on D-Day, Saint-James was liberated on August 1, 1944. By August 4, General George S. Patton established the Third Army's field headquarters at the Chateau de la Paluelle. On August 6, the meeting of the Chiefs of Staff was held at the chateau. It was during this time that the strategy to repel the German counter-attack at Mortain was developed.

General Phillipe Leclerc's 2nd Armored Division was attached to General Patton’s Third Army, and set up the encampment on the chateau grounds as well.

== Description ==
The oldest part of the chateau, called the Petit chateau or Le Manoir, features the original round tower, windows and overhanging machicolations dating from the Louis XI era.

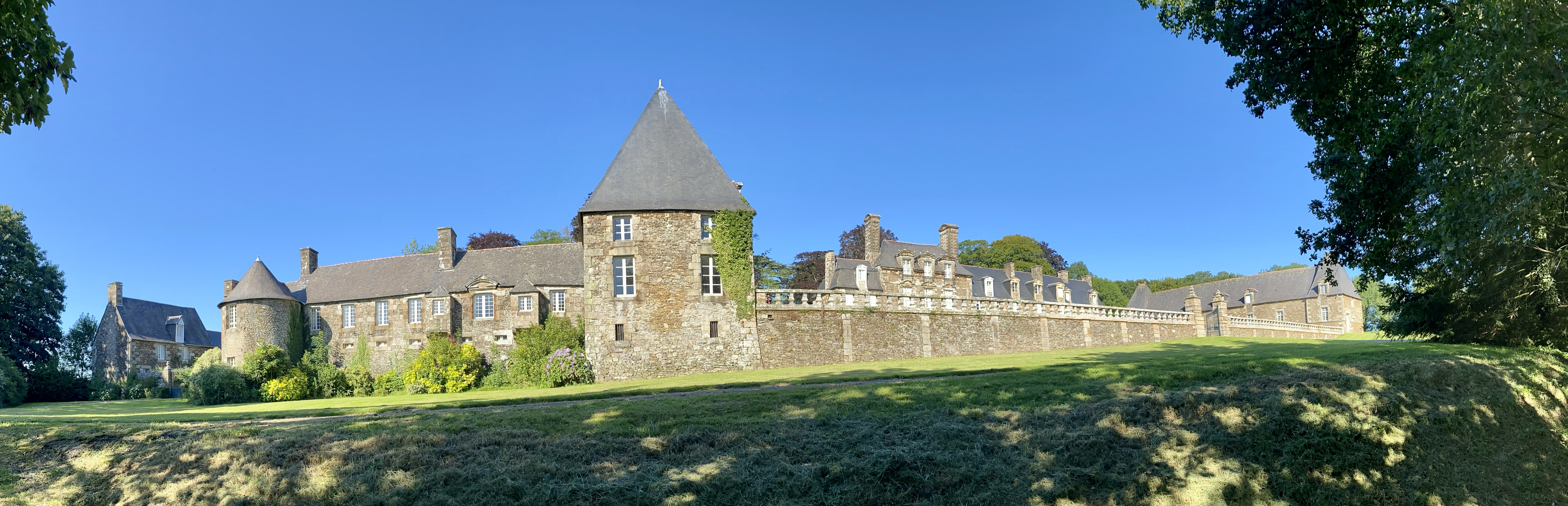
The oldest part of the Chateau de la Paluelle, known as Le Manoir, is to the left, while 17th-century additions are to the right

The main building, flanked by the stables and service buildings, was completed in its current form between 1615 and 1635, and the mansard roofs were added sometime after 1650. Interestingly, the structure retains a fully preserved and functional 17th-century kitchen. The front courtyard is enclosed by granite balustrade with pilasters locally known as "abbot's calves". Behind the chateau, a park features a large fountain and the double spiral staircase covering a 16th-century grotto.

The facades and roofs of the chateau and its outbuildings, the main courtyard terrace, and its park (ie A 1232 to 1234) are listed as historical monuments of the French Republic by the decree of January 30, 1967.
