= Bouglé =

Bouglé is a French surname. Notable people with the surname include:

- Célestin Bouglé (1870–1940), French philosopher
- Marie-Louise Bouglé (1883–1936), French feminist, librarian, and archivist
