= Montanel =

- Part of Saint-James
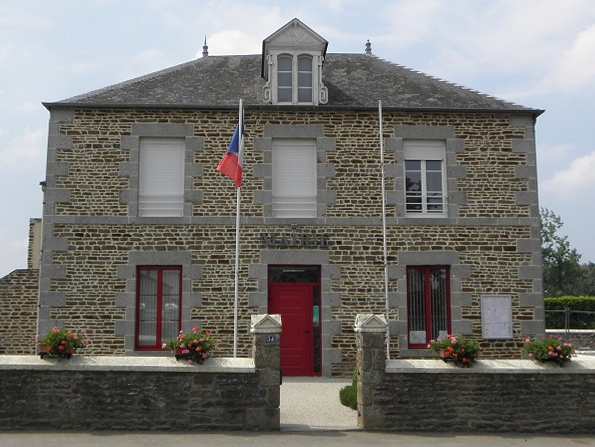
- Town hall
- Location of Montanel
- Location within France Location within Normandy
- Coordinates: 48°29′47″N 1°25′08″W
- Country: France
- Region: Normandy
- Department: Manche
- Arrondissement: Avranches
- Canton: Saint-Hilaire-du-Harcouët
- Commune: Saint-James
- Area^{1}: 15.40 km^{2} (5.95 sq mi)
- Elevation: 45 m (148 ft)
- Highest elevation: 124 m (407 ft)
- Lowest elevation: 19 m (62 ft)
- Population (2022): 371
  - Density: 24.1/km^{2} (62.4/sq mi)
- Time zone: UTC+01:00 (CET)
  - Summer (DST): UTC+02:00 (CEST)
- Postal code: 50240
- ^{1} French Land Register data, which excludes lakes, ponds, glaciers > 1 km^{2} (0.386 sq mi or 247 acres) and river estuaries.

Montanel (French pronunciation: [mɔ̃tanɛl]) is a former commune in the Manche department in Normandy in north-western France. On 1 January 2017, it was merged into the commune Saint-James.

== See also ==
- Communes of the Manche department
