= Saint-James =

- Commune
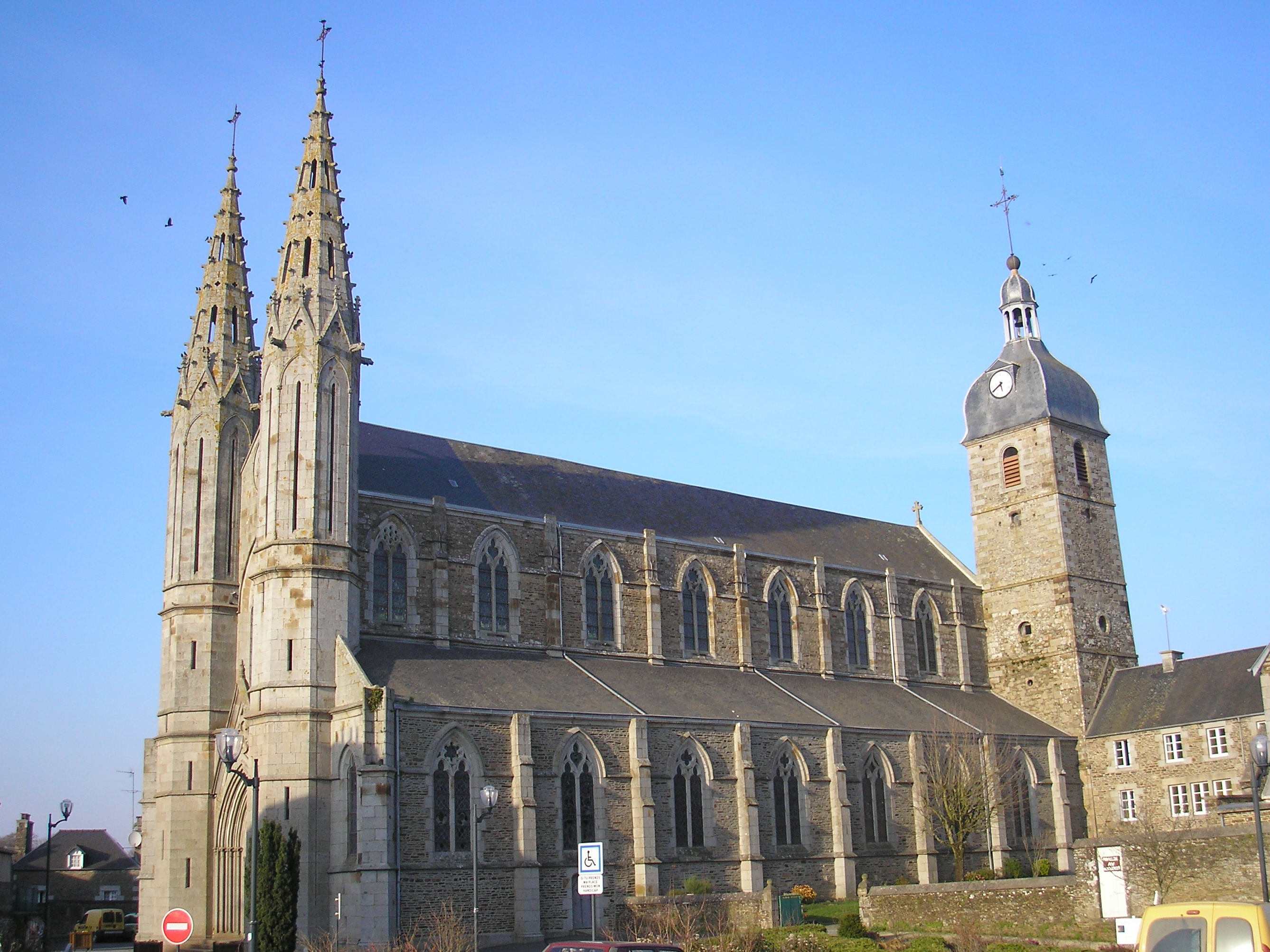
- The church of Saint-Jacques
- Location of Saint-James
- Location within France Location within Normandy
- Coordinates: 48°31′25″N 1°19′24″W
- Country: France
- Region: Normandy
- Department: Manche
- Arrondissement: Avranches
- Canton: Saint-Hilaire-du-Harcouët
- Intercommunality: CA Mont-Saint-Michel-Normandie

Government
  - Mayor (2020–2026): David Juquin
- Area^{1}: 86.41 km^{2} (33.36 sq mi)
- Elevation: 110 m (360 ft)
- Highest elevation: 151 m (495 ft)
- Lowest elevation: 28 m (92 ft)
- Population (2023): 5,018
  - Density: 58.07/km^{2} (150.4/sq mi)
- Time zone: UTC+01:00 (CET)
  - Summer (DST): UTC+02:00 (CEST)
- INSEE/Postal code: 50487 /50240
- ^{1} French Land Register data, which excludes lakes, ponds, glaciers > 1 km^{2} (0.386 sq mi or 247 acres) and river estuaries.

Saint-James (French pronunciation: [sɛ̃ʒɑm]) is a commune in the Manche department in Normandy in north-western France. On 1 January 2017, the former communes of Argouges, Carnet, La Croix-Avranchin, Montanel, Vergoncey and Villiers-le-Pré were merged into Saint-James.

== Geography ==
Saint-James is on the border between Normandy and Brittany. The rivers Beuvron and Dierge flow through the commune.

== History ==
William the Conqueror built the Saint-James fortress in 1067.

During the latter half of the Hundred Years' War the immediate area saw heavy military activity between the opposing English and French forces. The siege of Saint-James took place between February 27 and March 6, 1426, resulting in English victory.

During the French Revolution the area was the site of heavy clashes between the Republican forces and the Chouan rebels.

=== Heraldry ===
Arms of Saint-James	The arms of Saint-James are blazoned : Gules, a gate argent flanked by 2 towers the sinister one taller Or, all masoned sable, in chief 1 escallop and in base 3 escallops argent.

== Transport ==
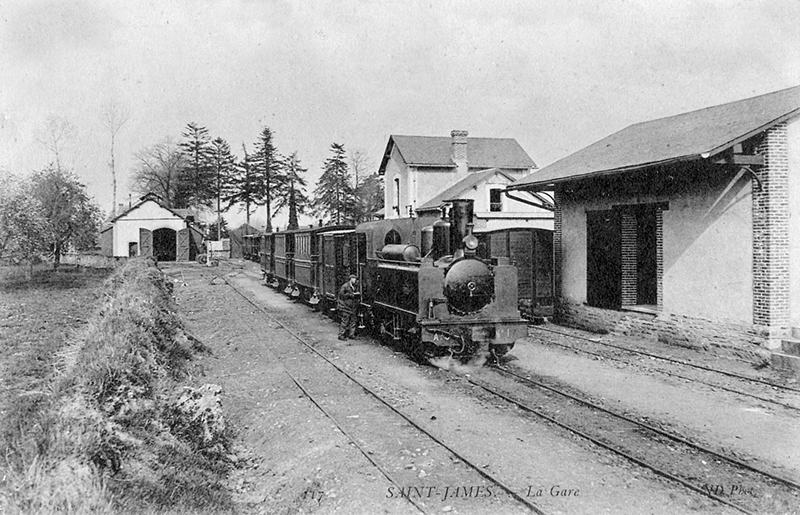
A steam train ready to depart Saint-James towards Avranches

From 29 July 1901 to 31 December 1933, Saint-James was connected via the 17 kilometres (11 miles) metre gauge Avranches–Saint-James tramway to Avranches, which operated three steam trains for mixed passenger and goods transport each day in both directions.

== International relations ==
Saint-James is twinned with:

- Erkelenz, Germany
- Beaminster, United Kingdom

== Demographics ==
Historical population
Year	Pop.	±% p.a.
1968	5,369	—
1975	5,154	−0.58%
1982	5,129	−0.07%
1990	5,258	+0.31%
1999	5,093	−0.35%
2007	5,002	−0.23%
2012	5,003	+0.00%
2017	4,954	−0.20%
2023	5,018	+0.21%
Source: Population in geography as of January 2025, INSEE

== Places of interest ==
- Brittany American Cemetery and Memorial
- Château de la Paluelle

== World War II ==
After the liberation of the area by Allied Forces on 4 August 1944, General George S. Patton established the Third Army's field headquarters at the Chateau de la Paluelle. On 6 August the meeting of the Chiefs of Staff was held at the chateau. It was during this time that the strategy to repel the German counter-attack at Mortain was developed.

Concurrently, engineers of the Ninth Air Force IX Engineering Command began construction of a combat Advanced Landing Ground outside of the town. Declared operational on 14 August, the airfield was designated as "A-29", it was used by the 373d Fighter Group which flew P-47 Thunderbolts until early September when the unit moved into Central France. Afterward, the airfield was closed.

== See also ==
- Communes of the Manche department
