= Vergoncey =

- Part of Saint-James
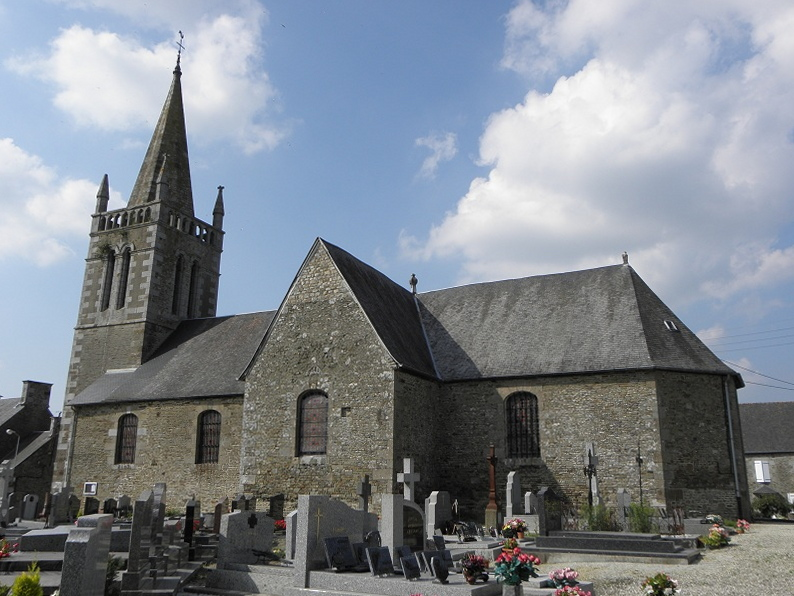
- Saint-Hilaire church
- Location of Vergoncey
- Location within France Location within Normandy
- Coordinates: 48°33′45″N 1°23′54″W
- Country: France
- Region: Normandy
- Department: Manche
- Arrondissement: Avranches
- Canton: Saint-Hilaire-du-Harcouët
- Commune: Saint-James
- Area^{1}: 7.73 km^{2} (2.98 sq mi)
- Elevation: 70 m (230 ft)
- Highest elevation: 87 m (285 ft)
- Lowest elevation: 16 m (52 ft)
- Population (2022): 184
  - Density: 23.8/km^{2} (61.7/sq mi)
- Time zone: UTC+01:00 (CET)
  - Summer (DST): UTC+02:00 (CEST)
- Postal code: 50240
- ^{1} French Land Register data, which excludes lakes, ponds, glaciers > 1 km^{2} (0.386 sq mi or 247 acres) and river estuaries.

Vergoncey (French pronunciation: [vɛʁɡɔ̃sɛ]) is a former commune in the Manche department in Normandy in north-western France. On 1 January 2017, it was merged into the commune Saint-James.

== See also ==
- Communes of the Manche department
