= Villiers-le-Pré =

- Part of Saint-James
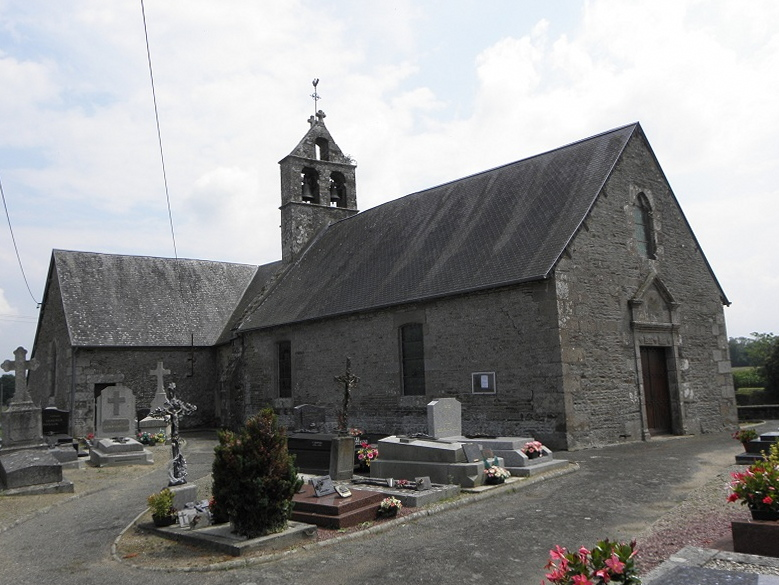
- The parish church of Saint-Pierre
- Location of Villiers-le-Pré
- Location within France Location within Normandy
- Coordinates: 48°32′35″N 1°23′52″W
- Country: France
- Region: Normandy
- Department: Manche
- Arrondissement: Avranches
- Canton: Saint-Hilaire-du-Harcouët
- Commune: Saint-James
- Area^{1}: 7.94 km^{2} (3.07 sq mi)
- Elevation: 60 m (200 ft)
- Highest elevation: 92 m (302 ft)
- Lowest elevation: 48 m (157 ft)
- Population (2022): 205
  - Density: 25.8/km^{2} (66.9/sq mi)
- Time zone: UTC+01:00 (CET)
  - Summer (DST): UTC+02:00 (CEST)
- Postal code: 50240
- ^{1} French Land Register data, which excludes lakes, ponds, glaciers > 1 km^{2} (0.386 sq mi or 247 acres) and river estuaries.

Villiers-le-Pré (French pronunciation: [vilje lə pʁe]) is a former commune in the Manche department in Normandy in north-western France. On 1 January 2017, it was merged into the commune Saint-James.

== See also ==
- Communes of the Manche department
