= Marie Courtois =

French artist (c. 1655–1703)

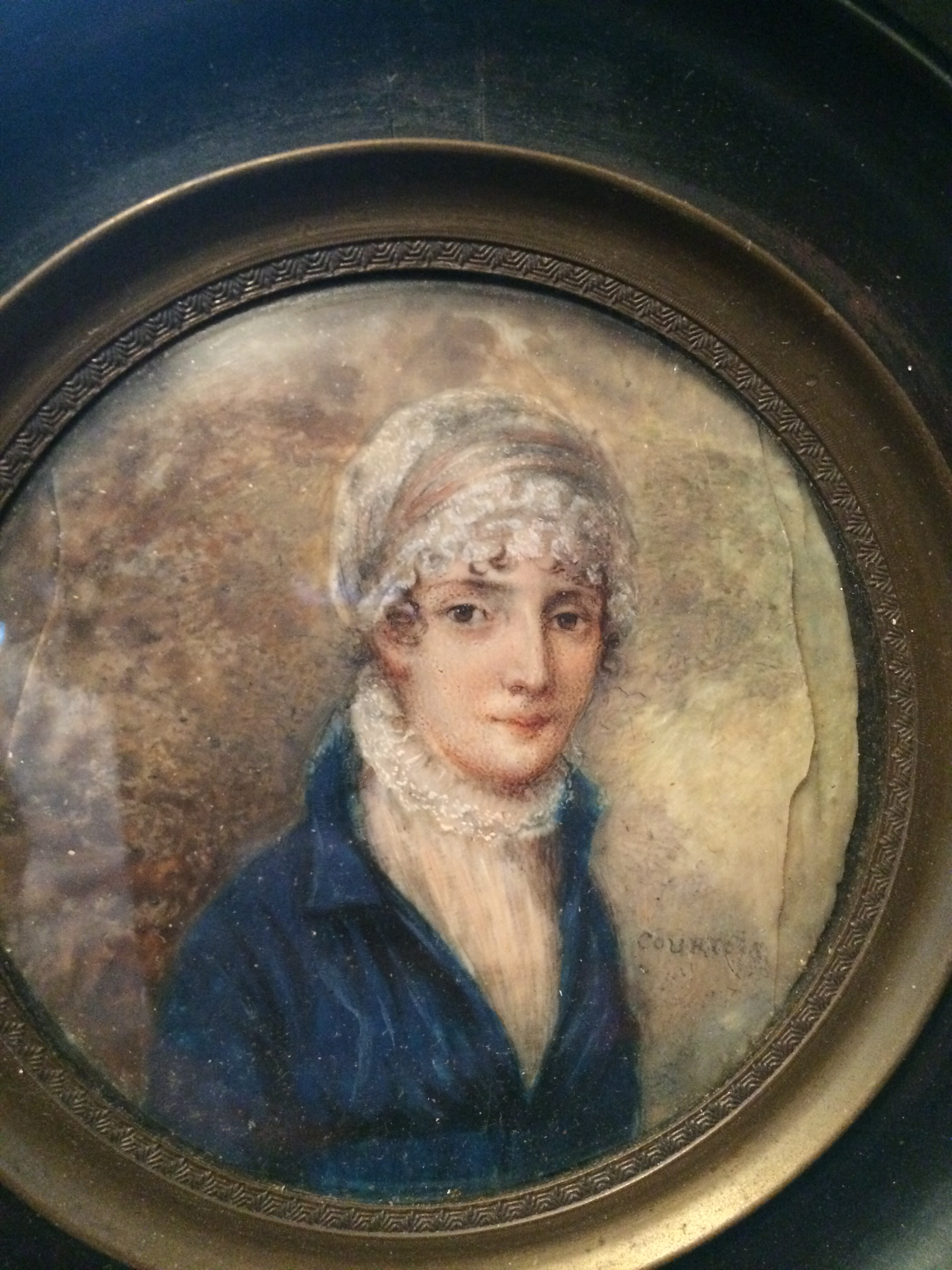
A minature portrait signed by "Courtois" on the bottom right

Marie Courtois (French pronunciation: [maʁi kuʁtwa]; c. 1655 – 13 October 1703) was a French miniature painter. She was a pupil of Le Brun. In 1675 she married Marc Nattier (1642–1705), a portrait painter. They were the parents of the more famous portrait painter Jean-Marc Nattier (1685–1766), their second son. She died in Paris in 1703.
