= Portrait of Mathilde de Canisy, Marquise d'Antin =

1738 painting by Jean-Marc Nattier

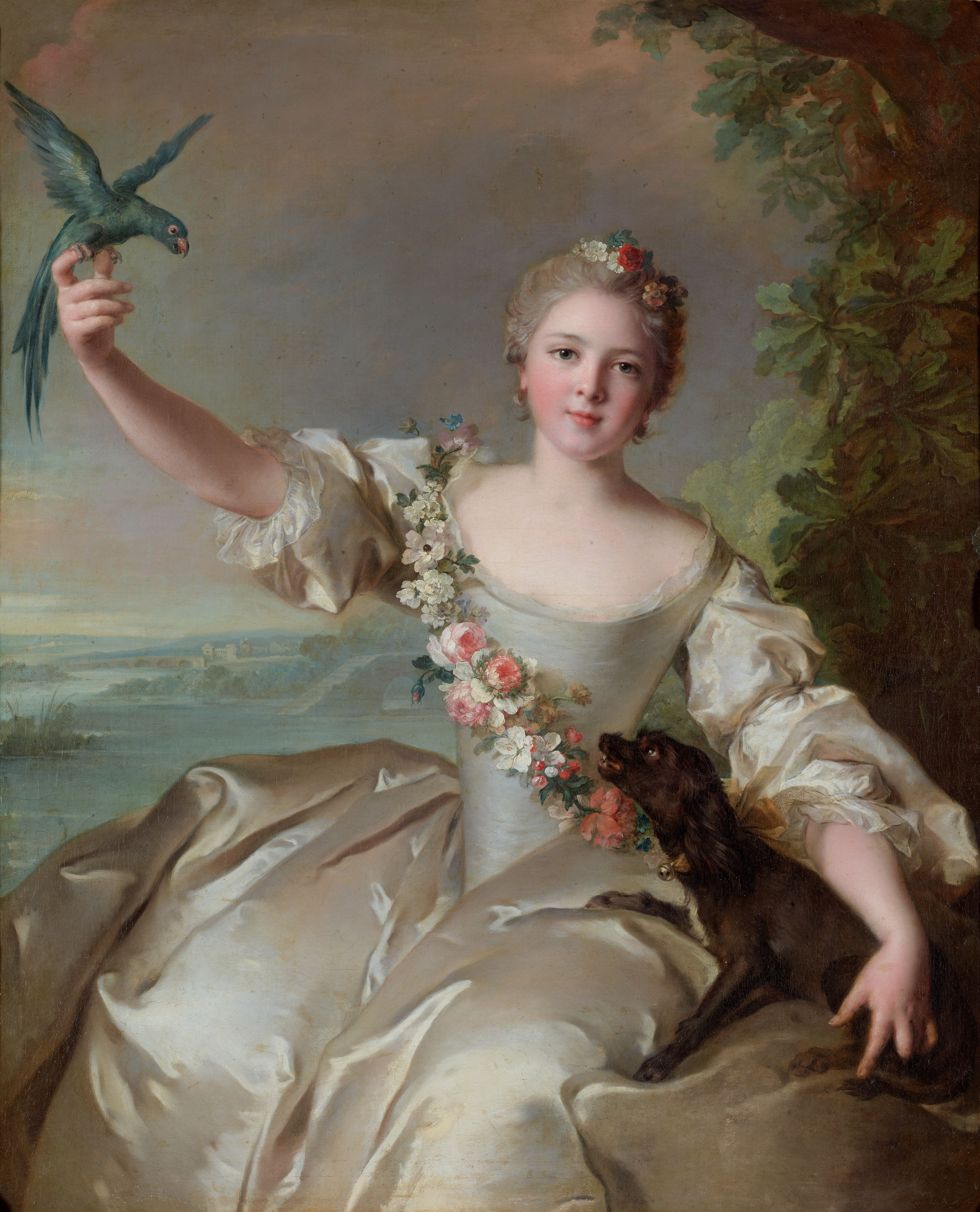
Portrait of Mathilde de Canisy, Marquise d'Antin (1738) by Jean-Marc Nattier

Portrait of Mathilde de Canisy, Marquise d'Antin is a 1738 oil-on-canvas portrait by Jean-Marc Nattier, produced ten years before he became official painter to the French royal family. It is now in the Musée Jacquemart-André, in Paris. It is said to be one of the most popular works in the Jacquemart-André Collection today, although it received little notice when first presented at the 1738 Salon.

Tha subject of the portrait is Marie-François-Renée (known as Mathilde) de Carbonnel-Canisy (1725-1796) at age 14. She was the only daughter of René-Anne de Carbonnel, comte de Canisy (1683-1728). She was orphaned at three years old, and was raised by her paternal grandmother Charlotte de La Paluelle. When she was 12, she was married to Antoine François de Pardaillan de Gondrin, marquis d'Antin. The painting is said to be an excellent example of Nattier’s work and sense of composition.
