= Argouges =

- Part of Saint-James
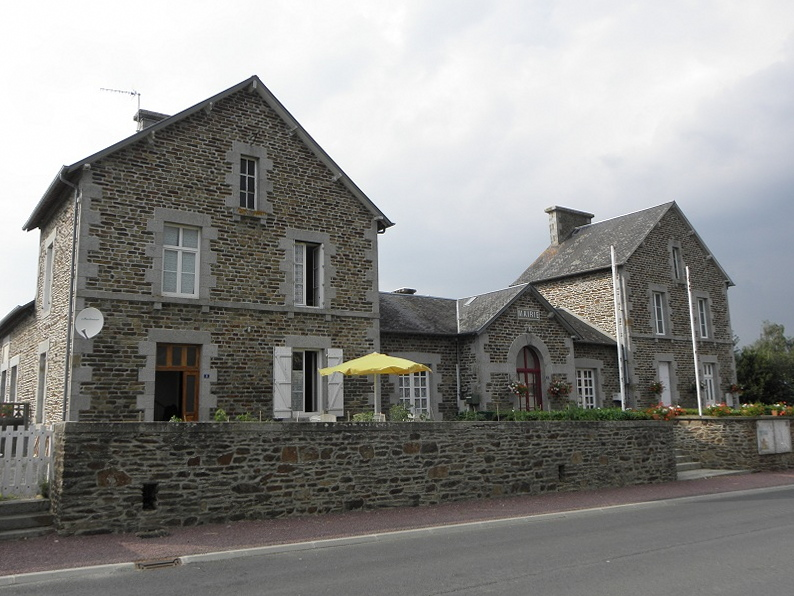
- The town hall
- Location of Argouges
- Location within France Location within Normandy
- Coordinates: 48°30′12″N 1°23′42″W
- Country: France
- Region: Normandy
- Department: Manche
- Arrondissement: Avranches
- Canton: Saint-Hilaire-du-Harcouët
- Commune: Saint-James
- Area^{1}: 16.41 km^{2} (6.34 sq mi)
- Elevation: 38 m (125 ft)
- Highest elevation: 133 m (436 ft)
- Lowest elevation: 25 m (82 ft)
- Population (2023): 519
  - Density: 31.6/km^{2} (81.9/sq mi)
- Time zone: UTC+01:00 (CET)
  - Summer (DST): UTC+02:00 (CEST)
- Postal code: 50240
- ^{1} French Land Register data, which excludes lakes, ponds, glaciers > 1 km^{2} (0.386 sq mi or 247 acres) and river estuaries.

Argouges (French pronunciation: [aʁɡuʒ]) is a former commune in the Manche department in the Normandy region in northwestern France. On 1 January 2017, it was merged into the commune Saint-James.

For many centuries the Barons de Gratot (Argouges) resided at the Château de Gratot in Argouges. Similar to the Château de Gratot is the Château de Argouges in Vaux-sur-Aure, in the French department of Calvados, Normandy which had also been owned by the Barons de Gratot (Argouges). According to the French Wikipedia a legend is that a Lord of Argouges met a Fairy woman who agreed to be his wife provided he never spoke the word "Mort" [death] which was considered profane language; however he spoke it and the Fairy vanished; this legend is associated with both Château de Gratot and the Château de Argouges.

Coat of arms of the Barons de Gratot (Argouges)

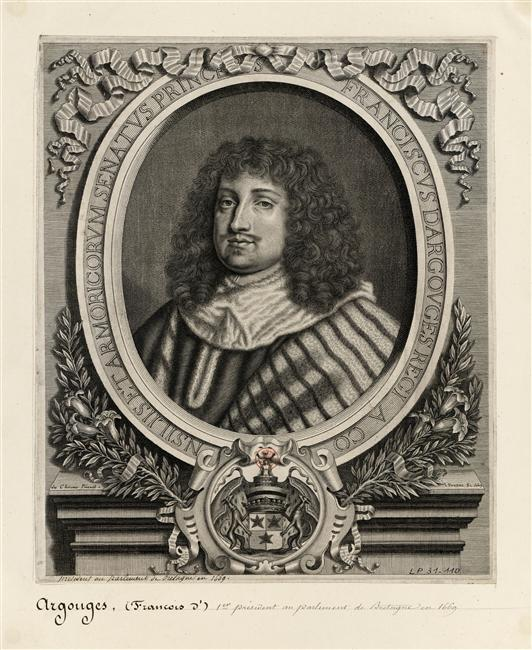
François d'Argouges, [1622-1695] premier président Parlement de Bretange

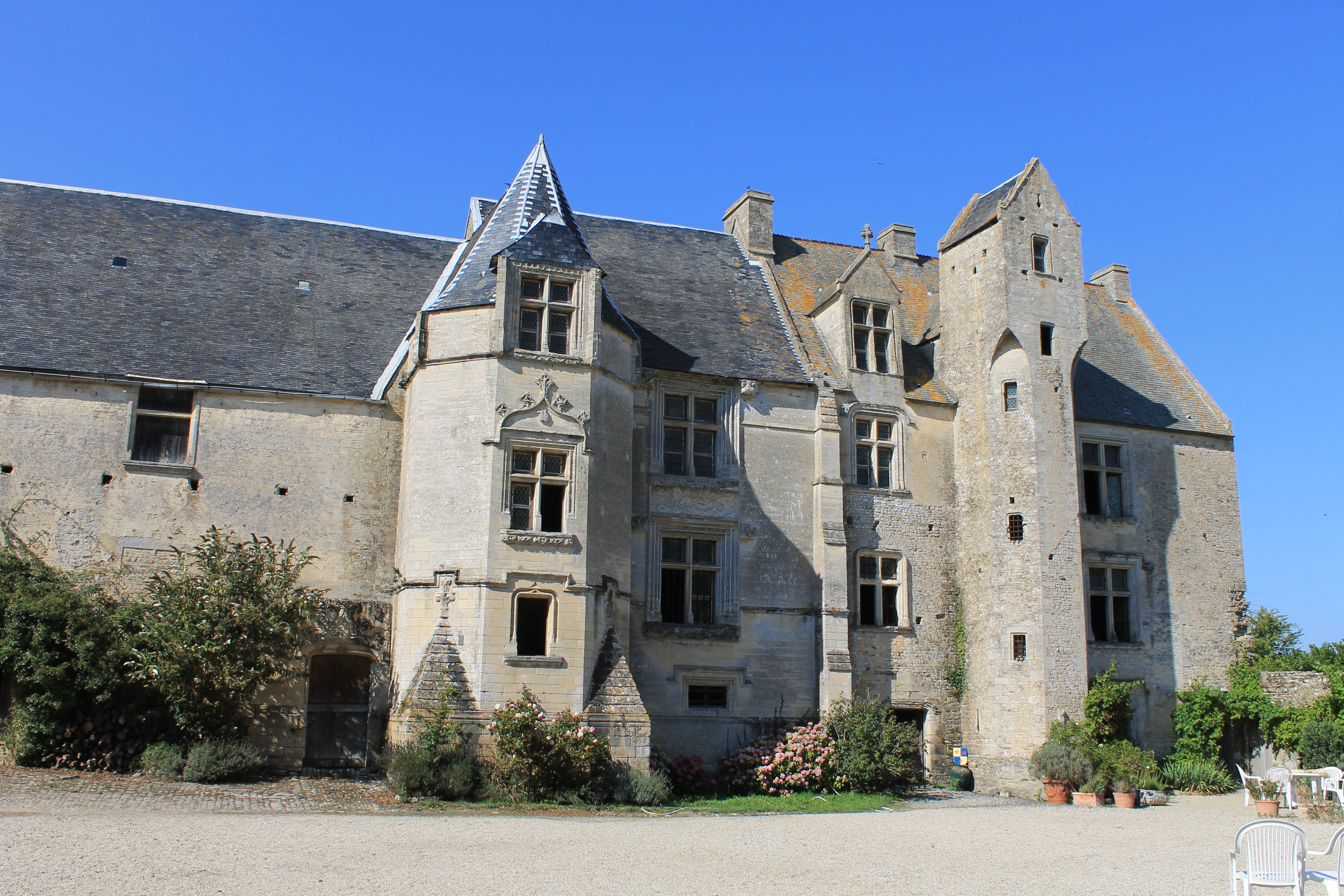
Château de Argouges in Vaux-sur-Aure.

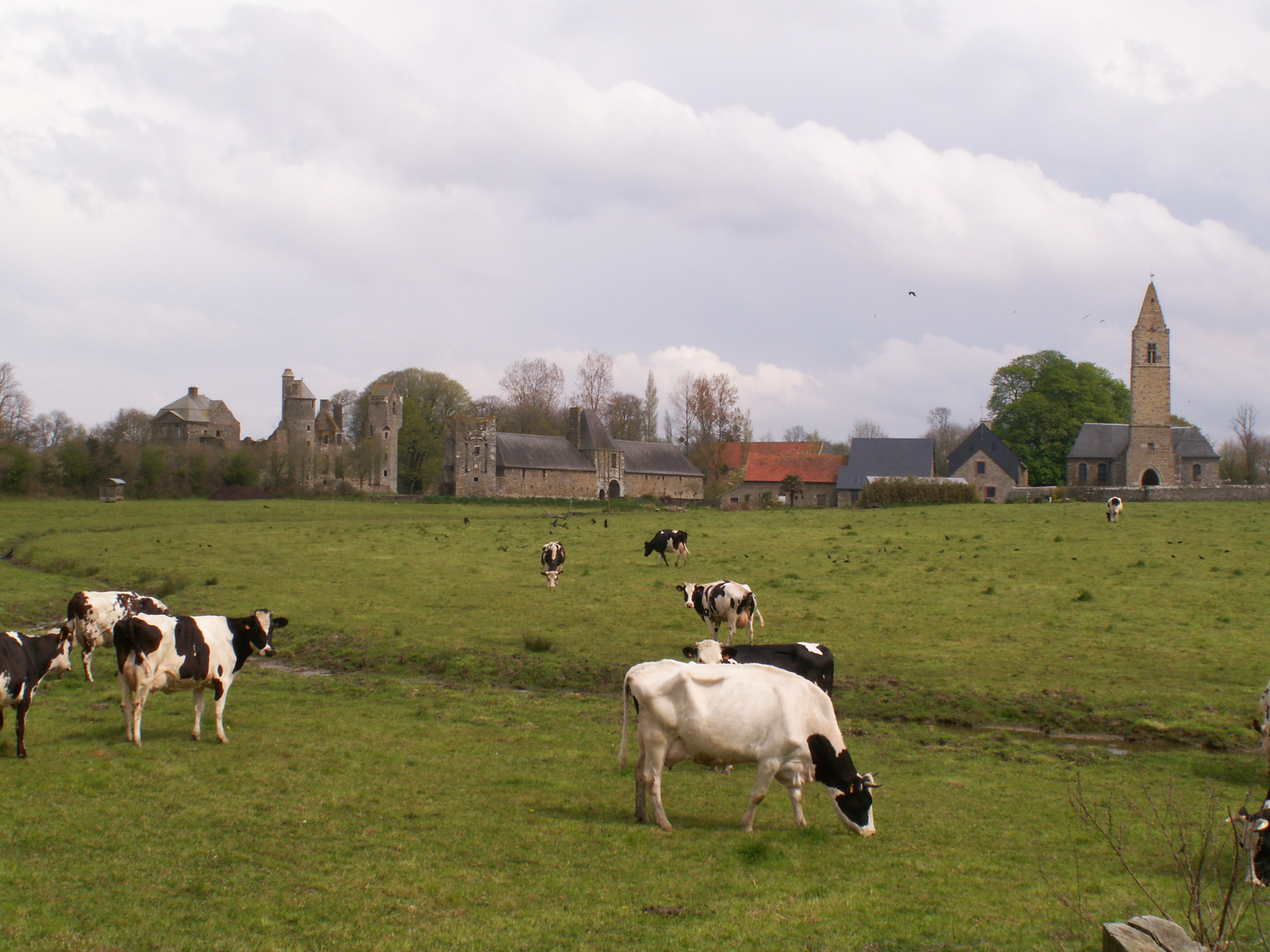
View of the ruins of the Château de Gratot at the left

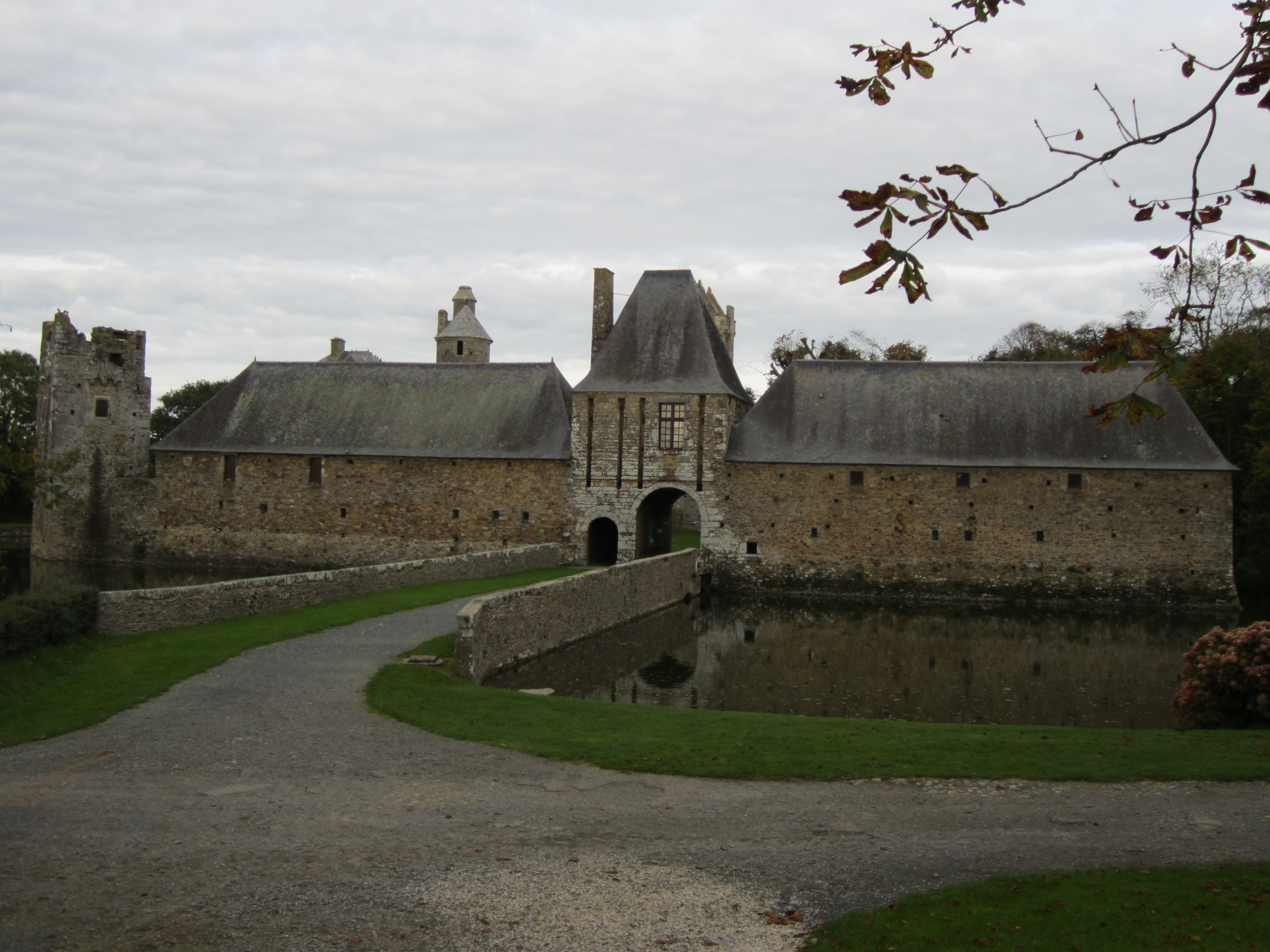
A view of the Main entrance of the Château de Gratot

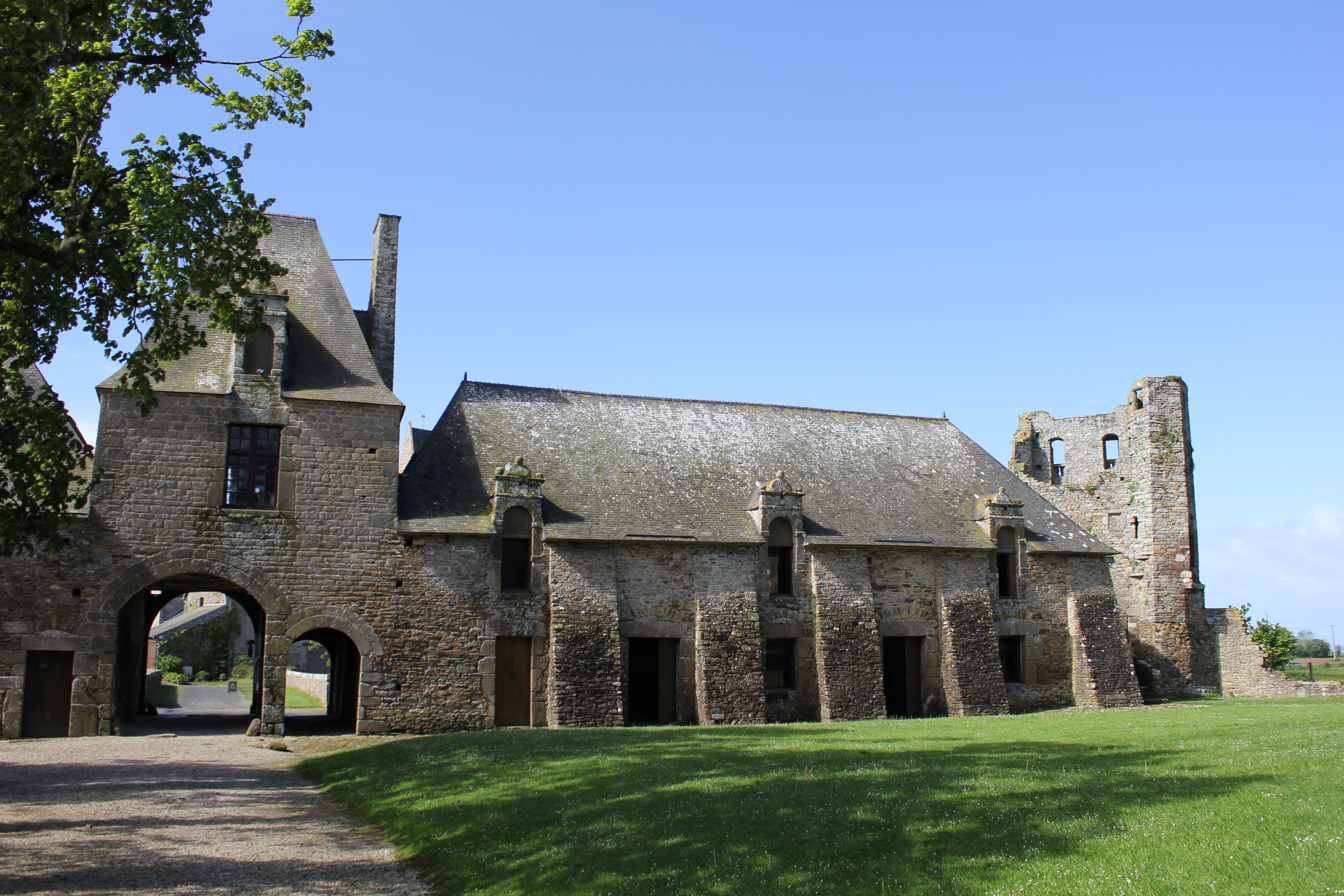
A rear view of the Main entrance of the Château de Gratot

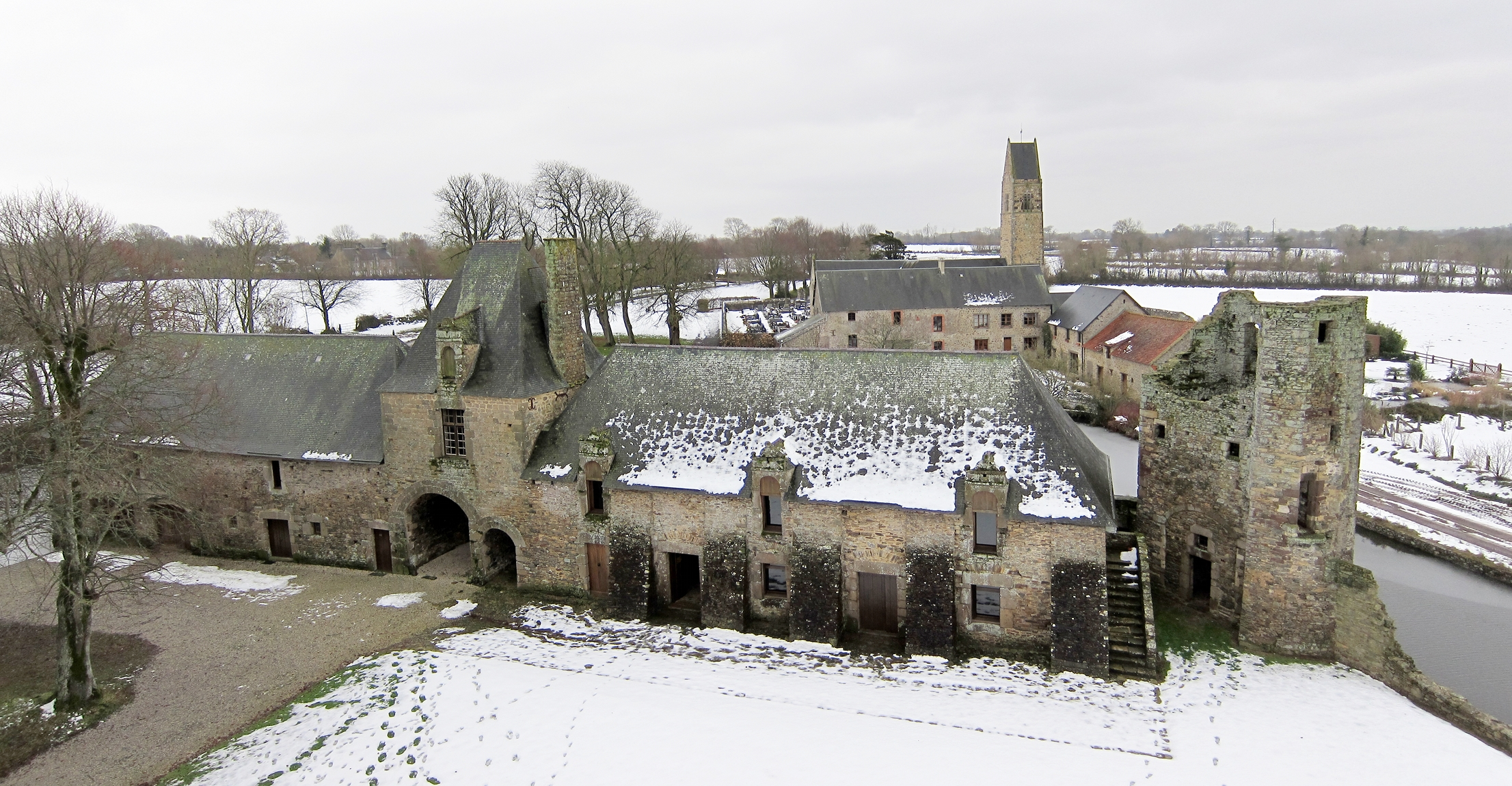
An overview rear view of Main entrance of the Château de Gratot

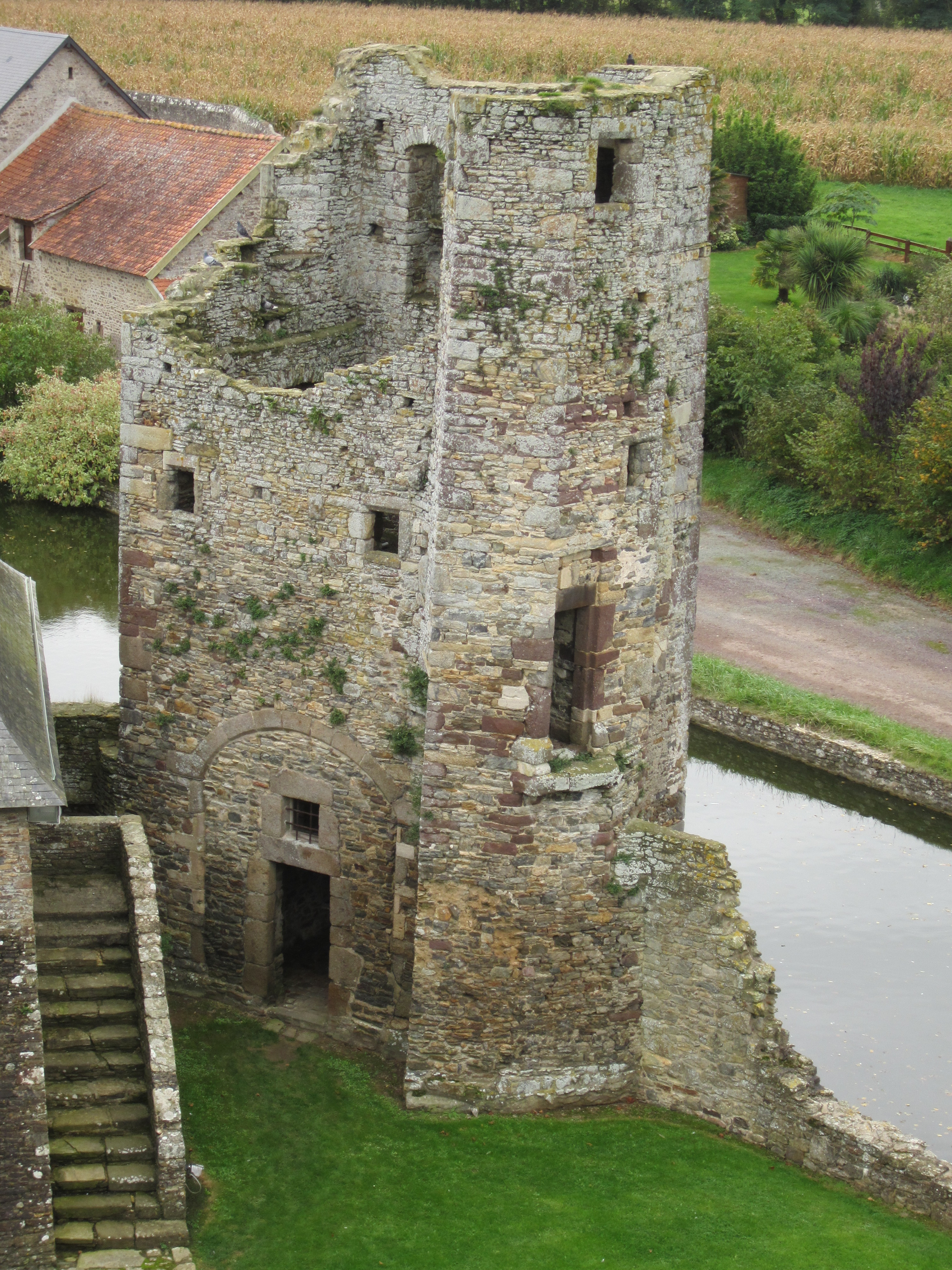
A rear view of Tower XIII of the Château de Gratot

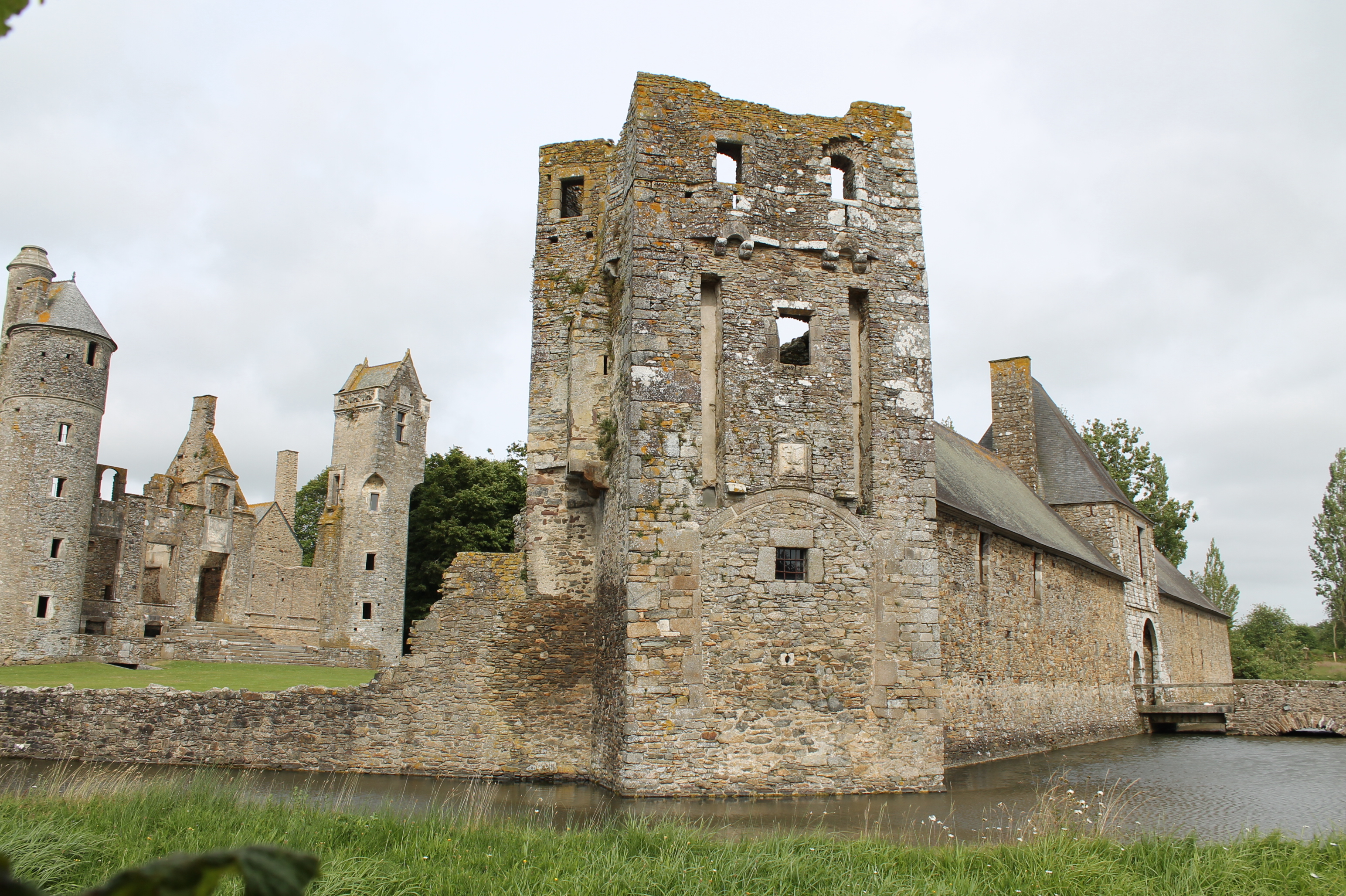
Tower XIII of the Château de Gratot

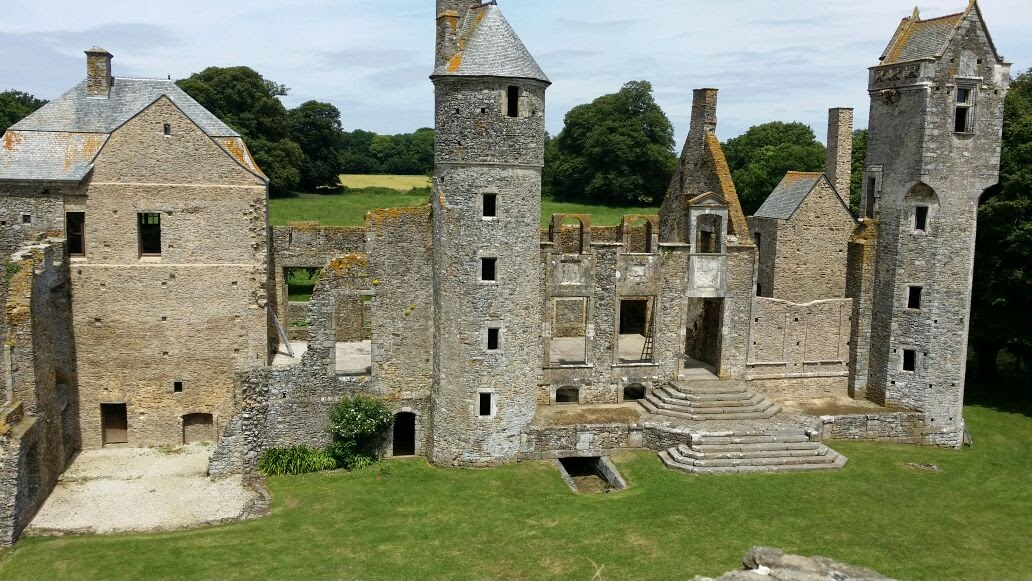
From left to right: The 18th Pavilion, the Round Tower, the Maison Seigneuriale, the Fairy Tower

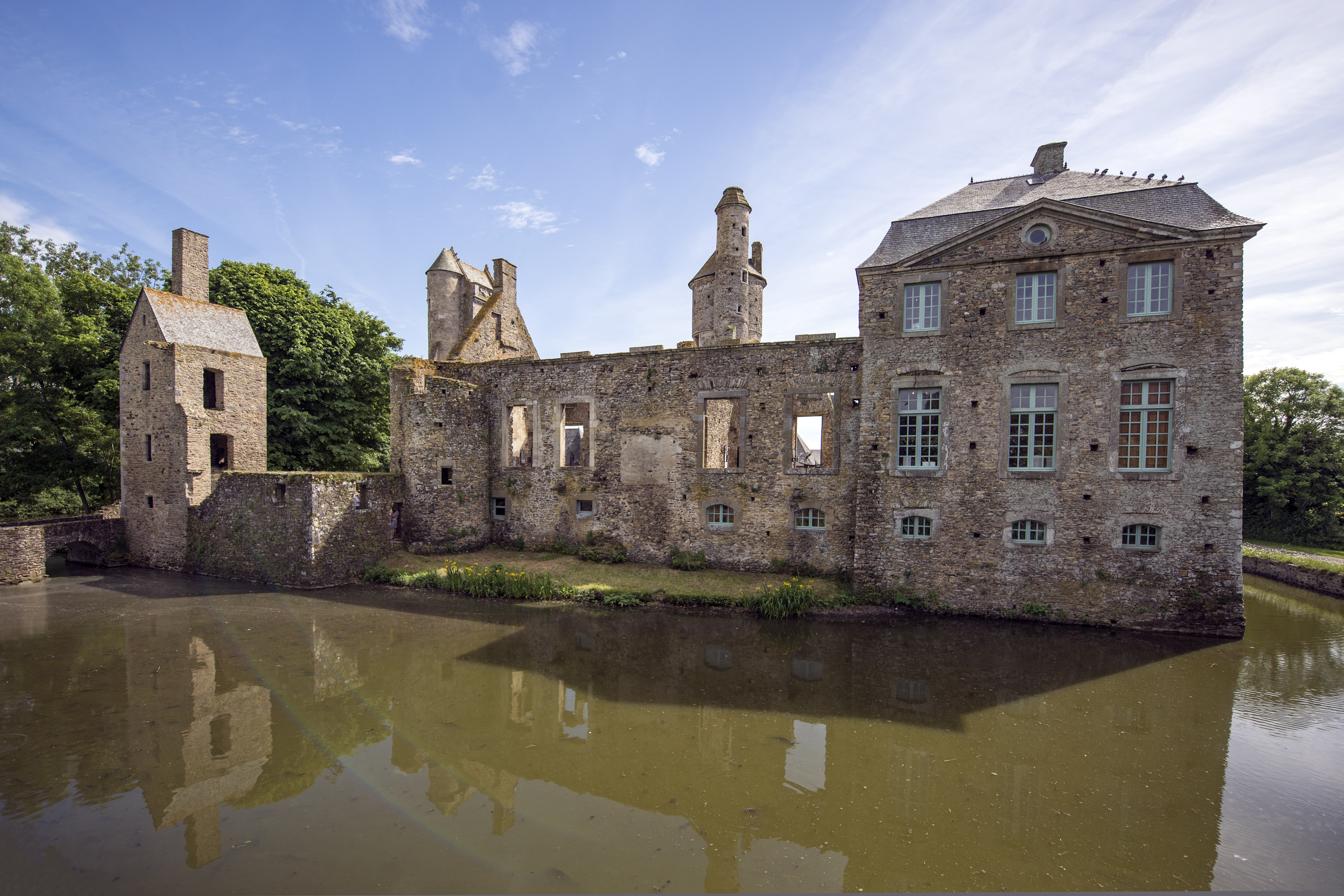
Rear View of the North facade of the Château de Gratot [The 18th Pavilion at the right]

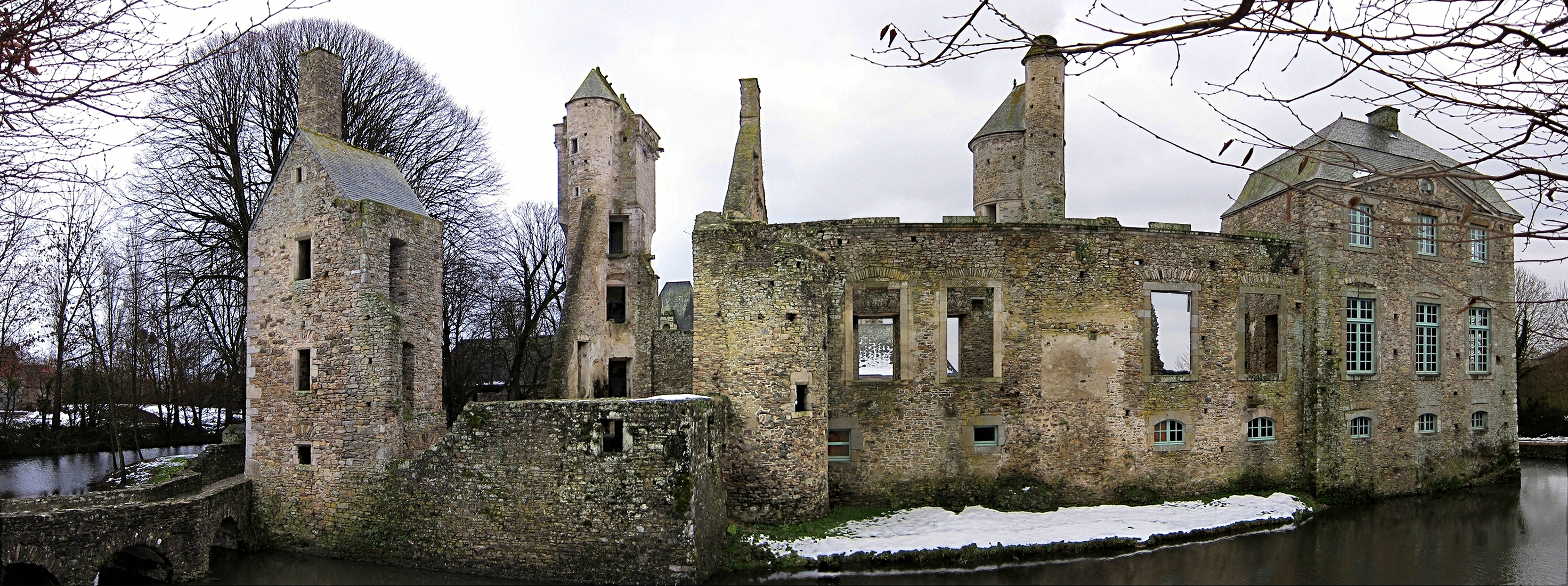
Rear View of the North facade of the Château de Gratot

== Notable people ==
- Marie-Louise Bouglé (1883-1936), feminist, librarian, and archivist

== See also ==
- Communes of the Manche department
