= Marie-Louise Bouglé =

French feminist (1883–1936)

- Born: Marie-Louise Françoise Bouglé; January 5, 1883; Argouges, France
- Died: June 13, 1936; Paris, France
- Occupation(s): Feminist, librarian, archivist
- Known for: Archives Marie-Louise Bouglé
- Spouse: André Mariani

Marie-Louise Bouglé (January 5, 1883 – June 13, 1936) was a French feminist, librarian, and archivist who founded a feminist library. The major themes of Archives Marie-Louise Bouglé are suffragism and pacifism. The collection is held by Bibliothèque historique de la ville de Paris.

== Early life ==
Marie-Louise Françoise Bouglé was born in Argouges on January 5, 1883. She was the youngest of a family of eleven children. Her father was a brickmaker.

Bouglé left school at the age of ten. Orphaned at the age of 11, she joined her sister in Paris. During the day, Bouglé worked as a saleswoman. In the evening, she learned shorthand, accounting, English, Spanish, and German. She also attended lectures at popular universities. She became a secretary-accountant and cashier in a restaurant in exchange for free meals.

== Career ==
In 1910, Bouglé attended a conference facilitated by Cécile Brunschvicg. Bouglé discovered feminist movements and joined the French Union for Women's Suffrage (UFSF). After World War I, she became aware of the importance of documenting, centralizing and collecting documents on feminist and pacifist movements. In 1921, Bouglé began to build a library at home. In 1923, the library consisted of 12,000 documents, and was opened to the public two evenings a week. She found the descendants of 19th century feminists. She contacts the heirs of Léon Richer and Caroline Kauffmann, obtaining bequests. She collected the personal correspondence and photos of her friends and colleagues, the manuscripts of their notes for unfinished biographies of famous women as well as their studies of women's working conditions. The reputation of the library grew. It made exchanges with other foreign feminist libraries.

After her marriage in 1933, Bouglé devoted herself entirely to her work as a librarian and archivist of feminist documents. She moved from her small room in the 10th arrondissement of Paris to settle herself and her library in the 13th arrondissement. Of her motive, Bouglé said:—

"The thought that all our efforts and ideas might be lost to the future worried me. I resolved to collect everything concerning present day women’s activities. From there to the past was an easy step. . . . Time pressed. Collections appeared each day and they had to be saved. I told myself that what I saved would (last forev- er). And then began the development of a pas- sion I didn’t know I had. The usefulness of my research, the growing interest in it, the success of my searches (for more books and papers), all con- tributed. At first, I planned only to save a few documents, but as days passed, I filled a room with books, pamphlets, newspapers, documents of all sorts, often rare and of great value and I found myself creating the vast library I had so yearned to have."

Bouglé rejected in principle the idea that her collection might be absorbed by that of Marguerite Durand because of ideological differences between the two women. After her premature death in 1936, the l'association des amis de la bibliothèque de Marie-Louise Bouglé (Association of friends of the library of Marie-Louise Bouglé) was formed, chaired by her husband, André Mariani and run by Henriette Sauret. The honorary presidency was bestowed on Cécile Brunschvicg.

== Archives Marie-Louise Bouglé ==
Bouglé's relatives tried to find a place to deposit the collection, but no library wanted it on the pretext that it was devoid of historical interest. In 1942, Mariani decided to bequeath the collection to the Bibliothèque nationale de France. In 1946, the collection was inherited by the Bibliothèque historique de la ville de Paris. Known as "Fonds Bouglé" in its early years, it was later renamed as "Archives Marie-Louise Bouglé".

The first inventory was made by Maïté Albistur and published in her 1982 thesis. In the present day, Bouglé's 6,686 works can be consulted at the library, and the archives of feminist personalities collected by Bouglé are gradually being described on the portal of the Bibliothèque historique de la ville de Paris. Two major themes characterize the Archives Marie-Louise Bouglé, suffragism and pacifism. The collection is also notable for the large number of images (photographs, posters, postcards) inserted in the files. These fonds and the Bibliothèque Marguerite Durand preserve essential archives of the history of the first wave of feminism in France.

== Death ==
Marie-Louise Bouglé died in Paris on June 13, 1936.
