= Jean-Marc Nattier =

French painter (1685–1766)

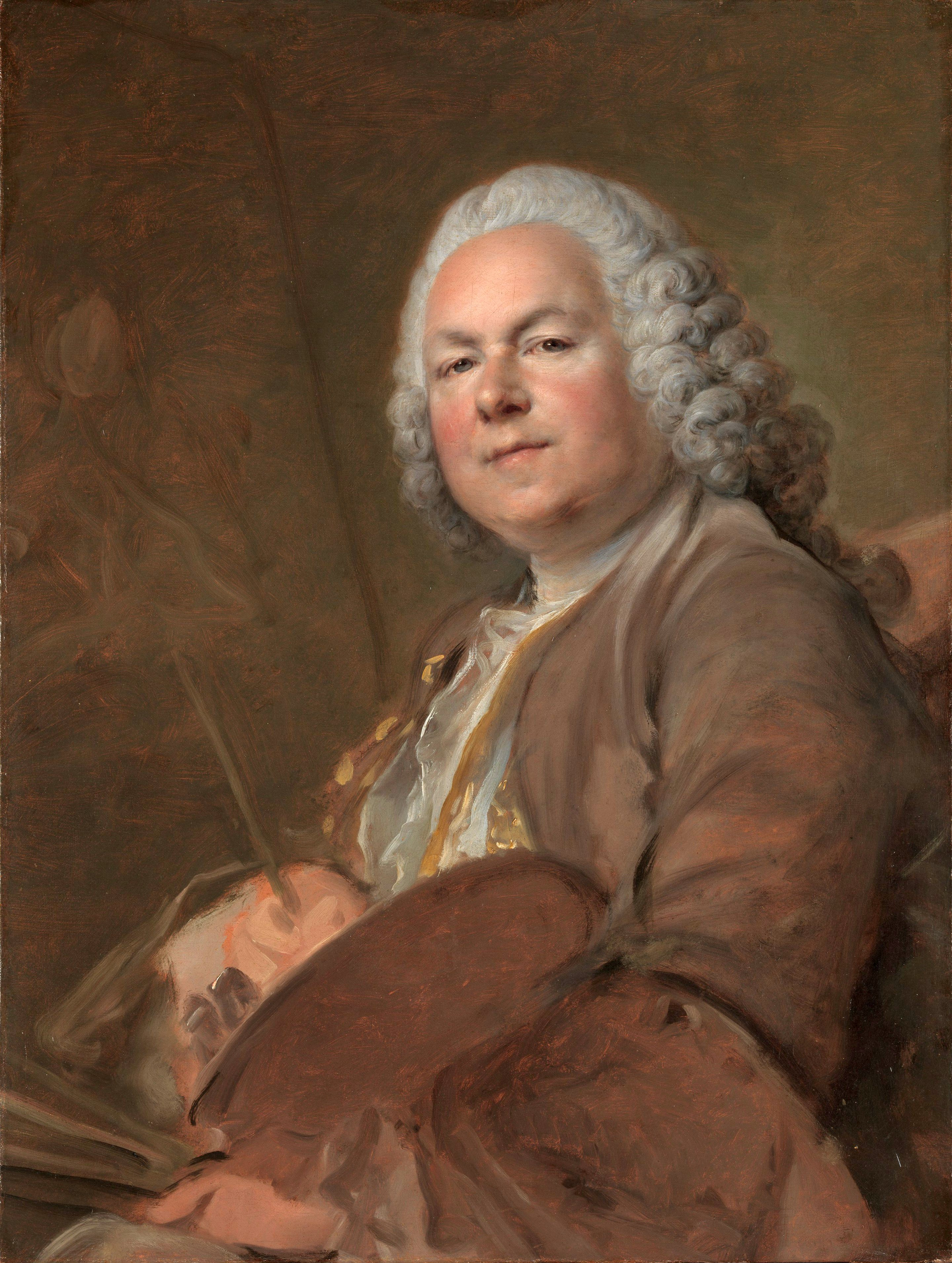
- Portrait by Louis Tocqué, late 1740s
- Born: Jean-Marc Nattier; 17 March 1685; Paris, France
- Died: 7 November 1766 (aged 81); Paris, France
- Known for: Painting
- Movement: Rococo

Jean-Marc Nattier (French pronunciation: [ʒɑ̃ maʁk natje]; 17 March 1685 – 7 November 1766) was a French painter. He was born in Paris, the second son of Marc Nattier (1642–1705), a portrait painter, and of Marie Courtois (1655–1703), a miniaturist. He is noted for his portraits of the ladies of Louis XV's court in classical mythological attire.

== Life ==
He received his first instruction from his father, and from his uncle, the history painter Jean Jouvenet (1644–1717). He enrolled in the Académie de peinture et de sculpture in 1703 and applied himself to copying pictures in the Luxembourg Palace, making a series of drawings of the Marie de' Medici cycle by Peter Paul Rubens. The publication (1710) of engravings based on these drawings made Nattier famous, but he declined to proceed to the French Academy in Rome, though he had taken the first prize at the Paris Academy at the age of fifteen. In 1715 he went to Amsterdam, where Peter the Great was then staying, and painted portraits of the Tsar and the Tsarina Catherine, but declined an offer to go to Russia.

Nattier aspired to be a history painter. Between 1715 and 1720 he devoted himself to compositions like the Battle of Lesnaya, which he painted for Peter the Great, and the Petrification of Phineus and of his Companions, which led to his election to the Academy. He died in Paris in 1766.

== Portraits ==
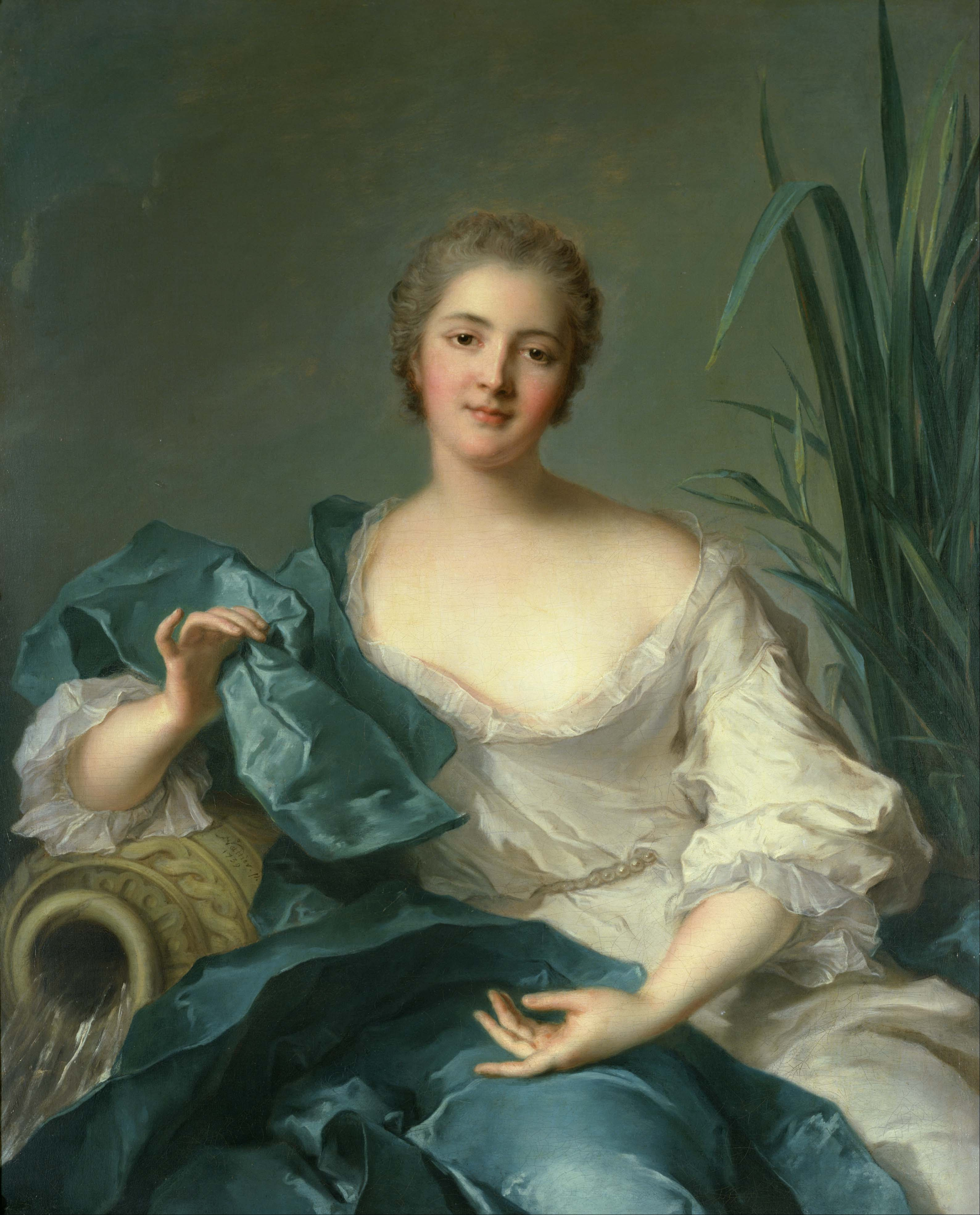
Portrait of Madame Marie-Henriette Berthelot de Pléneuf

The financial collapse of 1720 caused by the schemes of Law all but ruined Nattier, who found himself forced to devote his whole energy to portraiture, which was more lucrative. He became the painter of the artificial ladies of Louis XV's court. He subsequently revived the genre of the allegorical portrait, in which a living person is depicted as a Greco-Roman goddess or other mythological figure.

Nattier's graceful and charming portraits of court ladies in this mode were very fashionable, partly because he could beautify a sitter while also retaining her likeness. The most notable examples of his straightforward portraiture are the Marie Leszczyńska at the Musée des Beaux-Arts de Dijon, and the group portrait The Artist Surrounded by His Family, dated 1730. Another excellent example of Nattier's work and sense of composition is his 1738 portrait of Mathilde de Carbonnel-Canisy, marquise d'Antin. The portrait is permanently exhibited at the musée Jacquemart-André in Paris and remains one of the most popular works in the Jacquemart-André Collection.

Many of his notable paintings are on permanent exhibit at major museums. Thus at the Louvre is his Magdalen; in the Musee Jacquemart-Andre his Portrait of Mathilde de Canisy, marquise d'Antin; at Nantes the portrait of La Camargo and A Lady of the Court of Louis XV. At Orléans a Head of a Young Girl, at Marseilles a portrait of Madame de Pompadour, at Perpignan a portrait of Louis XV, and at Valenciennes a portrait of Le Duc de Boufflers. The Versailles Museum owns an important group of two ladies, and the Gemäldegalerie Alte Meister a portrait of the Maréchal de Saxe.

At the Wallace Collection Nattier is represented by The comtesse de Tillières (formerly known as Portrait of a Lady in Blue), Mademoiselle de Clermont en sultane, and The marquise de Belestat. In the early part of the 20th century in the collection of Mr Lionel Phillips were the duchess of Flavacourt as Le Silence, and the duchess of Châteauroux as Le Point du jour (now at Marseilles). A portrait of the Comtesse de Neubourg and her Daughter formed part of the Vaile Collection, and realized 4500 guineas at the sale of this collection in 1903. Nattier's works have been engraved by Alphonse Leroy, Tardieu, Jean Audran (1667–1756), Dupin and many other noted craftsmen.

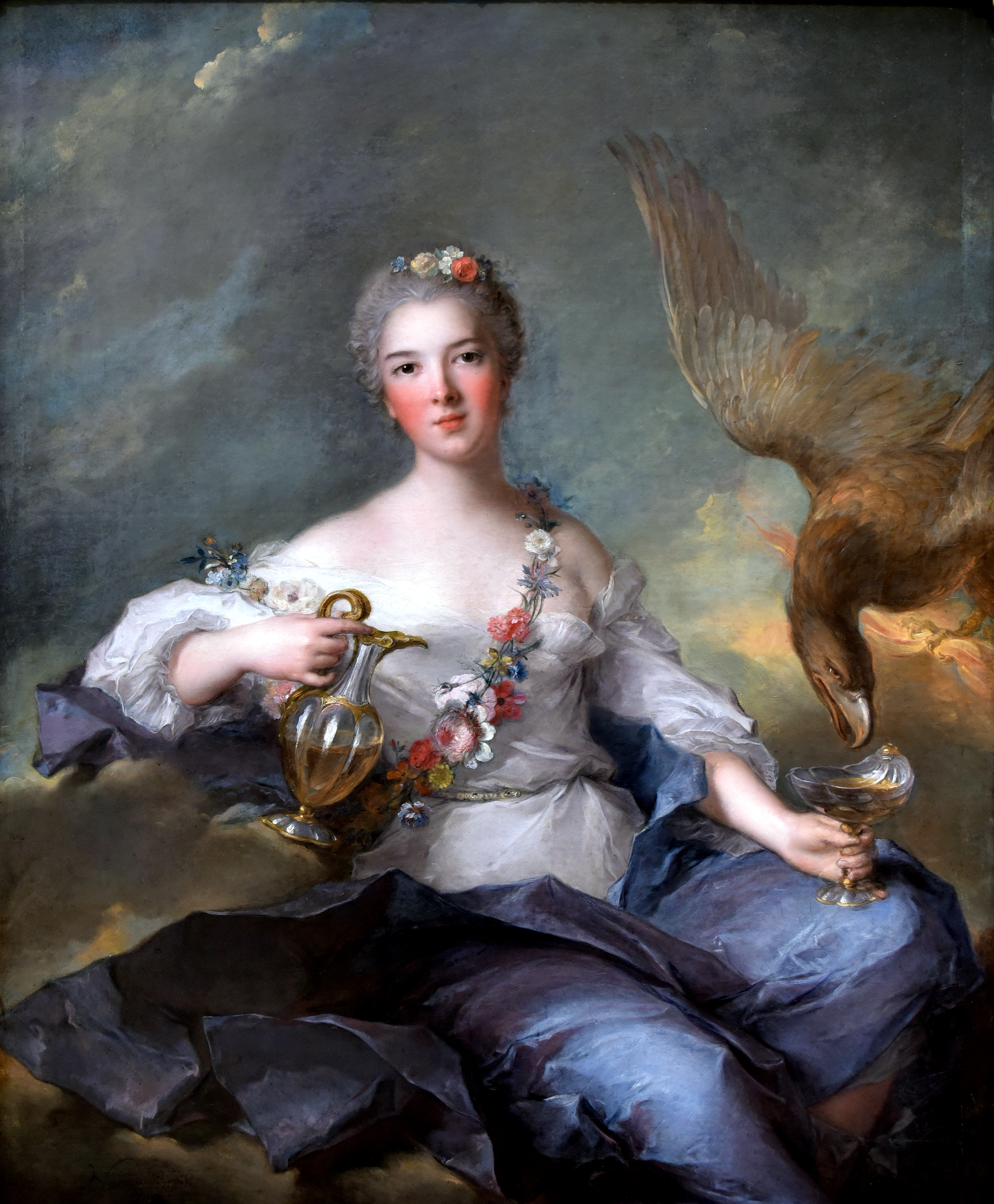
Duchesse de Chartres as Hebe

The 1753 Marquis de Marigny is in the collection of the Staatliche Kunsthalle Karlsruhe.

The Getty Museum has Madame Bonier de la Mosson as Diana, 1742. The Metropolitan Museum of Art has Madame de Maison-Rouge as Diana, 1756. The 1744 Duchesse de Chartres as Hebe Nationalmuseum is in the collection of the Nationalmuseum.

== Select gallery ==
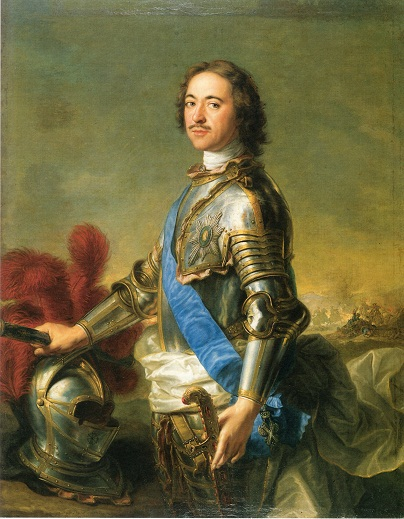
Tsar Peter I
(1717)
Saint Petersburg, Hermitage Museum

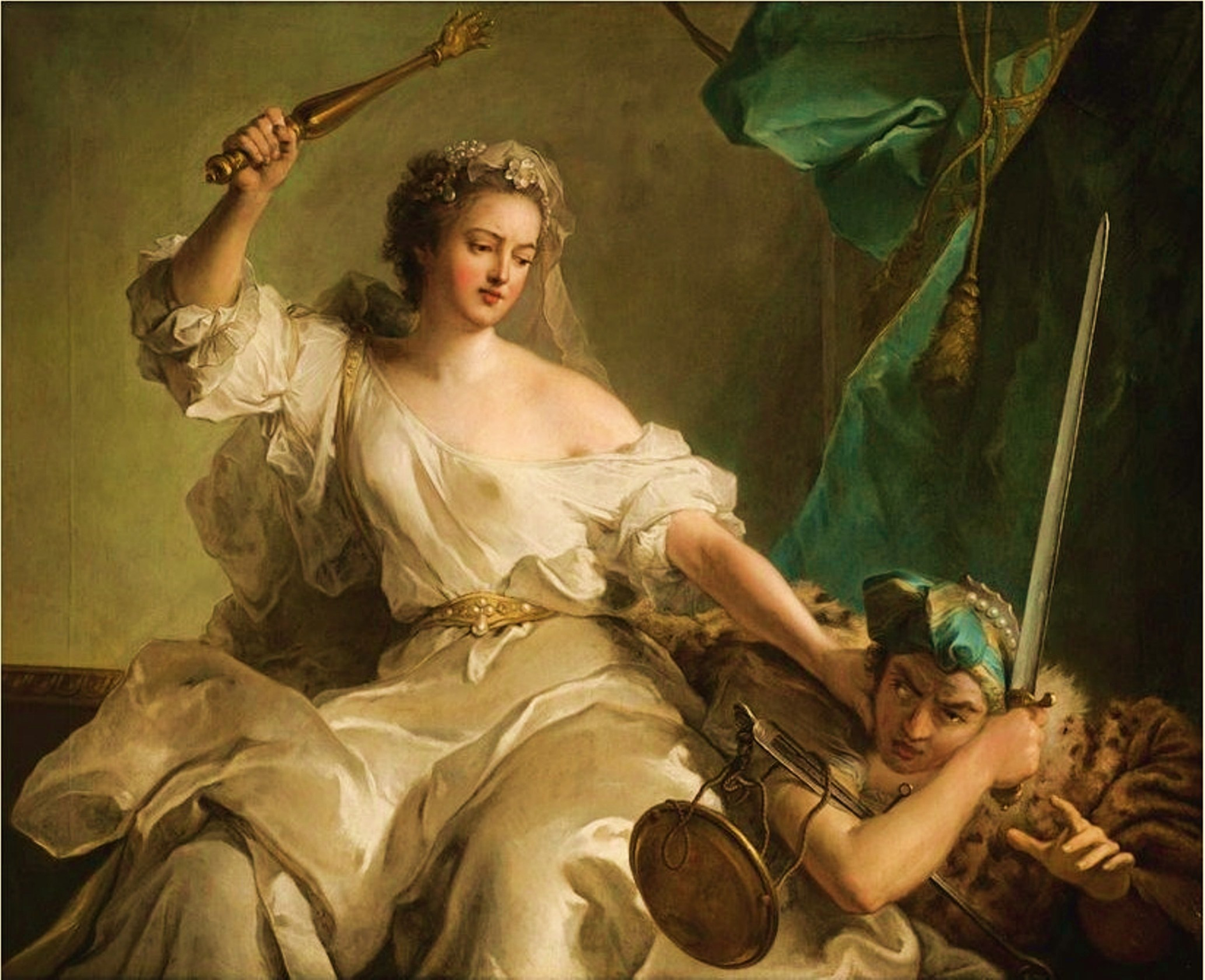
Justice punishing Injustice
(1737)
Justice is represented by
Madame Adélaïde de France
Private collection, Paris

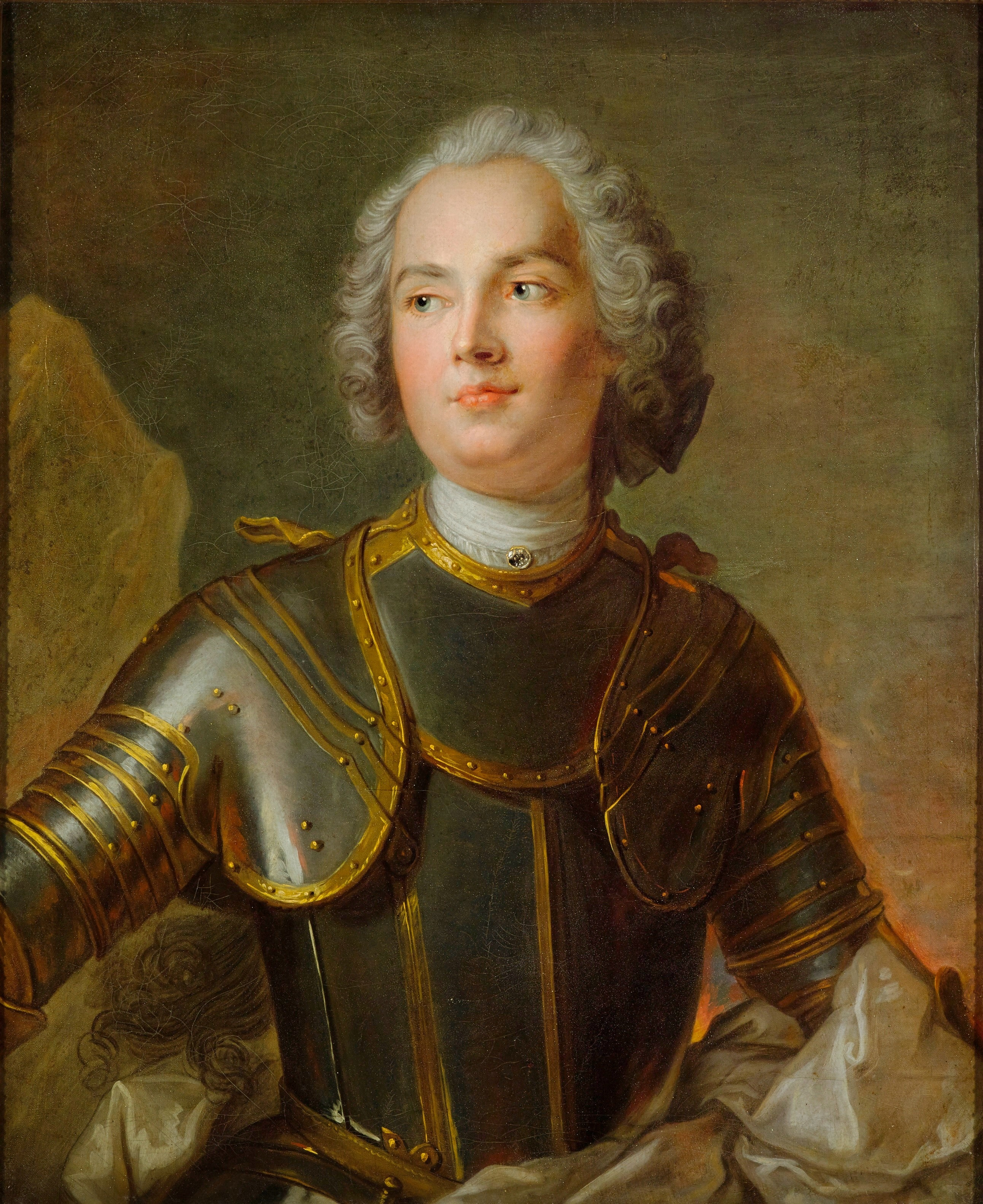
Adam Tarło
(1740)
Warsaw, Royal Castle

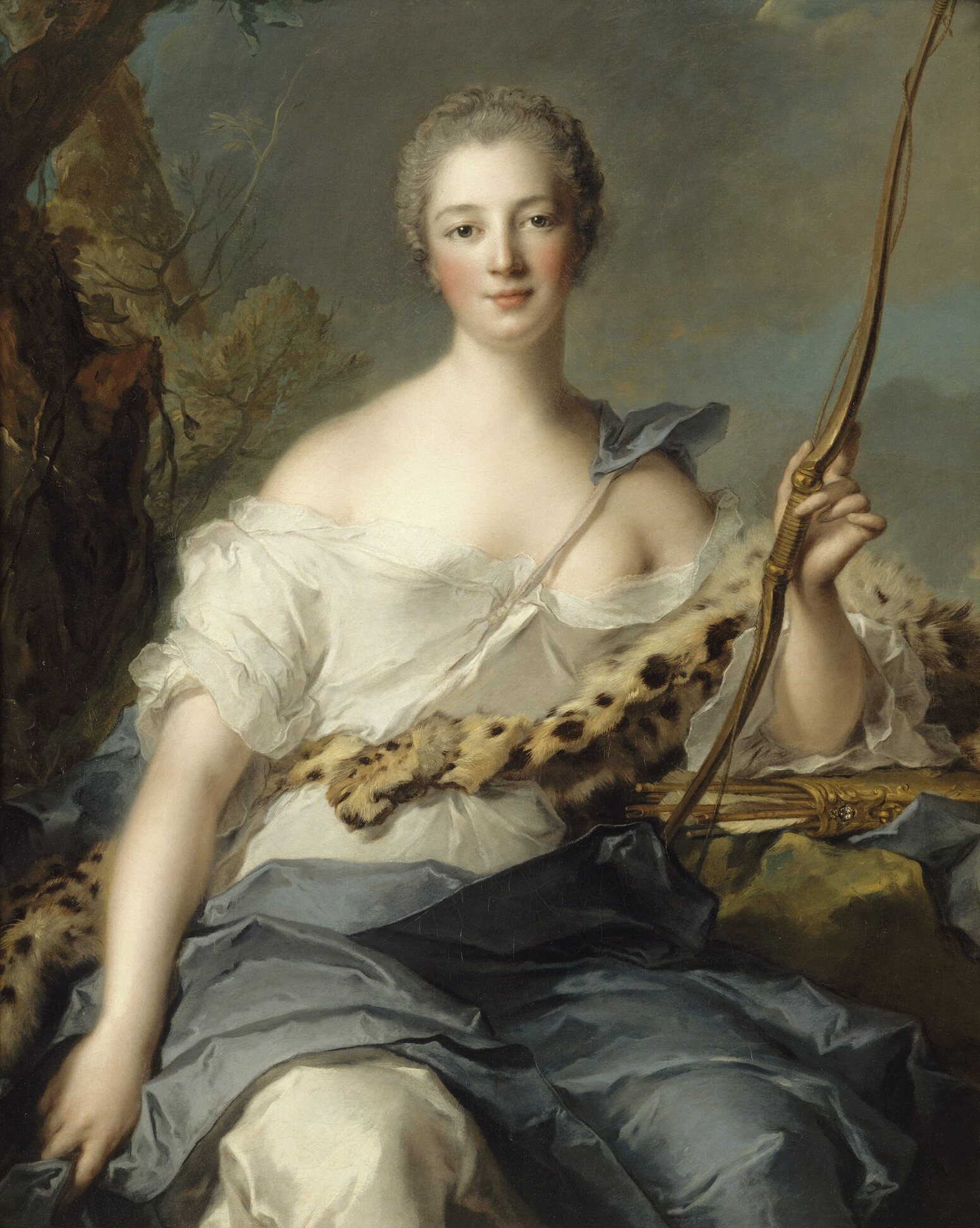
Madame de Pompadour as Diana the Huntress
(1746)
Versailles, Musée national du Château et des Trianons

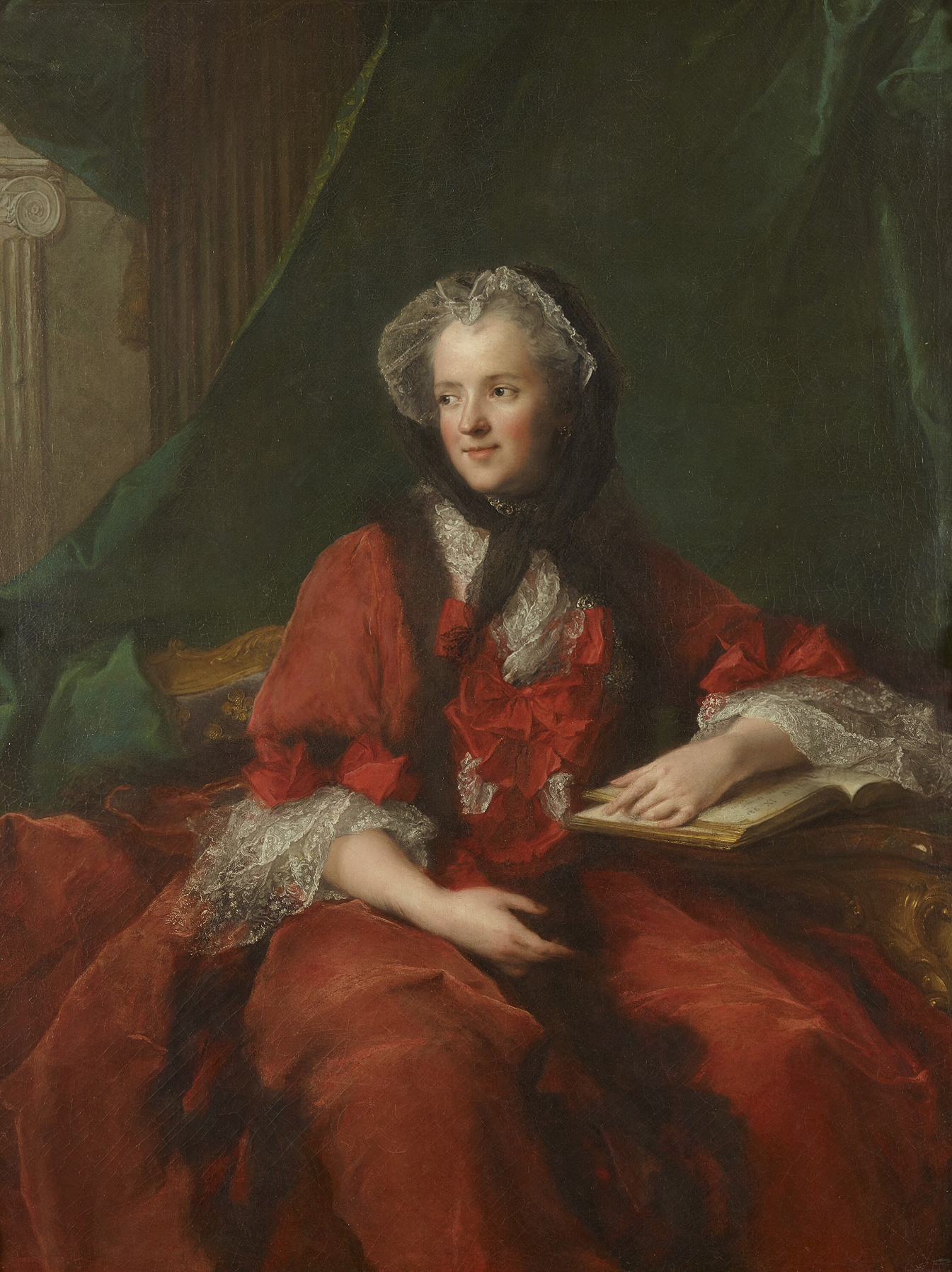
Marie Leszczyńska, Queen of France, Reading the Bible
(1748)
Versailles, Musée national du Château et des Trianons

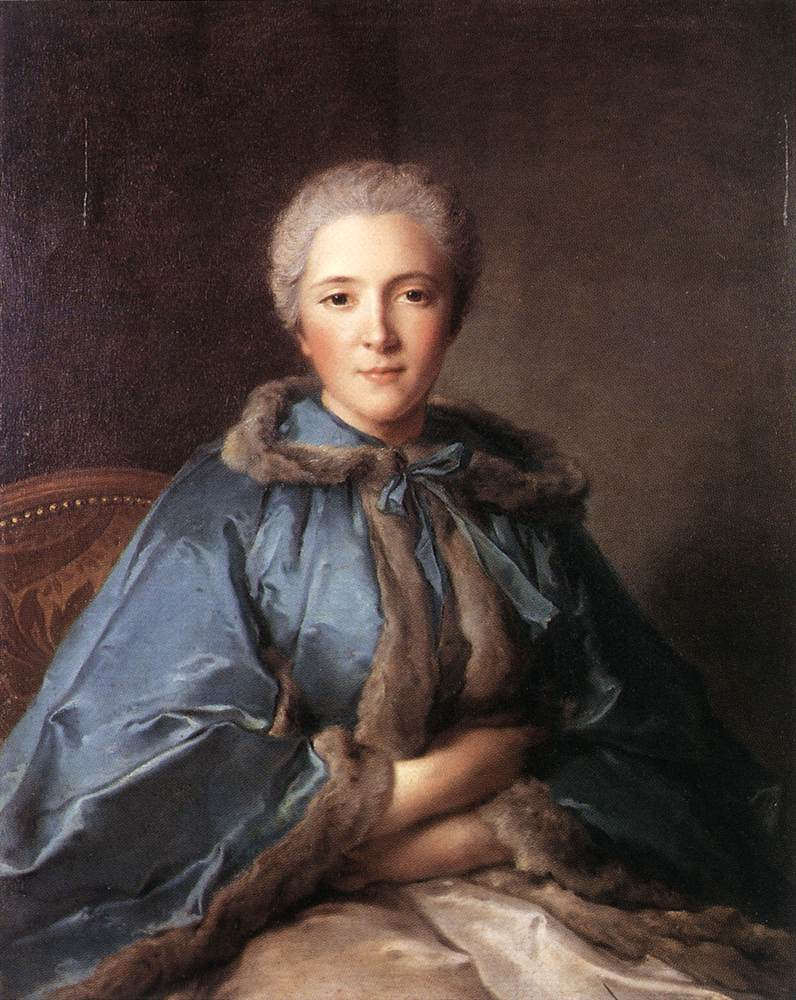
The Comtesse de Tillières
(1750)
London, Wallace Collection

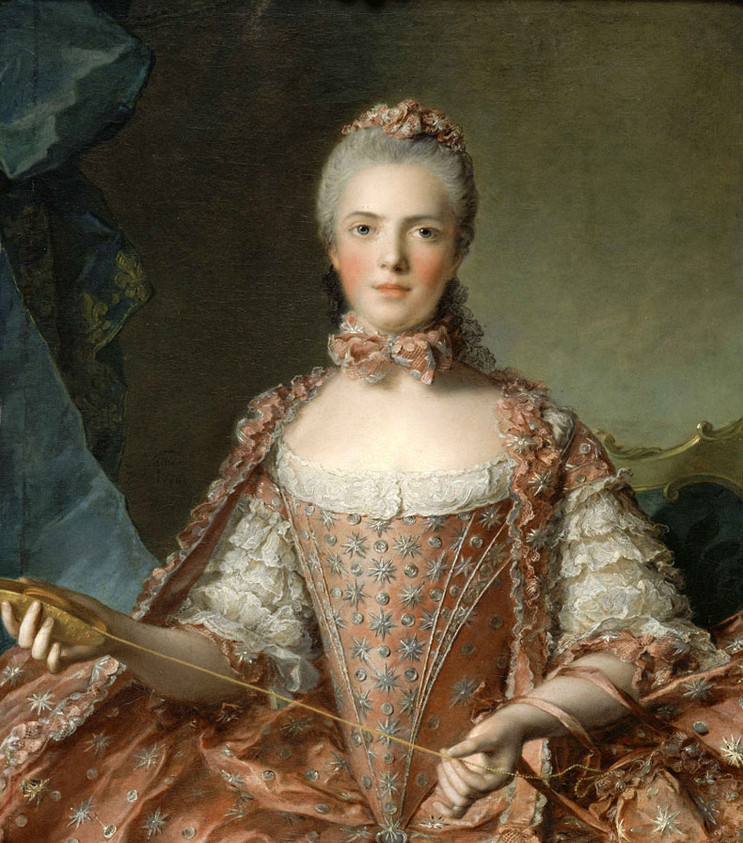
Madame Adélaïde de France Tying Knots
(1756)
Versailles, Musée national du Château et des Trianons

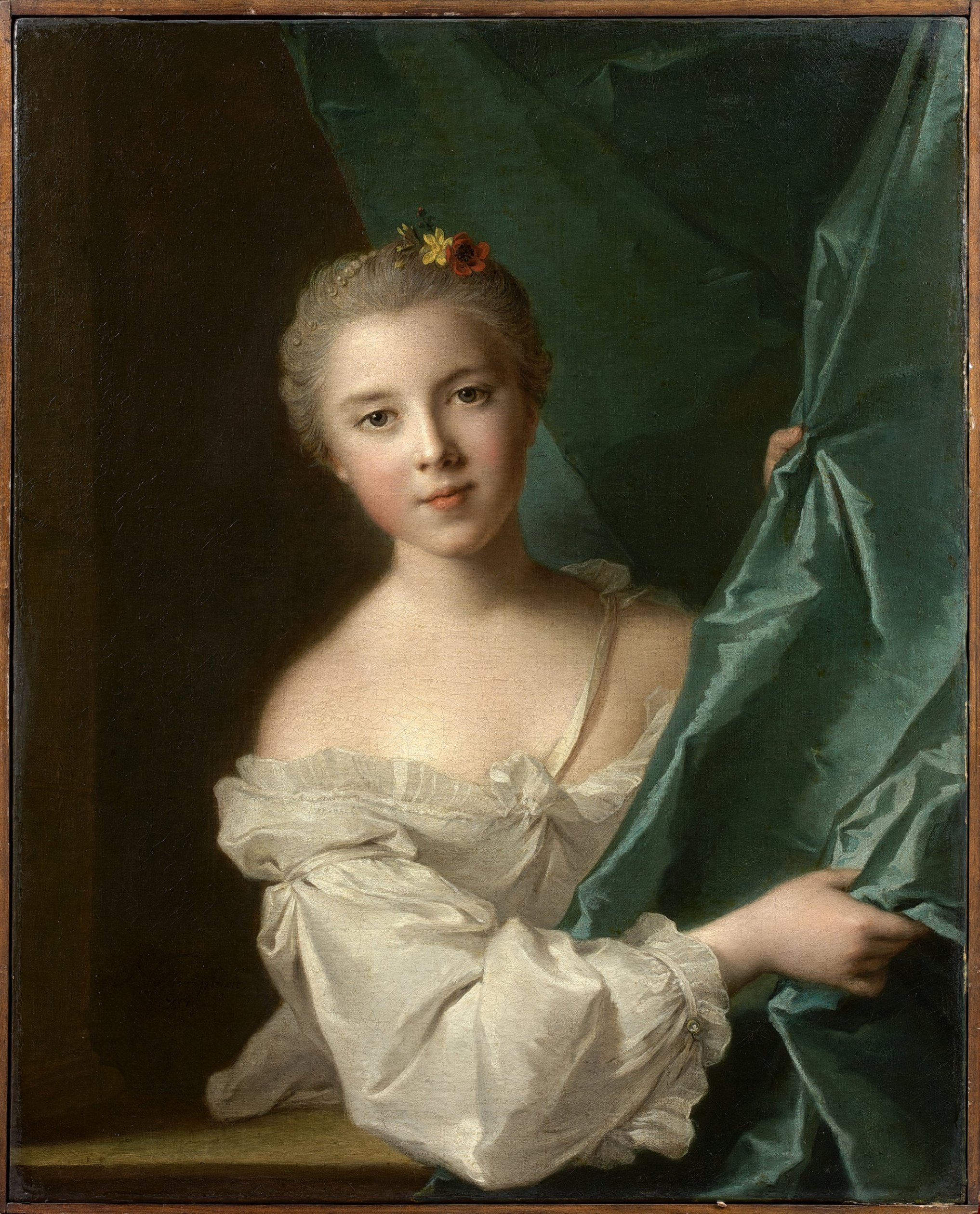
Éléonore Louise Le Gendre de Berville (1740-1761)
Marquise du Hallay-Coëtquen
(1751)
Private collection, Paris

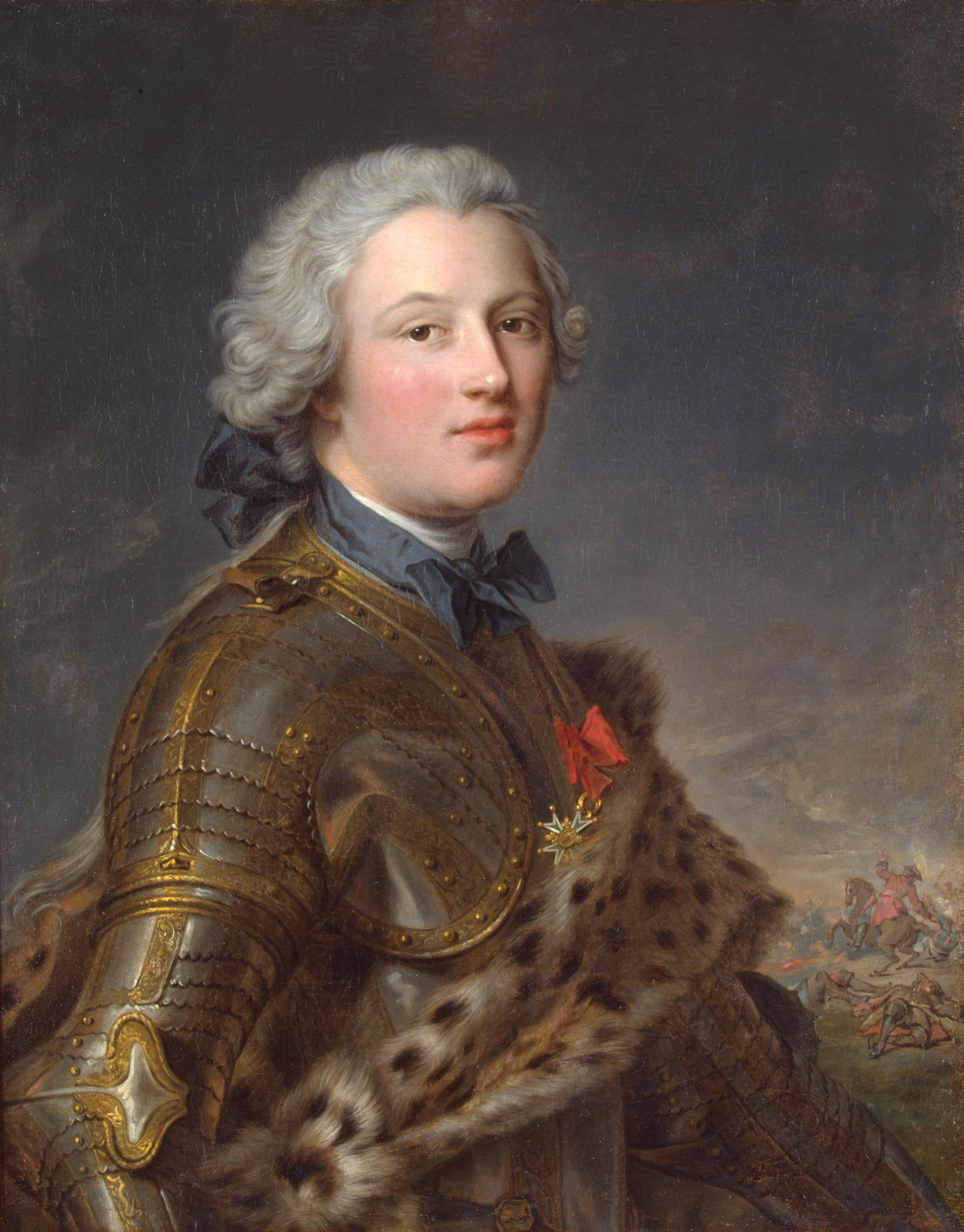
Pierre Victor, Baron de Besenval de Brunstatt
(1766)
Saint Petersburg, Hermitage Museum (formerly in the Hôtel de Besenval)

== Sources ==
- Nattier: Jean-Marc Nattier Masters in Art: A Series of Illustrated Monographs: Issued Monthly; June, 1902, Part 30, Vol. 3, (Bates & Guild Co., Boston)
