= Alexandrine Le Normant d'Étiolles =

Child of Madame de Pompadour (1744–1754)

Alexandrine d'Étiolles
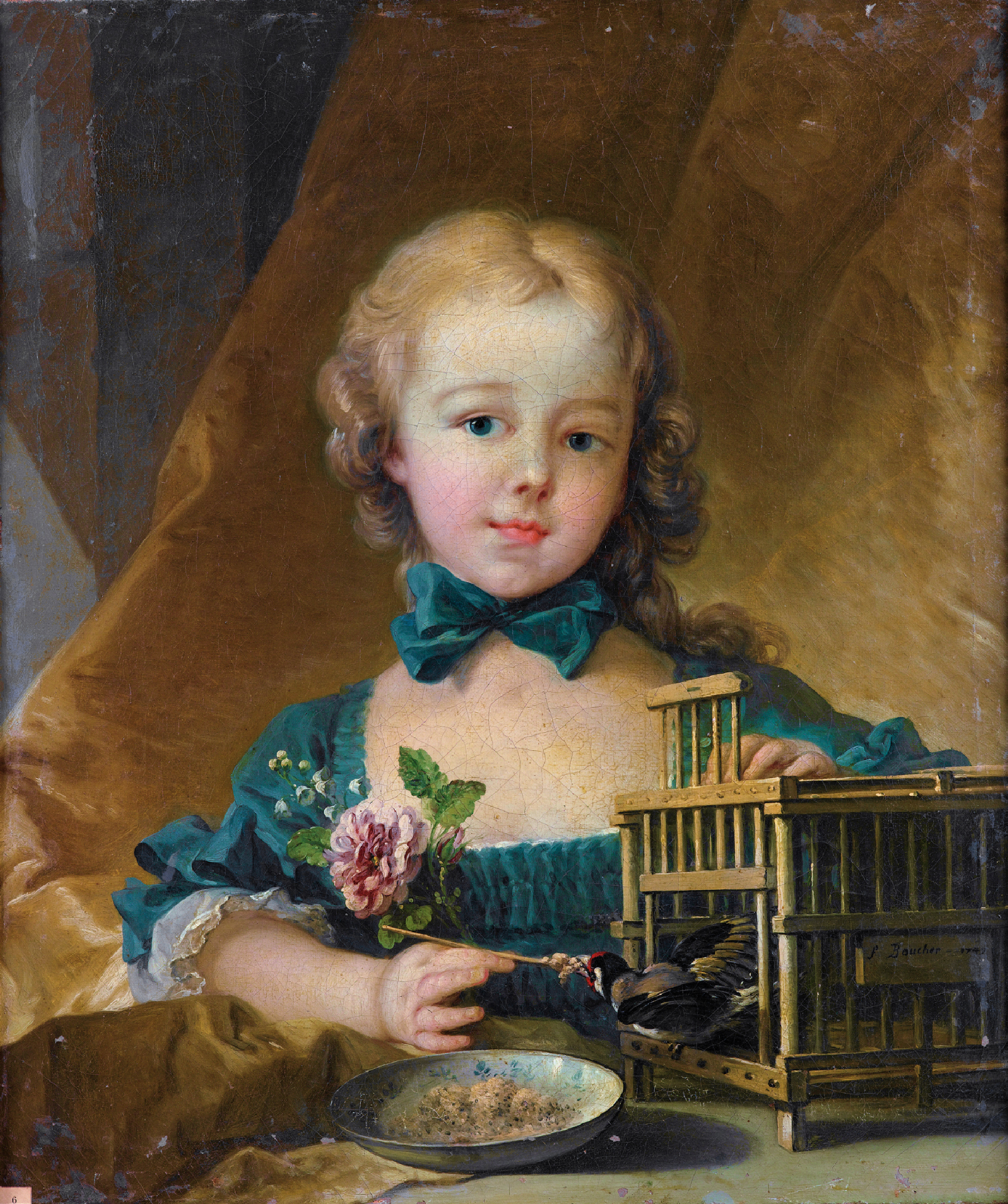
- Portrait by François Boucher from 1749
- Born: 10 August 1744; Paris, France
- Died: 15 June 1754 (aged 9); Convent of the Assumption, Rue Saint-Honoré, Paris, France
- Resting place: Couvent des Capucines, rue de la Paix, Paris, France; 48°52′8.87″N 2°19′52.06″W
- Other names: Alexandrine-Jeanne Le Normant d’Étiolles; Madame Alexandrine
- Known for: Daughter of Madame de Pompadour.
- Parent(s): Madame de Pompadour; Charles-Guillaume Le Normant d’Étiolles

Alexandrine-Jeanne Le Normant d’Étiolles (10 August 1744 – 15 June 1754) was the daughter of Madame de Pompadour, the maîtresse-en-titre of King Louis XV of France. She died in childhood.

== Life ==
Alexandrine-Jeanne Le Normant d’Étiolles was born on 10 August 1744 to Charles-Guillaume Le Normant d’Étiolles and his wife Jeanne-Antoinette Poisson. She was named after her mother’s friend, author and salon host Claudine-Alexandrine Guérin de Tencin. It is possible that her parents were first cousins, as her mother’s biological father may have been Charles-François Paul Le Normant de Tournehem (who became Madame d’Étiolles’ guardian when her legal father, her mother’s husband, went into exile). Alexandrine had one sibling, an older brother named Charles-Guillaume-Louis (born December 1741, died before December 1742) who had already died by the time she was born.

Alexandrine’s mother aimed to become the maîtresse-en-titre of King Louis XV. She achieved this by March 1745. However, to be introduced at court, she needed a noble title. The King and Madame d’Étiolles decided that she should separate from her husband, and the proceedings were initiated by 9 May. Madame d’Étiolles requested custody of her nine-month-old daughter. She was then made marquise of Pompadour and began to be known as Madame de Pompadour. Monsieur d’Étiolles was devastated and angered, threatening suicide, but soon accepted the situation. He started a new family with his mistress in 1754.

Alexandrine had been sent to a village wet nurse where her mother visited her often and brought her to Versailles more and more as she matured. After being weaned, she continued to be raised by a nurse and other domestic staff, but regularly spent time in her mother’s apartments or visited her maternal grandfather, François Poisson, who loved her affectionately. She grew up in a warm environment provided by her mother, maternal grandfather, and maternal uncle, Abel-François Poisson de Vandières, Marquis of Marigny and Menars.

She was known as ‘Madame Alexandrine’, following the form of addressing the filles de France, but her family nicknamed her ‘Fanfan’. She was described as ‘very thin’ but healthy. Her education was supervised by the novelist Claud Prosper Jolyot de Crébillon, her mother’s friend and former teacher. At the age of six, Alexandrine was placed at the Convent of the Assumption in the rue Saint-Honoré in Paris, where many daughters of the aristocracy were raised, in order to prepare her for a career at court. Before entering, she spent a week with her mother in Marly-le-Roi. Madame de Pompadour was worried to leave her child in Paris but considered convent schooling important for her later success. She continued to spend time with her as often as possible.

=== Marriage plans ===
Her mother started arranging for Alexandrine a marriage that could integrate their family into the aristocracy. Pompadour’s first proposal was an illegitimate son of the King, Charles de Vintimille, Count of Luc. He was three years older than Alexandrine and the two occasionally played together. However, Louis XV did not agree to the plan. Pompadour then negotiated with Antoine de Vignerot du Plessis, Duke of Richelieu about a union between Alexandrine and the Duke’s son and heir, Armand-Emmanuel, Count of Chinon. Richelieu refused the idea, saying that as his wife was related to the House of Lorraine, the match would need to be approved by the Holy Roman Emperor, Francis I of Lorraine. He argued that the imperial court (headed by Empress Maria Theresa) would never agree to one of the Emperor’s relatives marrying a girl of middle-class origins, although this was probably an excuse for her own unwillingness. Although Pompadour could hope for an advantageous marriage for her daughter, the highest-ranking families did not want to be related to her. In the summer of 1752, she agreed with her close friend, Michel-Ferdinand d’Albert d’Ailly, Duke of Chaulnes, that Alexandrine would marry his only child, Louis-Joseph d’Albert d’Ailly, Duke of Picquigny. They decided that the wedding would take place when Alexandrine was thirteen. It was also rumoured that her uncle Marigny wanted to marry Alexandrine himself.

== Death ==
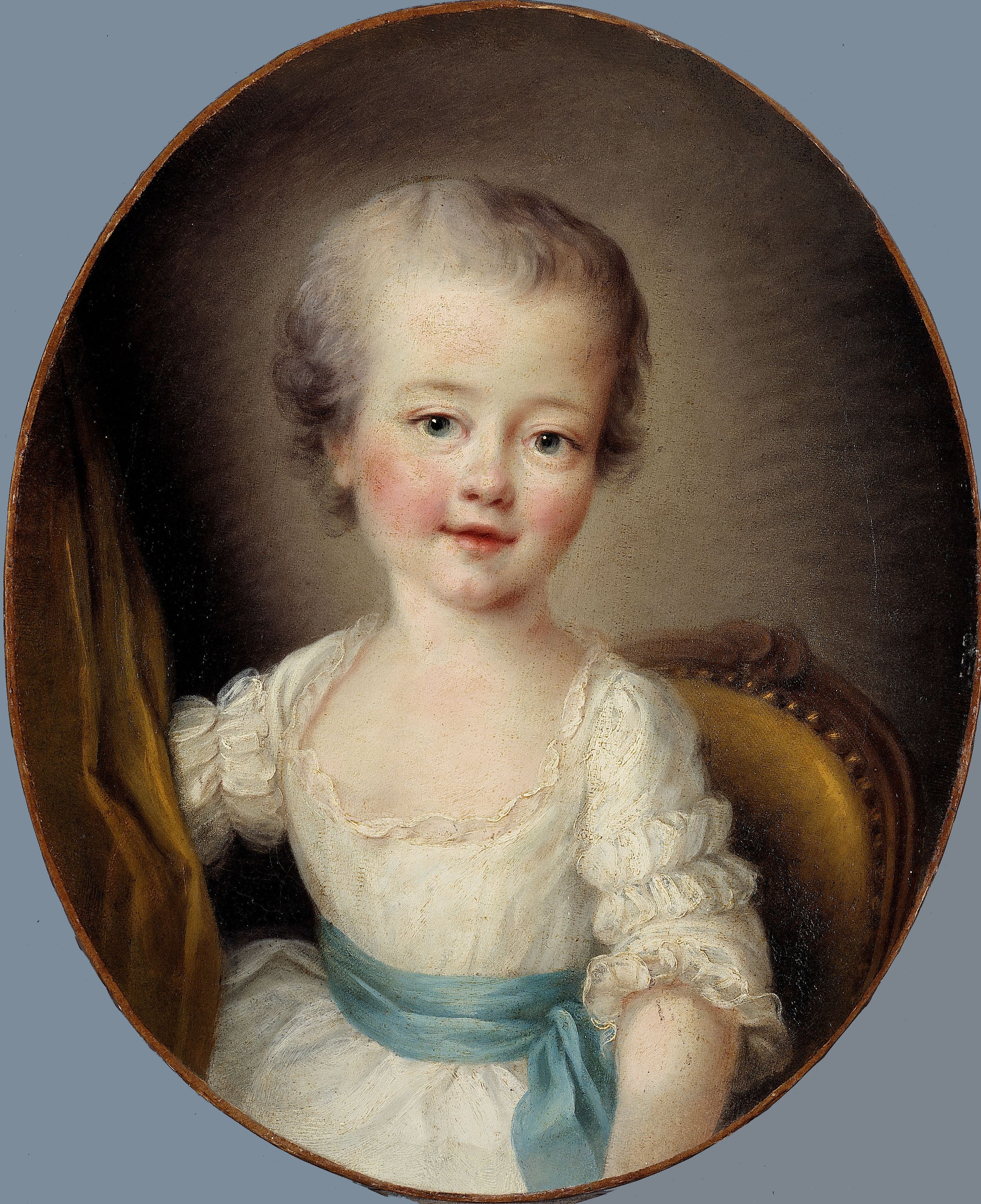
Contemporary portrait of Alexandrine by François-Hubert Drouais.

On 14 June 1754, Alexandrine (still living at the convent) became ill with a high fever and convulsions. It was initially thought that she had indigestion. The nuns informed her parents; most biographies state that her father rushed to her, although Margaret Crosland claims there is no proof of this. Pevitt says that Pompadour was at the Château de Choisy with the King and could not leave to see her daughter, while Crosland claims that she was not at court and could not be reached in time. Whatever the reason, she could not be with Alexandrine on her last day. Louis XV sent his own physicians, Jean-Baptiste Sénac and Germain Pichault de La Martinière but Alexandrine had died by the time they arrived. She died on 15 June 1754, less than two months before her tenth birthday, probably of peritonitis or appendicitis.

Pompadour was so stricken by grief when she was informed of her child’s death that onlookers feared she would collapse and die herself. She left court to spend a week in her Château de Bellevue, being ‘very afflicted and unwell’. Six weeks later, a contemporary reported that she acted happy, not displaying her grief over her daughter’s death, as that would have ‘done harm to her looks’ and endangered her position as maîtresse-en-titre. Privately, she remained ‘deeply shaken’. The contemporary noted that this behaviour was regular for courtiers. Her grandfather, François Poisson, who had already been ill, died four or ten days after Alexandrine, devastated by her death. Pompadour never recovered from Alexandrine’s death, which made her feel hopeless about the future.

Alexandrine was buried in the Convent of the Assumption. Four months after her death, her body was transferred to the Capuchin Convent in Paris, where her mother had purchased a vault for the family. Her grave was inscribed, ‘Here lies Alexandrine-Jeanne, daughter of Messire Charles-Guillaume Le Normant and Jeanne-Antoinette Poisson, Marquise de Pompadour, Dame de Crécy, etc’. Pompadour often visited the grave to pray. The remains of her maternal grandmother, Madeleine de La Motte, were also taken there, and Pompadour herself would later be interred there. The vault was damaged during the Revolution and the surrounding buildings rebuilt, inhibiting access to the tomb which, as of 2024, is under the rue de la Paix in Paris.
