= Adelaide Filleul, Marquise de Souza-Botelho =

French novelist (1761–1836)

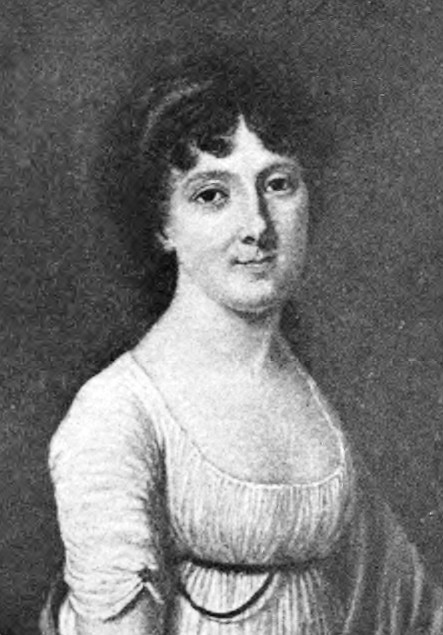
Adelaide Filleul

Adélaïde-Émilie (sometimes Émilie-Adélaïde) Filleul, Marquise de Souza-Botelho (14 May 1761 – 19 April 1836) was a French writer.

== Biography ==
She was born in Paris.

Her mother, Marie Irène Cathérine de Buisson, daughter of the Seigneur de Longpré, near Falaise, married a bourgeois of that town named Charles François Filleul. It was reported, though no proof is forthcoming, that Madame Filleul had been the mistress of Louis XV, having by him a daughter, Julie Filleul (1751 – 1822), although never recognized. Madame Filleul then become the mistress of financier Étienne-Michel Bouret who, according to writer Jean Orieux, is Adelaide's true father; according to others (including her grandson Charles, duc de Morny), her father was also the king. Charles François Filleul became one of the king's secretaries, and Madame Filleul made many friends, among them Jean-François Marmontel. Julie Filleul married at the Château de Menars in 1767 Abel-François Poisson, marquis de Vandières et de Marigny (1727–1781), the brother of Madame de Pompadour; Adelaide married on 30 November 1779 Charles François de Flahaut de La Billarderie, comte de Flahaut de La Billarderie, a soldier of some reputation, who was many years her senior.

In Paris she soon gathered round her a salon, in which the principal figure was Charles Maurice de Talleyrand. There are many allusions to their liaison in the diary of Founding Father Gouverneur Morris, who was another of her lovers. In 1785 was born her son Charles, comte de Flahaut, who was generally known to be Talleyrand's son. Madame de Flahaut fled from Paris in 1792 and joined the society of émigrés at Mickleham, Surrey, described in Madame d'Arblay's Memoirs. Her husband remained at Boulogne-sur-Mer, where he was arrested on 29 January 1793 and guillotined. Madame de Flahaut now supported herself by writing novels, of which the first, Adèle de Sénanges (London, 1794), which is partly autobiographical, was the most famous.

She presently left London for Switzerland, where she met Louis Philippe, duke of Orleans. She travelled in his company to Hamburg, where she lived for two years, earning her living as a milliner. She returned to Paris in 1798, and on 17 October 1802 she married Dom José Maria de Sousa Botelho Mourão e Vasconcelos (Porto, 9 March 1758 – Paris, 1 June 1825), Portuguese minister plenipotentiary in Paris, 2nd Lord of the Majorat of Mateus, who was previously married in Lisbon on 23 November 1783 to Dona Maria Teresa de Noronha, of the Lords of the Majorat of Apréstimos, by whom he had an only son, José Luís de Sousa Botelho Mourão e Vasconcelos, future 1st Count of Vila Real. Her husband was recalled in 1804, and was offered the Saint Petersburg embassy; but in the next year he resigned, to settle permanently in Paris, where he had many friends, among them Jean Charles Léonard de Sismondi. He spent his time chiefly in the preparation of a beautiful edition of the Lusiads of Luís de Camões, which he completed in 1817.

Madame de Souza lost her social power after the fall of the First Empire, and was deserted even by Talleyrand, although he continued his patronage of Charles de Flahaut. Her husband died in 1825, and after the accession of Louis Philippe she lived in comparative retirement till her death. She brought up her grandson, Charles, duc de Morny, her son's natural son by Queen Hortense de Beauharnais. Among her later novels were La Comtesse de Fargy (1822) and La Duchesse de Guise (1831). Her complete works were published between 1811 and 1822.
