= The Setting of the Sun =

Painting by François Boucher

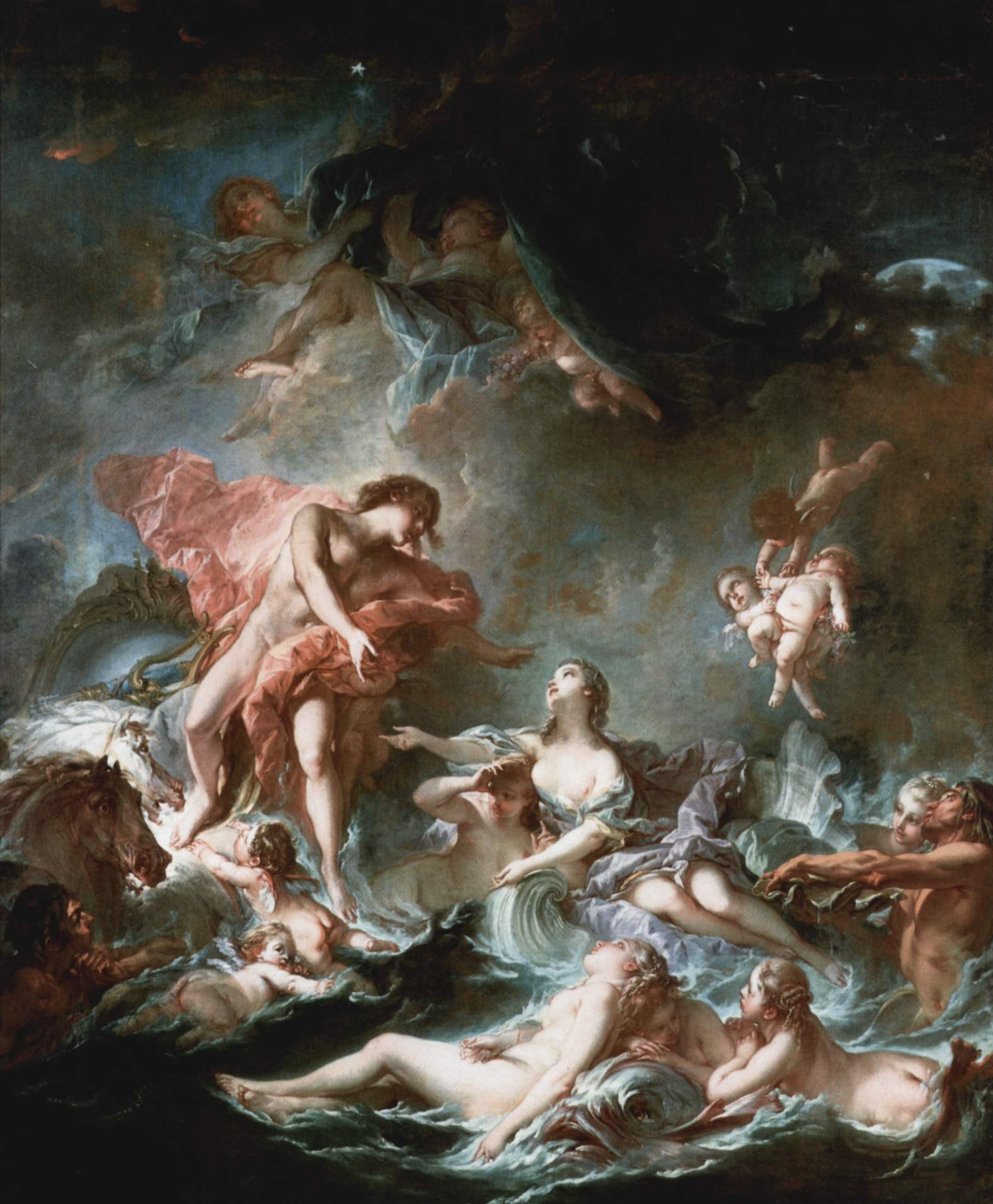
- Artist: François Boucher
- Year: 1752
- Medium: oil on canvas
- Dimensions: 318 cm × 261 cm (125 in × 103 in)
- Location: Wallace Collection, London

The Setting of the Sun is a 1752 oil-on-canvas painting by the French painter François Boucher. It and its pair The Rising of the Sun were both private commissions for Madame de Pompadour as full-scale models for the Gobelins Manufactory. The tapestries produced from the paintings were completed in 1754–1755 and hung in the king's bedroom at château de Bellevue. They were sold together with the rest of her collection on 28 April 1766 and passed through four other collections before being bought on 2 August 1855 by Richard Seymour-Conway, 4th Marquess of Hertford. Like the rest of his collection, they now hang in the Wallace Collection in London.

== Description ==
Representing the rhythm of the day, Boucher creates an integrated pairing layered with allegory and symbolism.

In The Setting of the Sun, the god Apollo returns to his mother's arms, bringing dusk along with him, represented by muted pinks, browns, and creams. The foregrounds of both canvases are populated by the nude bodies of nymphs and naiads, overlapping with one another to create a series of arabesque curves that are echoed in the forms of the waves. The meeting of sky and sea affirms the mythological setting of Boucher's paintings. There are 17 mythological humans in the painting which as shown are eight women, three men, and six babies. Including two majestic white horses.

These mythological scenes of harmonious pastels, beautiful nude bodies and gauzy textures exemplify the visual elegance of the Rococo aesthetic; their decorative nature is further enhanced by their function as designs for tapestries, which would have served to adorn and complement a luxurious and fashionable home.
