= The Rising of the Sun =

1752 painting by François Boucher

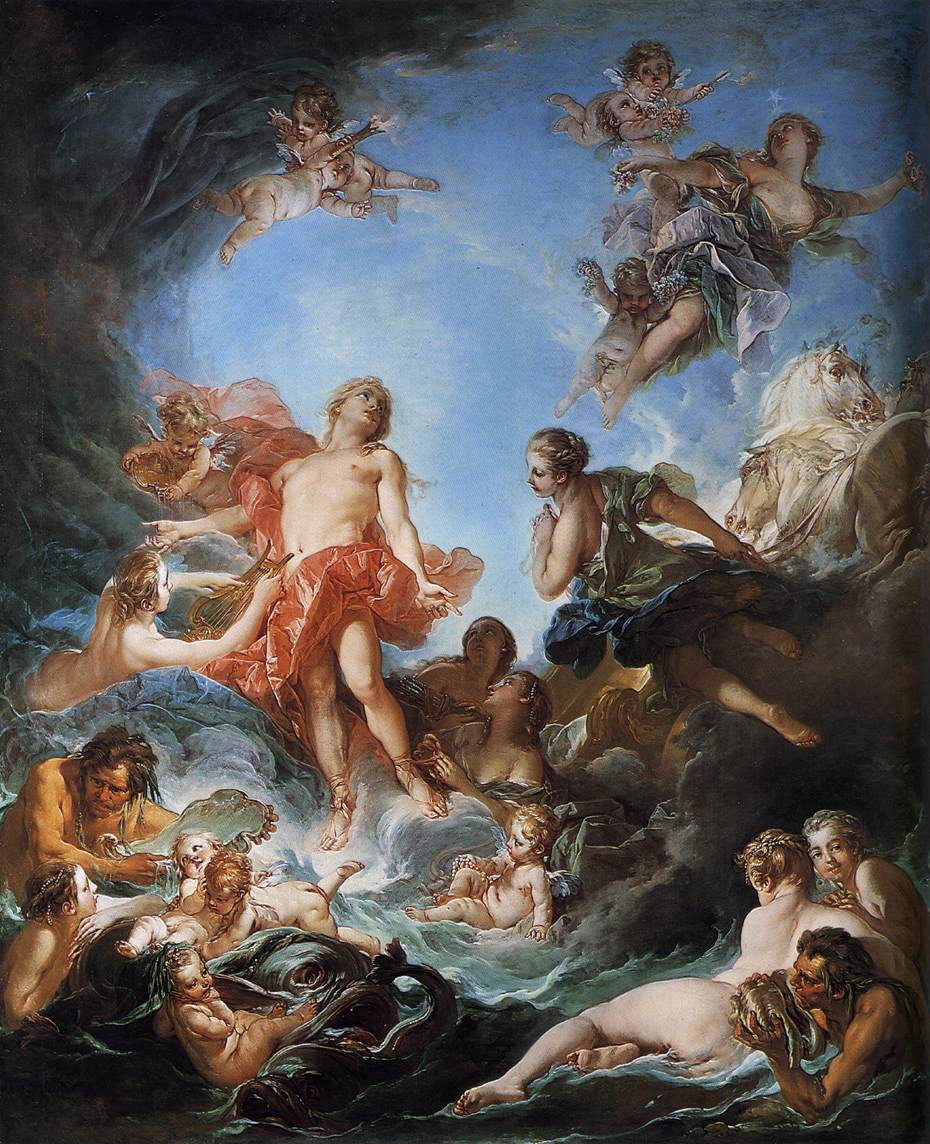
- Artist: François Boucher
- Year: 1752
- Medium: oil on canvas
- Dimensions: 378 cm × 261 cm (149 in × 103 in)
- Location: Wallace Collection, London

The Rising of the Sun is a 1752 oil-on-canvas painting by the French artist François Boucher. It and its pair The Setting of the Sun were both private commissions for Madame de Pompadour as full-scale models for the Gobelins Manufactory. The tapestries produced from the paintings were completed in 1754–1755 and hung in the king's bedroom at château de Bellevue. They were sold together with the rest of her collection on 28 April 1766 and passed through four other collections before being bought on 2 August 1855 by Richard Seymour-Conway, 4th Marquess of Hertford. Like the rest of his collection, they now hang in the Wallace Collection in London.

== Description ==
Often described as Boucher's most ambitious and successful mythological works, this painting and its mate were not intended to be displayed as paintings, but rather to serve as models for tapestries to be hung in the bedroom of King Louis XV's country chateau.

Representing the rhythm of the day, Boucher creates an integrated pairing layered with allegory and symbolism. In The Rising of the Sun, the god Apollo ascends into the sky with arms outstretched, chasing away the nocturnal darkness. Turquoise and azure blues announce the clarity of the day, the strong light of the morning brought into relief in the shadows cast upon the sculptural body of the young god of the sun. The foregrounds of the canvas is populated by the nude bodies of nymphs and naiads, overlapping with one another to create a series of arabesque curves that are echoed in the forms of the waves. The meeting of sky and sea affirms the mythological setting of Boucher's painting.

Some art historians have interpreted the depiction of Thetis, the nymph who appears in The Rising of the Sun as a tribute to her; Thetis, who holds the reins of Apollo's horses, was said to aid the god in his voyage across the sky, and Madame de Pompadour had recently taken a more active role as a political advisor in the King's court.

These mythological scenes of harmonious pastels, beautiful nude bodies and gauzy textures exemplify the visual elegance of the Rococo aesthetic; their decorative nature is further enhanced by their function as designs for tapestries, which would have served to adorn and complement a luxurious and fashionable home.
