= Irène du Buisson de Longpré =

Irène du Buisson de Longpré (c. 1720–1767), was a French noblewoman, mistress to King Louis XV. She was the king's Petite maîtresse (unofficial mistress), not his Maîtresse-en-titre (official mistress).

== Life ==
She was the daughter of Jacques du Buisson, seigneur de Longpré, and Irène de Séran de La Tour. In 1747, she married Charles François Filleul. She was apparently at one point employed in the household of the king's daughter, Princess Adélaïde. She is described by Jean-François Marmontel in his memoirs as a woman known for her affairs.

In around 1750, she attracted the attention of Louis XV, with whom she had an affair at about the same time as the king's affair to Marie Geneviève Radix de Sainte-Foy. The relationship was not an official one, as Madame de Pompadour remained the king's official mistress. Not long after this, Louis XV had Marie-Louise O'Murphy installed at the Parc-aux-Cerfs.

She had two daughters:

- Julie Filleul (1751–1822), who has been referred to as the daughter of the king, a paternity supported by the fact that the king acted as her wedding witness in her marriage to Abel-François Poisson in 1767. After the death of Abel-François, with whom she had a daughter who died young, she married François de La Cropte, marquis de Bourzac, in 1783.
- Adelaide Filleul (1761–1836), a writer, who was possibly the daughter of Étienne Michel Bouret (her godfather). She married Charles François de Flahaut de La Billarderie in 1779. During this marriage she would give birth to a son, Charles, comte de Flahaut, fathered by Charles Maurice de Talleyrand-Périgord and recognised by her husband. Widowed, she married José Maria de Sousa Botelho Mourão e Vasconcelos in 1802.
