= Marie Geneviève Radix de Sainte-Foy =

French noblewoman (1729-1809)

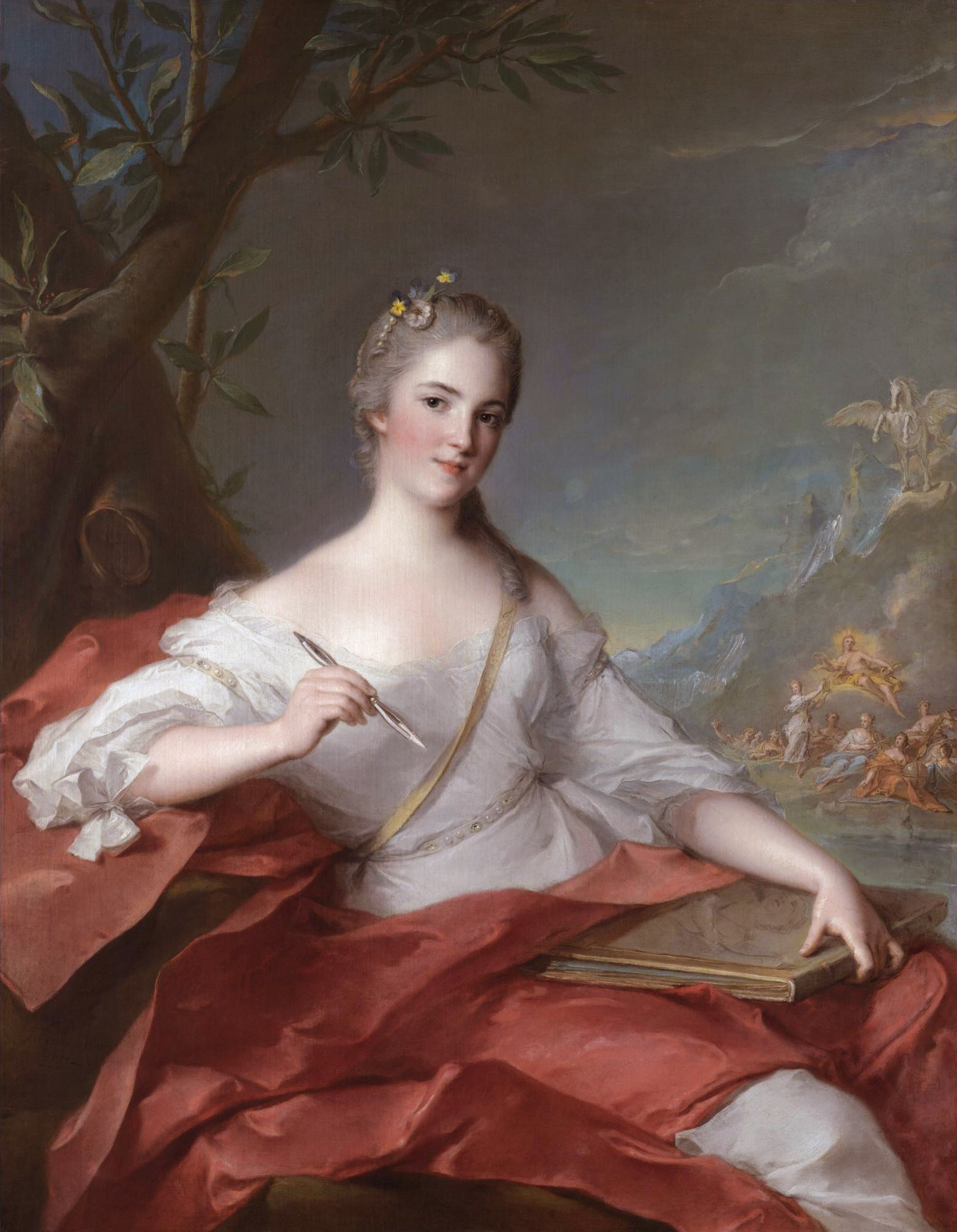
- Portrait by Jean-Marc Nattier, c. 1752
- Born: 1729
- Died: 1809 (aged 79–80)
- Spouse: Jean François Boudrey (m. 1760) Nicolas Augustin de Malbec de Montjoc (m. 1761)

Marie Geneviève Radix de Sainte-Foy (1729 – 1809) was a French noblewoman, a mistress of King Louis XV and his son Louis, Dauphin of France, throughout the years 1750–51. However, she was the King's Petite maîtresse (unofficial mistress), not his Maîtresse-en-titre (official mistress).

== Biography ==
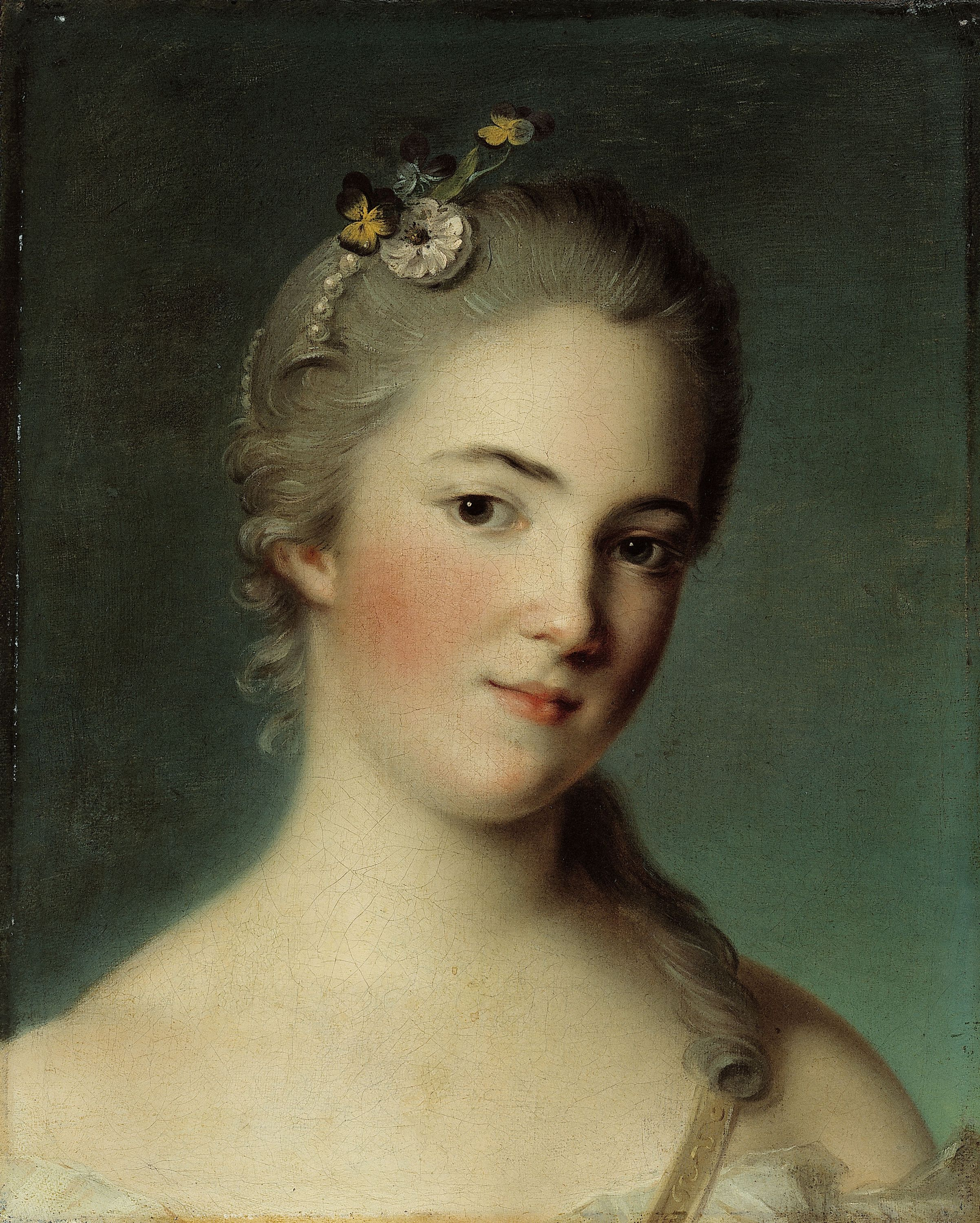
Portrait of Marie Geneviève Radix de Sainte-Foy, Musée Cognacq-Jay

Marie was the eldest of the three daughters of Claude-Mathieu Radix (payeur des rentes de l’Hôtel de Ville de Paris) and Marie-Élisabeth Geneviève Denis. Her sisters were Marie-Françoise Radix (who married Louis Masson, écuyer and secrétaire du roi) and Marie-Charlotte Radix (1733–1791), who married the magistrate Jean-Baptiste Talon and was the mother of Antoine-Omer Talon). Marie was the sister of Maximilien Radix de Sainte-Foix. André Doyon, Maximilien Radix de Sainte-Foy (1736–1810) (Paris: A. Pedone, 1966), p. 3

According to the traditional description of the event, she received an invitation to an assignation from both the King and the Dauphin at the same occasion; she showed her husband the invitation, and it was decided that she should accept the invitation of the King. Reportedly, she did so for monetary concerns. On a later occasion, however, she also accepted an assignation with the Dauphin, and for a time she alternated as the lover of both who, as expressed by René Louis de Voyer de Paulmy d'Argenson, "sailed to Cythera on the same ship". In both cases, the relationship was an unofficial one and in no effect was she ever an officially acknowledged mistress to either of them.

For the King the affair was a temporary one; it took place in at about the same time as the King's affair with Irène du Buisson de Longpré, and she was not regarded a threat to the position of Madame de Pompadour. In the case of the Dauphin, the matter was a more uncommon one, and the secret affair caused discontent with Maria Josepha of Saxony, Dauphine of France, because it was not usually the habit of the Dauphin to have affairs. Maria Josepha, however, reportedly became convinced that the matter was a purely temporary one during her pregnancy and that her spouse would never have an official mistress like his father. The affair did indeed prove to be temporary, and the Dauphin would indeed never have an official mistress.

Not long after this, Louis XV had Marie-Louise O'Murphy installed at the Parc-aux-Cerfs.
