= Château de Menars =

Castle (château) in Loir-et-Cher, France

Coordinates: 47.6388°N 1.4104°E

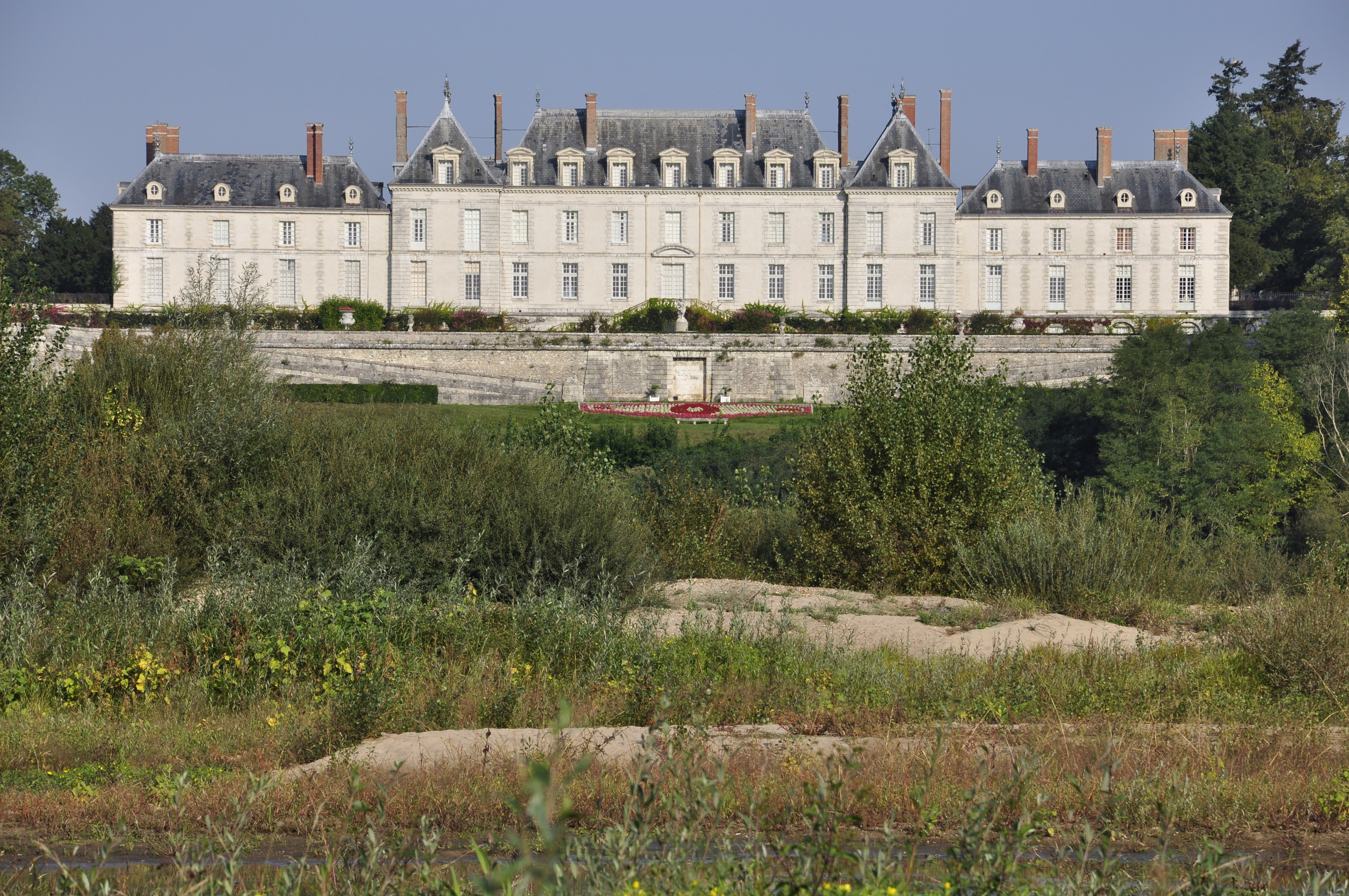

The Castle of Menars (French: château de Menars, pronounced [ʃɑto də menaʁ]) is a castle (château) associated with Madame de Pompadour situated on the bank of the river Loire in Menars, Loir-et-Cher, France.

== History ==
Towards 1646, Guillaume Charron, adviser of the King and general treasurer of extraordinary levies supplying French forces in the Thirty Years' War built his château on a superb site overlooking the river Loire at Menars. The original construction consisted of a main building and two pavilions. His son, Jean-Jacques Charron, président à mortier of the Parlement de Paris and brother-in-law of Jean-Baptiste Colbert, inherited the estate in 1669. He added two unequal wings to the château and enlarged the demesne, which Louis XIV made a marquisat in 1676. In 1725, it was given to Queen Marie Leszczyńska's parents, the deposed King and Queen of Poland, by Louis XV as one of their residences which they alternated with the Chateau de Chambord, until they left for the newly acquired Duchy of Lorraine in 1736.

In 1760, Menars was acquired by Madame de Pompadour, who paid almost 1,000,000 livres in installments and "sold some pearl bracelets to meet the first payment". The king's mistress charged the architect Ange-Jacques Gabriel with constructing two new wings on both sides of the two pavilions, which replace those built in the seventeenth century. To break the uniformity of the façade, Gabriel covered these two wings with flat roofs "à l'italienne". On each side of the main courtyard, he built two more pavilions: the Pavilion of the Clock on the right, which contains the kitchens and is connected to the château by a subterranean passageway, and the Pavillon of the Meridian on the left, where the caretaker's lodge is found. He also directed important alteration work on the interior of the building.

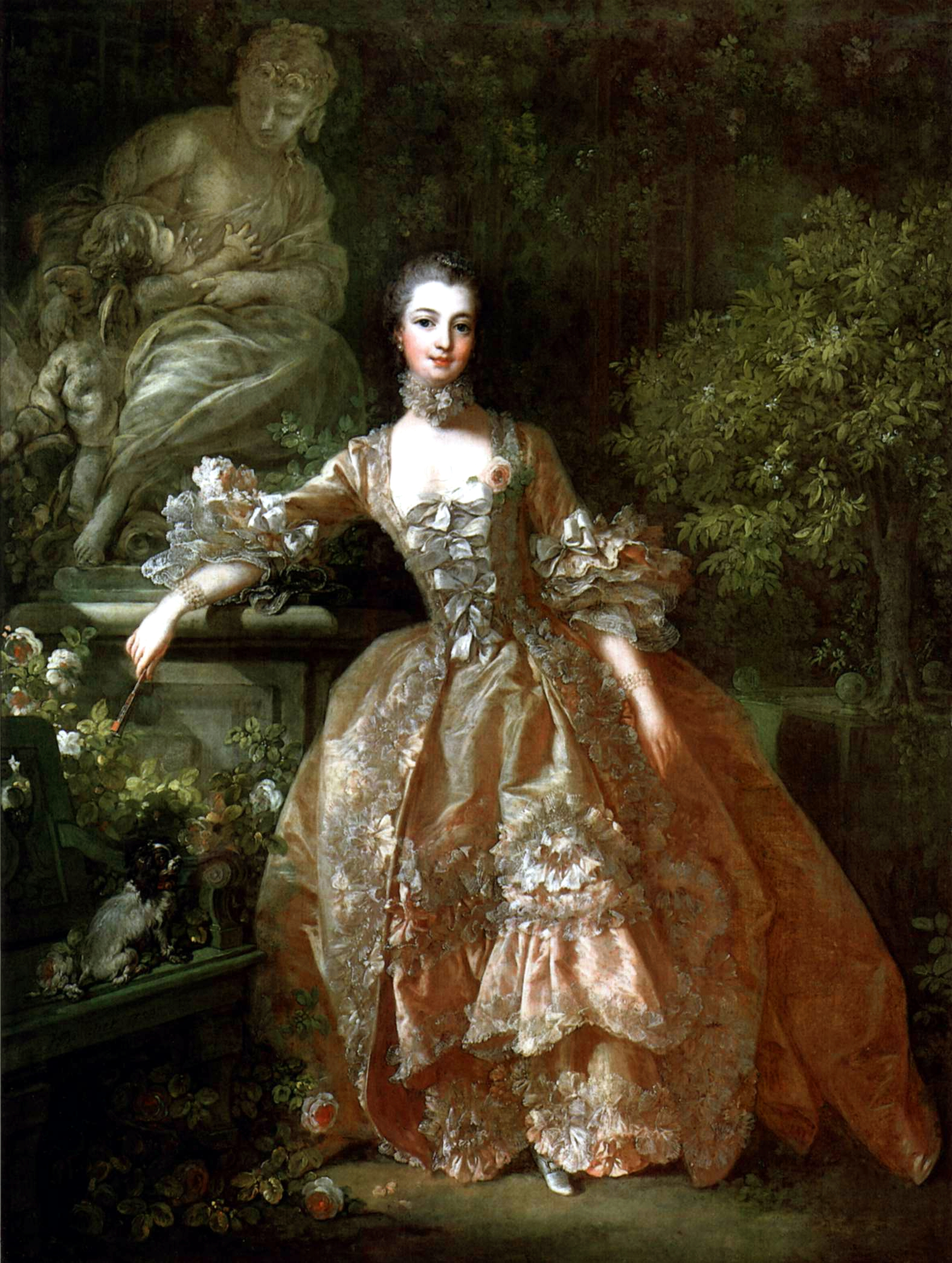
Mme de Pompadour by François Boucher.

With the death of the marquise de Pompadour in 1764, the château passed to her brother, Abel-François Poisson de Vandières, marquis de Marigny, and general director of the Bâtiments du Roi. Some new work was then realized under the direction of architect Jacques-Germain Soufflot: the side court, and the main building were doubled and the ground floor covered à l'italienne, while the wings built by Gabriel were equipped with pitched slate roofs à la française.

After 1830, Joseph, prince de Caraman-Chimay established at the Château de Menars an establishment he called the "prytanée" which aims to bring together young people of different conditions and nationalities to give them a common education. To this effect, he built a vast establishment to the east of the forecourt, which partly survives, as well as a small gas works to provide coal and gas to the college.

== Architecture ==
In spite of the successive additions, the Château de Menars preserves a simplicity of planning and of construction, with a certain austerity reflecting the original spirit of the châteaux of the seventeenth century. The later additions are still perfectly readable, with the central body and its two pavilions between which the parts added by Marigny fit and beyond which the two wings created by Gabriel extend.

The corps de logis on the ground floor presents a large gallery nowadays, created in 1912 by combining three spaces. The main building still presents three large parts - the old hall in the center, room with a dais on the left and salon for company on the right - ornate woodwork designed by Gabriel as well as chimneypieces surmounted with mirrors. The staircase of stone, as well as the unusual dado of mahogany in the library on the first floor, date from the transformations effected by the Marquis de Marigny.

== Gardens ==
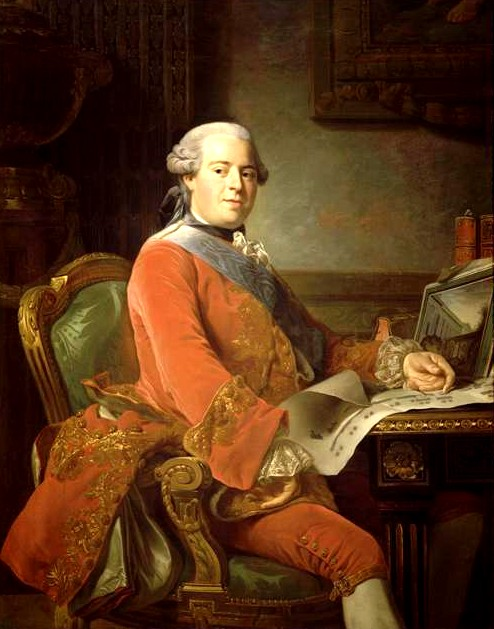
Marquis de Marigny by Alexandre Roslin

Jean-Jacques Cartwright, in the second half of the seventeenth century, arranged a formal garden with parterres, turf boulingrins, a canal with other bodies of water, and two planted avenues "of elms in four rows, one of six hundred toises and the others of four hundred" whence the view contains the Loire and the surrounding countryside.

During Marigny's tenure, an English garden was created in the Bois-Bas, with a small ravine located to the west, in which Marigny planted thickets of various diverse trees, sheltering cabinets of trellis work. One of them contained a famous hydraulic machine, conceived by the mechanic Loriot. At the edge of the Loire, a Désert was arranged in an old sand pit and was decorated as an artificial grotto.

Marigny devoted all his care to the installation of the park for the presentation of its prestigious collection of sculptures. In front of the château, in place of the former parterres, he created a broad terrace. He remade the gardens in the style of his day while commissioning many garden follies.

At the foot of the château, the "Rotunda of Abundance", built by Soufflot, permits passage from the basement of the château to the interior of the orangery. It originally housed a statue of Abundance by Lambert-Sigisbert Adam the elder, which was replaced with a Louis XV by Nicolas Coustou, which has now been replaced by a copy of Medici Venus by Jean-Jacques Clérion.

Towards the east, the terrace ends in a roundabout where Marigny built a kiosk in the Chinese manner designed by Charles De Wailly. Between the terrace and the road, are ordered a series of hedges, trellises, outdoor rooms of greenery as well as a kitchen garden. Below, around a small fountain, Soufflot created a magnificent nymphaeum with Serlian windows on the façade and, inside, the use of the Doric order reveals an Italianate inspiration.
