= Abel-François Poisson =

French Marquess (1727–1781)

Abel-François Poisson de Vandières
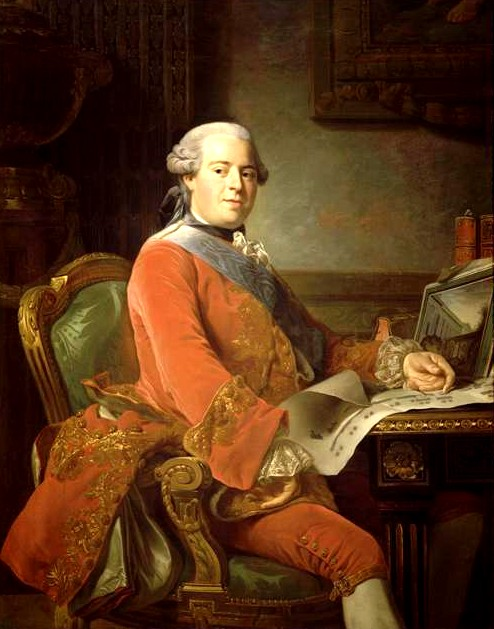
- The marquis de Marigny. Portrait by Alexander Roslin, 1764. Château de Versailles.

Directeur-général des Bâtiments du Roi
- In office 1751–1773
- Preceded by: Charles François Paul Le Normant de Tournehem
- Succeeded by: Joseph Marie Terray

Personal details
- Born: 1727 Paris
- Died: 12 May 1781 Paris

Abel-François Poisson de Vandières, marquis de Marigny (French pronunciation: [abɛl fʁɑ̃swa pwasɔ̃ də vɑ̃djɛʁ maʁki də maʁiɲi]) and marquis de Menars (1727 – 12 May 1781), often referred to simply as marquis de Marigny, was a French nobleman who served as the director general of the King's Buildings. He was the brother of King Louis XV's influential mistress Madame de Pompadour.

== Early life ==
Non-noble by birth, Abel-François Poisson de Vandières was raised in a family of Parisian financiers. When his elder sister, Jeanne-Antoinette Poisson became, in 1745, the official mistress of Louis XV and was given the title "marquise de Pompadour", she had him follow her to the court, where the young man attracted the favours of the king. When Philibert Orry retired, the king arranged for Abel-François Poisson de Vandières - then aged 18 - to inherit the direction of the Bâtiments du Roi ("direction générale des Bâtiments, Arts, Jardins et Manufactures"), while Charles François Paul Le Normant de Tournehem, believed to be the marquise de Pompadour's biological father, was named as Orry's immediate successor.

Charles Antoine Coypel, first painter to the king, was given the responsibility of training and educating the young Abel-François Poisson de Vandières. With Coypel's help, Poisson de Vandières chose paintings from the royal collection for exhibition at the Palais du Luxembourg, thus creating the first museum in France.

Between December 1749 and September 1751, he spent twenty-five months in Italy, staying first at the Académie de France à Rome, and then travelling (the so-called "Grand Tour") across the country with the engraver Charles Nicolas Cochin, the architect Jacques-Germain Soufflot and the abbé Leblanc. This trip would have important repercussions on the development of arts and artistic taste in France.

== Work in the Palace ==
At the death of Le Normant de Tournehem in 1751, Poisson de Vandières was called back from Italy and took over his functions as "directeur-général des Bâtiments du Roi" (director general of the King's Buildings). He kept this position until his retirement in 1773, thereby setting a record for the longest administrative service in the 18th century in France.

Irritable, boastful, easily angered, insecure about his humble origins, Marigny was nevertheless an intelligent and energetic administrator concerned with the importance of his work. He encouraged history painting and, in architecture, the return to classical sources, which would become French neoclassicism. He sponsored the architect Soufflot, whom he chose for the construction of the new Église Sainte-Geneviève (today the "Panthéon"), a major work in the neoclassical style. He gave oversight of the construction of the new Théâtre-Français (today the Théâtre de l'Odéon) to Charles de Wailly and Marie-Joseph Peyre. He directed the construction of the Place Louis XV (today the Place de la Concorde), the planting of the gardens of the Champs-Élysées, and supervised the construction of the École Militaire. He gave numerous commissions to François Boucher, Charles-Amédée-Philippe van Loo, Jean-Baptiste Pierre and named Charles-Joseph Natoire as director of the Académie de France à Rome.

== As Marquis de Marigny ==
Having inherited from his father in 1754 the château of Marigny-en-Orxois, near Château-Thierry, he became the same year marquis de Marigny.

In 1767, he married Marie Françoise Julie Constance Filleul (1751–1822), the illegitimate daughter of Louis XV and Irène du Buisson de Longpré, with whom he had a daughter who died young.

The marquis de Marigny amassed an important collection of works of art at his various residences.

Although he suffered severely from gout, the marquis de Marigny died unexpectedly in 1781 at Paris, leaving no will.

== Residences ==
- 1752-1778: Hôtel de Marigny, built in 1640, rue Saint-Thomas-du-Louvre (demolished, the site today is the corner of the Richelieu wing of the Louvre and the north-east corner of the "pyramide du Louvre"). The Direction générale des Bâtiments was located there until 1773.
- 1778-1781: Hôtel de Massiac, Place des Victoires, built in 1635.
- 1754-1781: Château of Marigny-en-Orxois, a renovated medieval castle.
- 1759-1773: Hôtel de Marigny, faubourg du Roule, Paris. Bought from Louis Philippe I, Duke of Orléans. Redesigned in 1768–1771 by Jacques-Germain Soufflot who constructed the western façade in a Palladian style.
- 1764-1781: Château de Menars in Menars (Loir-et-Cher), inherited from his sister, the marquise de Pompadour.
- Pavillon Le Pâté in Bercy, south-east of Paris, built in 1720.
