= Charles Guillaume Le Normant d'Étiolles =

French noble (1717–1799)

Charles-Guillaume Le Normant d'Étiolles (8 May 1717 – 18 March 1799) was a French aristocrat, best known as being the husband of Madame de Pompadour or Jeanne-Antoinette Poisson, the illustrious mistress of King Louis XV.

== Life ==
A scion of a family of officials from Orléans, his father was Hervé-Guillaume Le Normant du Fort, trésorier général des Monnaies. His uncle was the financier Le Normant de Tournehem in 1741, a tax farmer and legal guardian of Jeanne-Antoinette Poisson. By arrangement of his uncle, Le Normant d'Étiolles married Madame de Pompadour in 1741. He also followed his uncle as a financier.

The couple had two children, a boy in 1741, who died the year following his birth, and a daughter, Alexandrine-Jeanne d'Étiolles, nicknamed "Fanfan", born on 10 August 1744. She died in June 1754 at the age of 9 years old from a stomach ailment, possibly peritonitis.

In June 1745, Louis XV, who had taken a particular liking to Madame de Pompadour, (1721 –1764) arranged for her to become his official mistress, a position she came by with the blessing of her husband's father. Louis XV offered Le Normant the position of ambassador to the Ottoman Empire, to remove him from the scene, but he refused. Louis then arranged a legal separation of Madame de Pompadour from her husband. He was devastated and never forgave his wife for her treachery. He consoled himself with affairs with other women in Paris, having several children. After Pompadour's death, he discreetly married Marie-Aimée Maltha, formerly a dancer and the mother of his children, and they lived quietly at the manoir de Baillon, near the Royaumont Abbey.

He and his new wife were detained for over a year in the Reign of Terror. Later released, Charles-Guillaume died peacefully in his home on the rue du Sentier.
