= Couvent des Capucines =

Former convent in Paris, France

Coordinates: 48.868°N 2.330°E

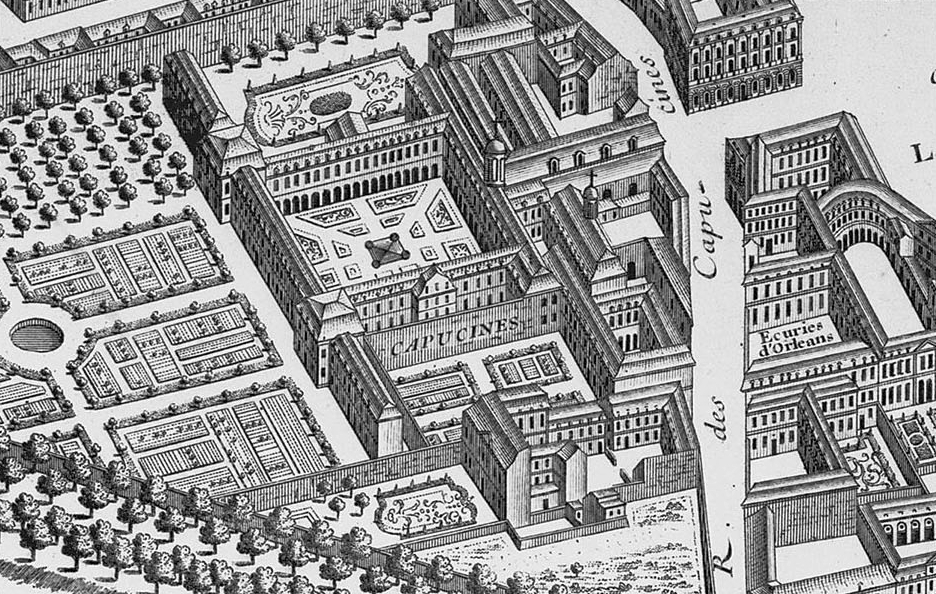
- The Couvent des Capucines shown in the Turgot map of Paris, 1739.

Religion
- Affiliation: Roman Catholic

Location
- Municipality: Paris
- Country: France
- Interactive map of Couvent des Capucines

Architecture
- Groundbreaking: 1604
- Completed: 1606
- Destroyed: 1806

The Couvent des Capucines (Convent of the Capucins) is a former convent of the Order of the Capuchin Poor Clares, located in Paris on the site of the current Place Vendôme. The convent was built by Marie de Luxembourg, Duchess of Mercœur. It was destroyed in 1806.

== History ==
=== The Old Convent ===
The Order of the Capuchin Poor Clares was introduced to France by Queen Louise de Lorraine-Vaudémont, who wanted to create a convent in Bourges to be buried at. Upon her death on January 29, 1601, she bequeathed to her brother, Philippe Emmanuel, Duke of Mercœur, a sum of 60,000 livre tournois to build it; however, he died in February of 1602.

By letters patent on June 8, 1602, Henry IV authorized the widow of the Duke of Mercœur, Marie de Luxembourg, to build a Capuchin convent, but in Paris instead of Bourges. In September of 1603, Pope Paul V accredited the creation in Paris of the convent, under the name of the Daughters of the Passion. Marie de Luxembourg decided to settle the nuns in the Hôtel du Perron, also known as the Hôtel de Retz, on the Rue du Faubourg Saint-Honoré. Marie de Luxembourg purchased the Hôtel du Perron with the help of her brother-in-law, Henri, Duke of Joyeuse. Construction work on the convent began on June 29, 1604. The chapel was inaugurated in June 1606.

At the time, the Couvent des Capucines occupied half of the current Place Vendôme. When the Place Vendôme was built in the 1690s, the original convent was destroyed.

=== The New Convent ===
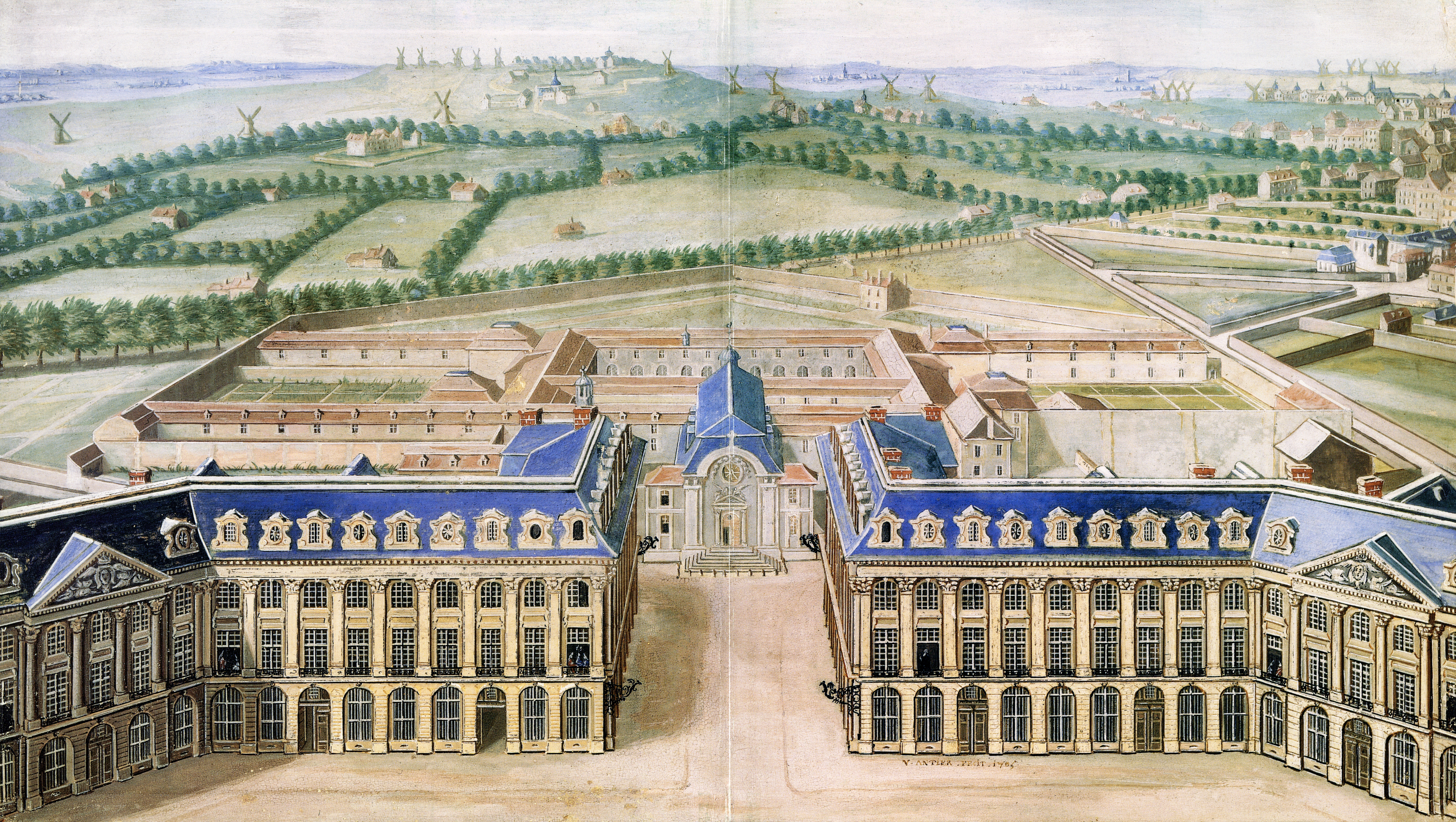
1705 painting of the place Louis-le-Grand (Place Vendôme) looking north towards the Couvent des Capucines.

Louis XIV offered the nuns to rebuild a new convent at his own expense. The plan for the facade of the new convent was designed by the King's architect, Jules Hardouin-Mansart, and provided on April 6, 1686. The remainder of the plan was designed by François d'Orbay. The foreground of the plan, however, was quickly changed to take into account the building's perspective within the new square, and in particular with the portal of the Couvent des Feuillants that was built on the opposite side of the square. The first stone was laid on July 9, 1686, and the nuns settled there on July 2, 1688. The new church was dedicated to Saint Louis on August 27, 1689.

Jean Jouvenet (1644-1717) painted The Descent from the Cross in 1697 for the main altar of the Capuchin church. In 1756, the painting was donated to the Académie Royale de Peinture et de Sculpture. Seized during the French Revolution along with all other paintings held by the Académie, it was moved to the Louvre where it is still to be found.

When rebuilding the convent, François-Michel le Tellier, Marquis de Louvois had required that the contractor Maurice II Gabriel (1632-1693) reuse the materials of the old building. By 1720, the portal of the church was already heavily degraded, likely due to Louvois' choice to build the convent on plaster rubble. The portal was rebuilt in 1721 and 1722 on the plans of Sébastien-Antoine Slodtz (1695-1754) with sculptures by François-Antoine Vassé (1681-1736). The portal needed to be restored again in 1755.

After the suppression of regular orders by the National Constituent Assembly in 1789, the sisters left the convent on June 14, 1790. By a decree on September 7, 1792, the convent became the Hôtel des Monnaies and was used to print Assignats. Physicist and stage magician Étienne-Gaspard Robert presented fantasized shows in the old church using a magic lantern called a fantascope. In 1800, Antonio Franconi's circus occupied the former convent.

The Couvent des Capucines was destroyed under the First Empire in 1806 for the drilling of a new avenue named after Napoleon. Under the Restoration, it became the Rue de la Paix.

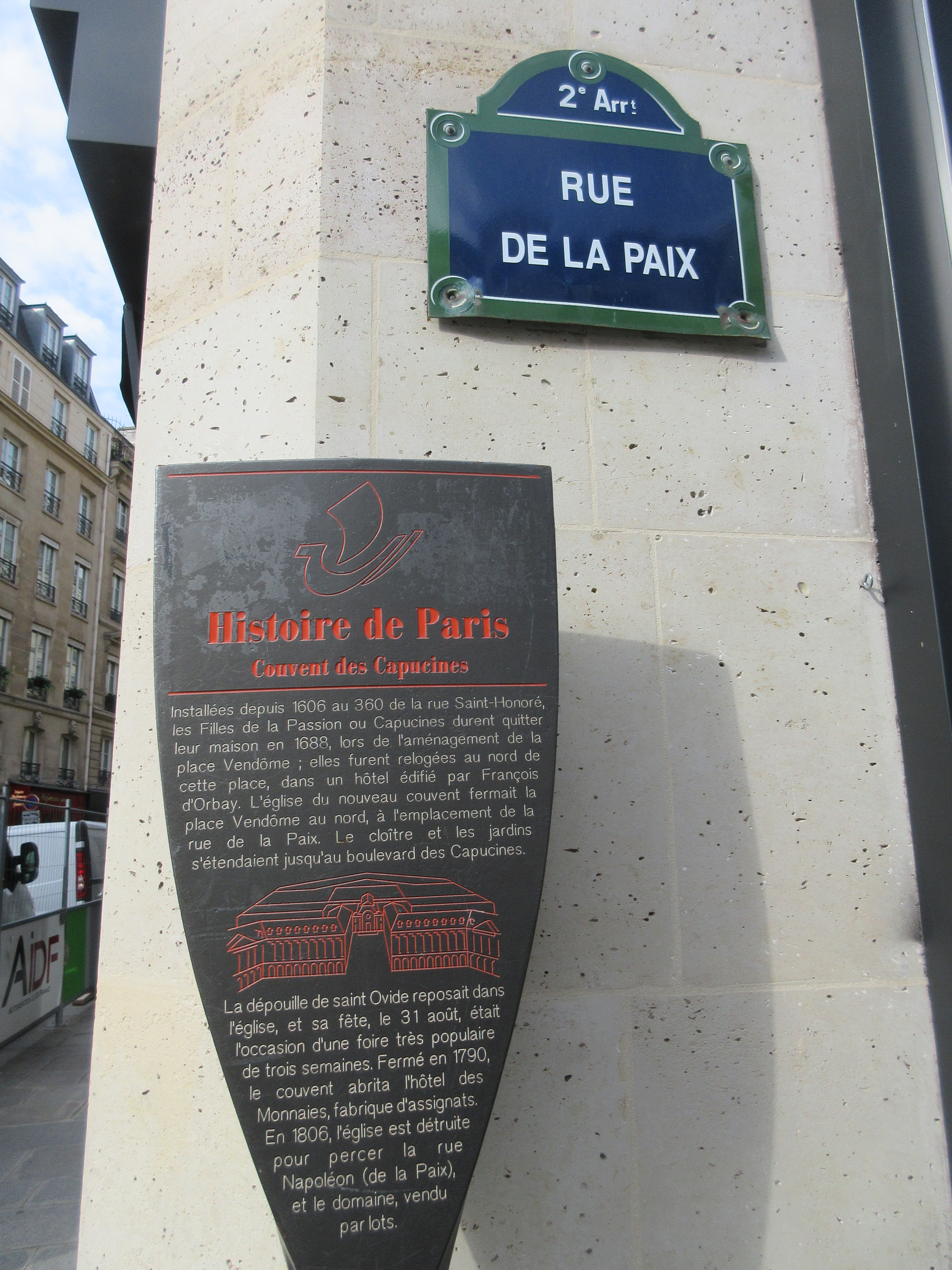
Historical marker for the Couvent des Capucines on the Rue de la Paix.

== People buried in the Couvent des Capucines ==
- Charles III de Créquy (1624-1687);
- Charles de Lorraine, Count of Armagnac (1684-1751);
- Marie Madeleine Méliand (1704-1781), widow of René Louis de Voyer de Paulmy d'Argenson;
- Madame de Pompadour (1721-1764).

== Bibliography ==
- (fr) This article is partially or entirely translated from fr:Couvent des Capucines; see its history for attribution.
- Raoul de Sceaux, "The Capuchin Convent on Rue Saint-Honoré in Paris: Topographical and Historical Study", Yearbook 1971-1972, École pratique des hautes études. 4th section, Historical and Philological Sciences, 1972, p. 787-796.
- Ania Guini-Skliar, "The Capuchin Convent" in Place Vendôme. Art, power and fortune, Delegation to the artistic action of the City of Paris, Paris, 2002, p. 63-68.
