= Charles François Paul Le Normant de Tournehem =

French businessman and tax farmer (1684-1751)

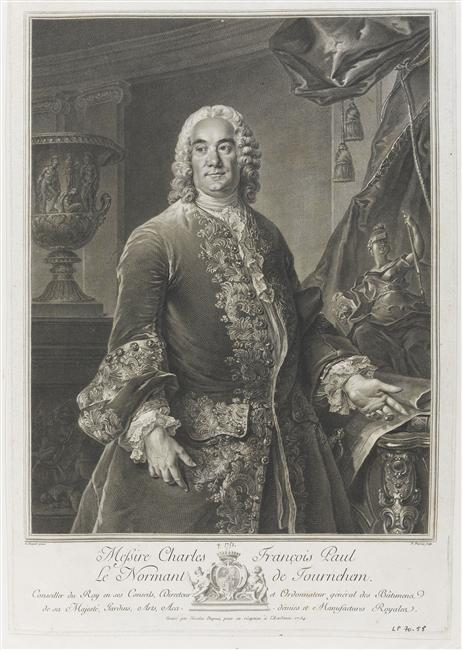
Le Normant de Tournehem, engraving after his portrait by Louis Tocqué; the Medici Vase looms in the background

Charles François Paul Le Normant de Tournehem (30 December 1684– 27 November 1751) was a French financier, a fermier-général, or tax-farmer.

He is best known for his connection with Jeanne-Antoinette Poisson (1721–1764), future marquise de Pompadour. Her legal guardian from 1725, after her official father was forced to leave the country, he may have been her natural father. He raised her and educated her with care, and he married her in 1741 to his nephew, Charles-Guillaume Le Normant d'Étiolles, from whom she was separated in 1745 at the request of Louis XV.

Thanks to the influence of Madame de Pompadour, Le Normant de Tournehem was made directeur général of the Bâtiments du Roi in December 1745, succeeding Philibert Orry. He held this post, overseeing royal building works, until his death. "Without artistic prejudices," Fiske Kimball observed, "he was a man of ability, honesty and simplicity, who devoted himself to efficient administration." Le Normant de Tournehem reinstated the post of premier peintre du Roi which had been allowed to lapse, in favour of Charles-Antoine Coypel, upon whose artistic advice he wisely depended. Coypel's own advisors were the comte de Caylus, the brilliant and tireless antiquary and founder of archaeology, who had been an advisor to Orry and was a close friend of the connoisseur Pierre-Jean Mariette, and Abbé Leblanc, an early critic of the excesses of the Rococo and an advocate of a chastened simplicity in the arts of design. In his role of director of the Bâtiments du Roi, Le Normant de Tournehem oversaw the design and construction of the Château de Bellevue, which served as a discreet meeting ground for Madame de Pompadour and the King.

At his death, his successor at the Bâtiments du Roi was Pompadour's capable and carefully prepared brother, Abel-François Poisson, marquis de Vandières, soon to be awarded the title by which posterity knows him, the Marquis de Marigny.
