= Menars =

- Commune
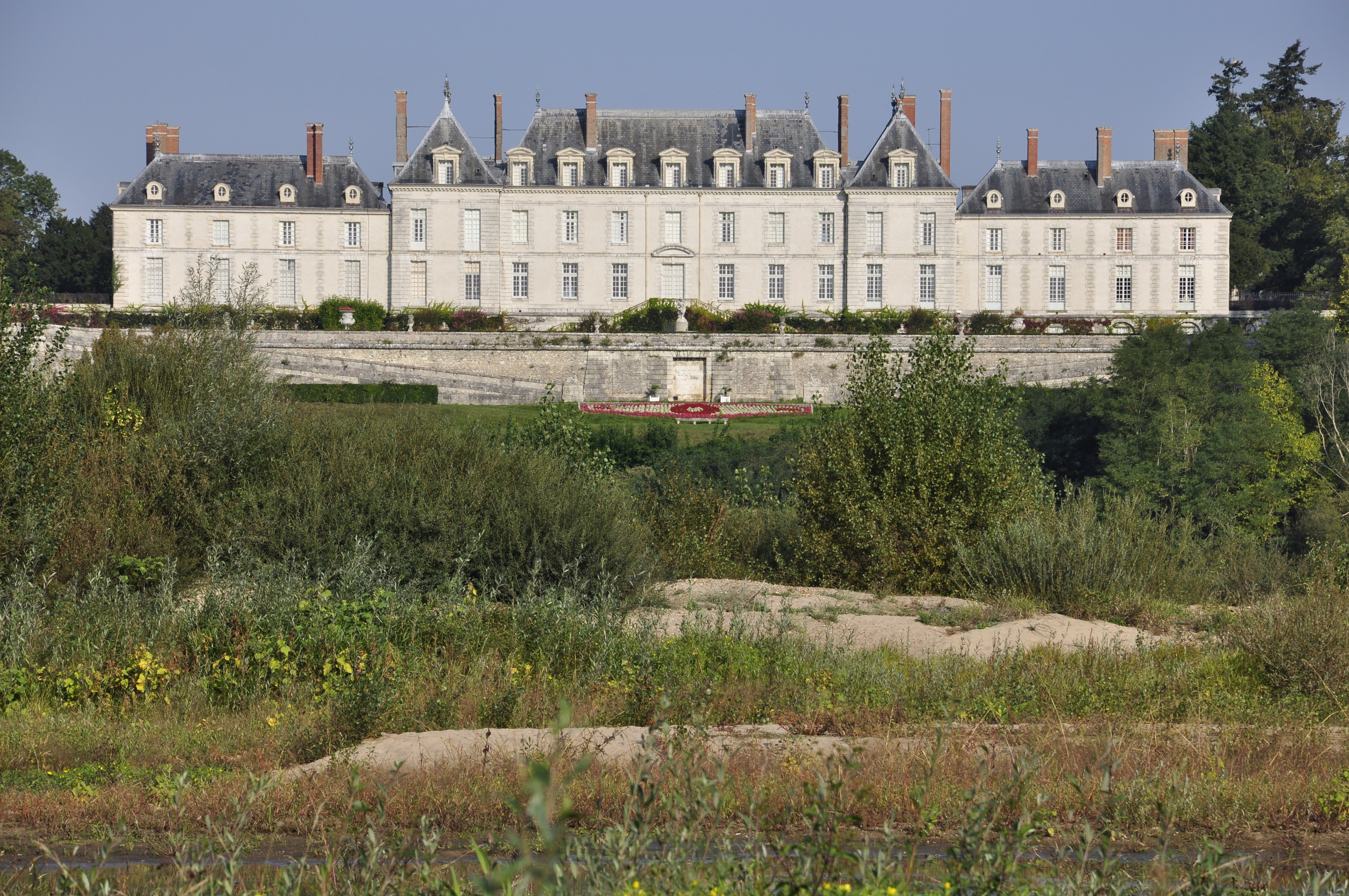
- Château of Menars

- Coat of arms
- Location of Menars
- Location within France Location within Centre-Val de Loire
- Coordinates: 47°38′36″N 1°24′34″E
- Country: France
- Region: Centre-Val de Loire
- Department: Loir-et-Cher
- Arrondissement: Blois
- Canton: Blois-2
- Intercommunality: CA Blois Agglopolys

Government
  - Mayor (2020–2026): Serge Touzelet
- Area^{1}: 4.5 km^{2} (1.7 sq mi)
- Elevation: 98 m (322 ft)
- Highest elevation: 111 m (364 ft)
- Lowest elevation: 67 m (220 ft)
- Population (2023): 609
  - Density: 140/km^{2} (350/sq mi)
- Time zone: UTC+01:00 (CET)
  - Summer (DST): UTC+02:00 (CEST)
- INSEE/Postal code: 41134 /41500
- ^{1} French Land Register data, which excludes lakes, ponds, glaciers > 1 km^{2} (0.386 sq mi or 247 acres) and river estuaries.

Menars (French pronunciation: [menaʁ]), also spelled Ménars, is a commune and town in the French department of Loir-et-Cher, Centre-Val de Loire, France. The Château de Menars, formerly owned by Madame de Pompadour, is located here.

== Population ==
Historical population
Year	Pop.	±% p.a.
1968	431	—
1975	474	+1.37%
1982	550	+2.15%
1990	551	+0.02%
1999	574	+0.46%
2007	606	+0.68%
2012	612	+0.20%
2017	626	+0.45%
2023	609	−0.46%
Source: INSEE

== See also ==
- Communes of the Loir-et-Cher department
- Château de Menars
