= Marigny-en-Orxois =

- Commune
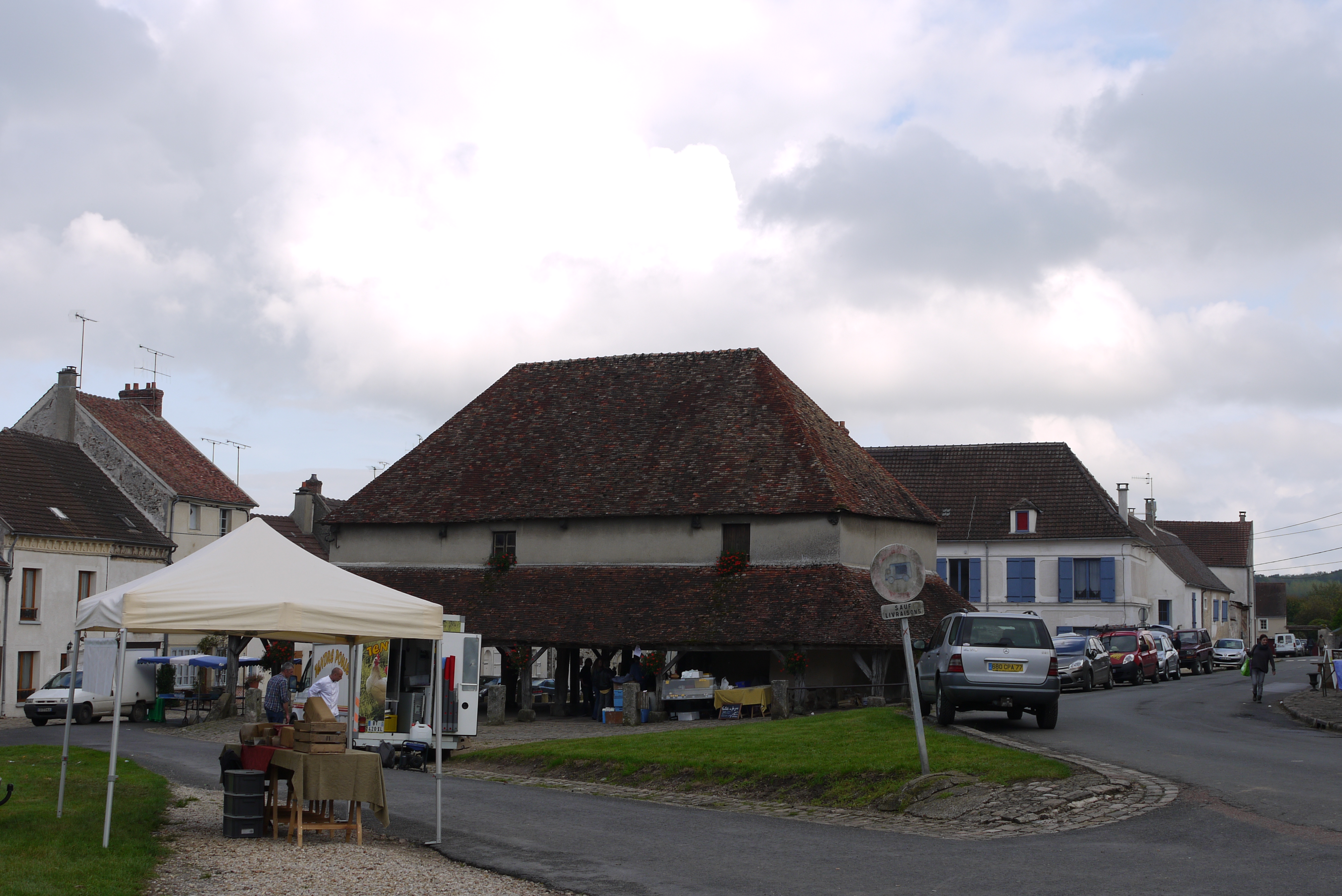
- The market hall of Marigny-en-Orxois

- Coat of arms
- Location of Marigny-en-Orxois
- Location within France Location within Hauts-de-France
- Coordinates: 49°03′41″N 3°13′40″E
- Country: France
- Region: Hauts-de-France
- Department: Aisne
- Arrondissement: Château-Thierry
- Canton: Essômes-sur-Marne
- Intercommunality: Charly sur Marne

Government
  - Mayor (2026–32): Philippe Marchal
- Area^{1}: 15.56 km^{2} (6.01 sq mi)
- Highest elevation: 216 m (709 ft)
- Lowest elevation: 84 m (276 ft)
- Population (2023): 530
  - Density: 34/km^{2} (88/sq mi)
- Time zone: UTC+01:00 (CET)
  - Summer (DST): UTC+02:00 (CEST)
- INSEE/Postal code: 02465 /02810
- ^{1} French Land Register data, which excludes lakes, ponds, glaciers > 1 km^{2} (0.386 sq mi or 247 acres) and river estuaries.

Marigny-en-Orxois (French pronunciation: [maʁiɲi ɑ̃.n‿ɔʁswa]) is a commune in the Aisne department in Hauts-de-France in northern France.

== Population ==
Historical population
| Year | Pop. | ±% p.a. |
|---|---|---|
| 1968 | 330 | — |
| 1975 | 318 | −0.53% |
| 1982 | 275 | −2.05% |
| 1990 | 337 | +2.57% |
| 1999 | 416 | +2.37% |
| 2007 | 469 | +1.51% |
| 2012 | 471 | +0.09% |
| 2017 | 485 | +0.59% |
| 2023 | 530 | +1.49% |
Source: INSEE

== See also ==
- Communes of the Aisne department
