= Château de Bellevue =

Former castle in Meudon, France

Coordinates: 48°49′19″N 2°13′40″E

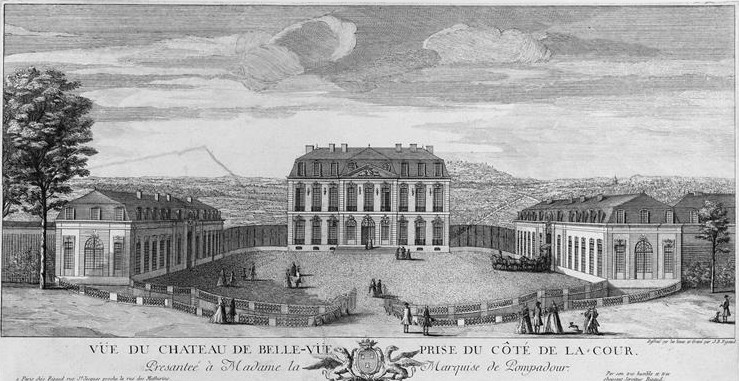
The Château de Bellevue, in the time of Madame de Pompadour, from the courtyard to the west

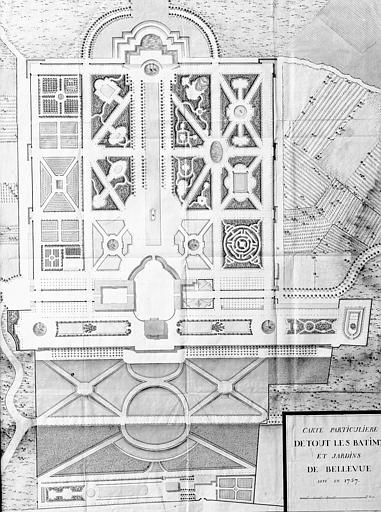
The park surrounding the Château de Bellevue (west at the top)

The Château de Bellevue (French: [ʃɑto d(ə) bɛlvy]; "Castle of Bellevue") was a small château built for Madame de Pompadour in 1750. It was constructed on a broad plateau in Meudon, above a slope overlooking the Seine to the east, but was demolished in 1823 and little remains.

== History ==
At the instigation of Louis XV, Charles François Paul Le Normant de Tournehem, directeur général of the Bâtiments du Roi, negotiated the purchase of the land from its various owners, located between the royal châteaux at Meudon and Saint-Cloud. Ange-Jacques Gabriel, Premier architecte du Roi, proposed the construction of a pleasure house to be named "Bellevue", referring to its views over the Seine.

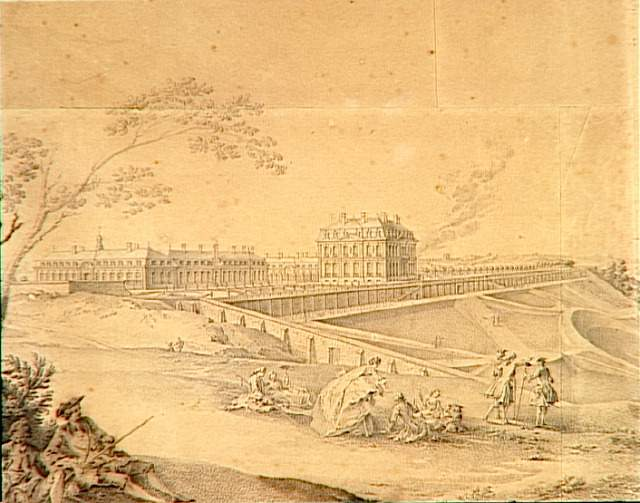
The Château de Bellevue from the South. 18th drawing by Jacques André Portail.

In 1749, Louis gave the land to Madame de Pompadour, who delegated the building to her architect, Jean Cailleteau (called "Lassurance the younger"), assisted in the gardens by Jean-Charles Garnier d'Isle. The work was quickly completed, despite the need for deep foundations. 800 workmen were employed, often with Louis in attendance, and the building was completed in 1750.

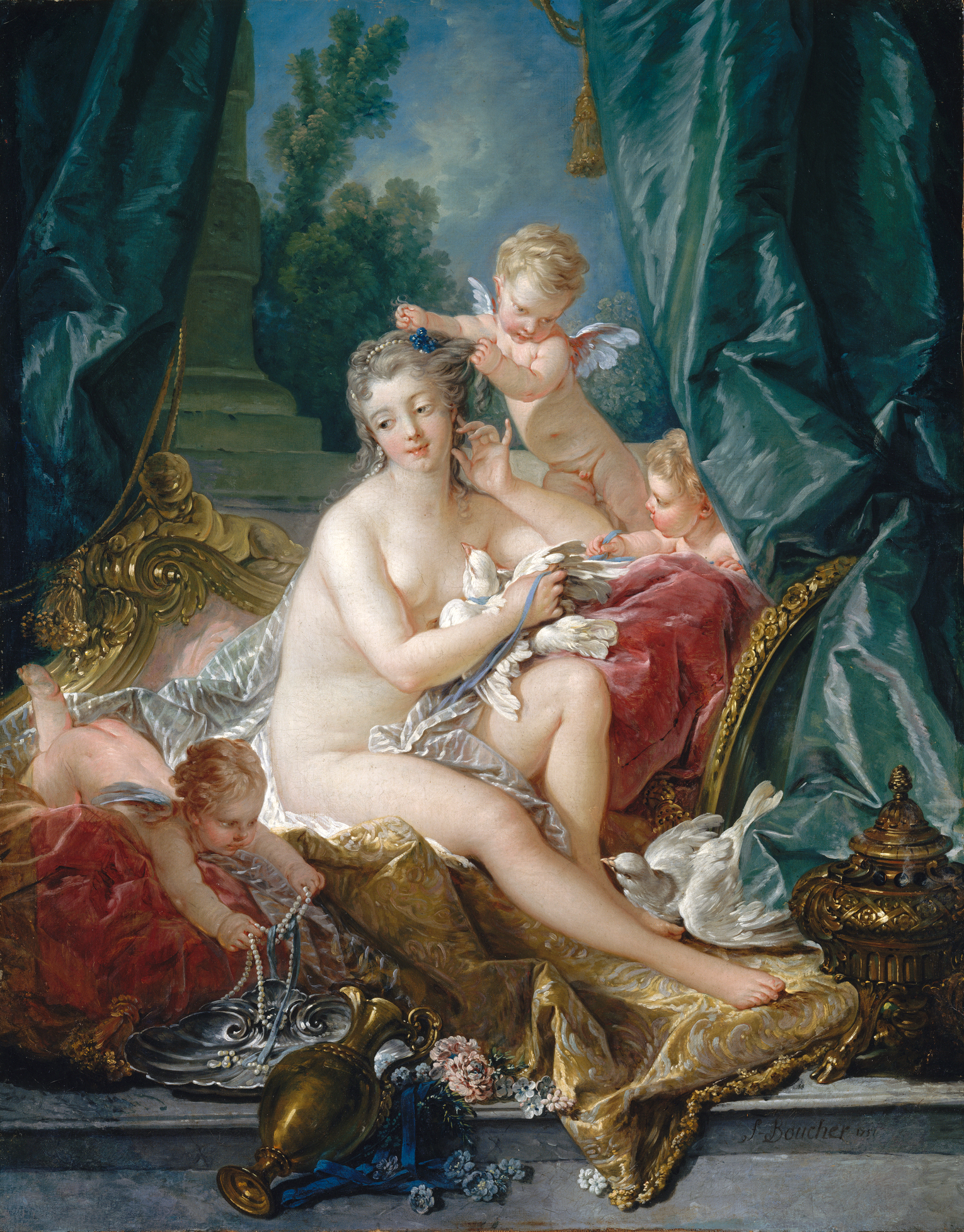
La Toilette de Vénus (1751) by François Boucher (Metropolitan Museum of Art, New York)

Madame de Pompadour commissioned François Boucher to paint La Toilette de Vénus for her dressing room at Bellevue. Pompadour was Boucher's patroness from 1747 until her death in 1764.

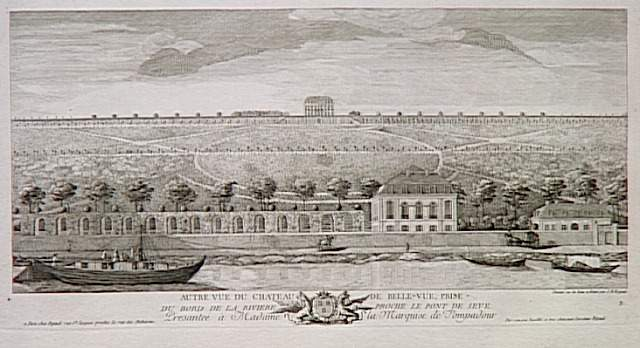
Brimborion beside the Seine (below right) and the Château de Bellevue (above centre)

The Château de Bellevue is an important step in the evolution of the French château. It was a relatively modest building, more like a house of a rich nobleman than a royal château, reflecting its role as an intimate meeting place for King Louis and Madame de Pompadour. The building was almost square, with nine bays to the front and six on the sides. It had two storeys, in a form typical of the fashionable "country cottages", such as those at the Petit Trianon. Each façade was surmounted by a simply triangular pediment, decorated in high relief. Busts were placed between the bays on the first floor, mostly of Roman emperors. Due to the small size of the main building, small buildings around a courtyard to the west contained the domestic services. A substantial formal parterre was laid out to the west, with walks down the slope to Brimborion on the banks of the Seine to the east.

In 1750, Madame de Pompadour acquired a small building at the bottom of the slope, on the banks of the Seine, called Brimborion (French: trinket), which was linked to the new residence through its gardens.

After the King and Madame de Pompadour grew apart, Louis repurchased it in 1757 and had it redesigned by Ange-Jacques Gabriel, adding two wings linked to the main building. After the death of King Louis XV in 1774, the château was transferred to his daughters, Madame Marie Adélaïde, Madame Victoire and Madame Sophie. They redesigned the interior again, and created a jardin anglais orné at Brimborion, similar to Chantilly or Trianon.

The owners departed in 1791 during the French Revolution. The château was demolished in 1823 at the instigation of Achille Guillaume, and new buildings were built on the site. The last remains of the château disappeared in the 20th century, except the ice house and parts of the terrace.

== Bibliography ==
- Christian Bisch, Meudon-Bellevue, 1750-2000 : du château de la marquise de Pompadour aux laboratoires du CNRS, Presses du CNRS.
- Paul Biver, Histoire du château de Bellevue, Paris, Enault, 1933.
- Jean-Marie Pérouse de Montclos (dir.), Guide du patrimoine Île-de-France, Paris, Hachette, 1992.
- F. and M.-J. Villadier, Bellevue, deux siècles d'histoire, Meudon, s.d.
