= Madame de Pompadour =

Chief mistress of Louis XV (1721–1764)

Jeanne Antoinette
- Marquise of Pompadour
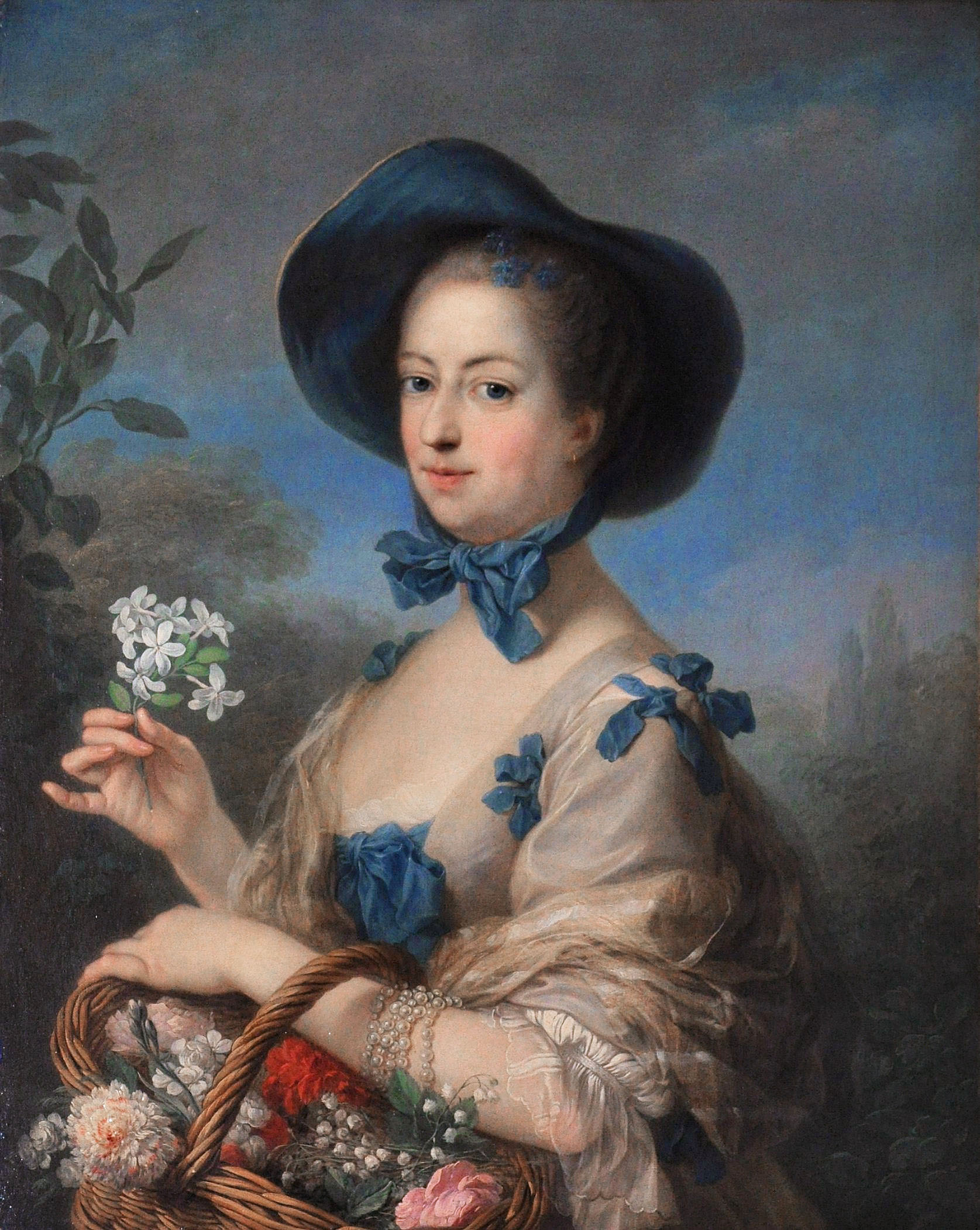
- Portrait by Charles-André van Loo, c. 1755
- Full name: Jeanne Antoinette Poisson
- Born: 29 December 1721; Paris, Kingdom of France
- Died: 15 April 1764 (aged 42); Paris, Kingdom of France
- Buried: Couvent des Capucines
- Spouse: Charles Guillaume le Normant d'Étiolles (m. 1741)
- Issue: Charles Guillaume Louis (1741–42); Alexandrine Jeanne (1744–1754)
- Father: François Poisson
- Mother: Madeleine de La Motte
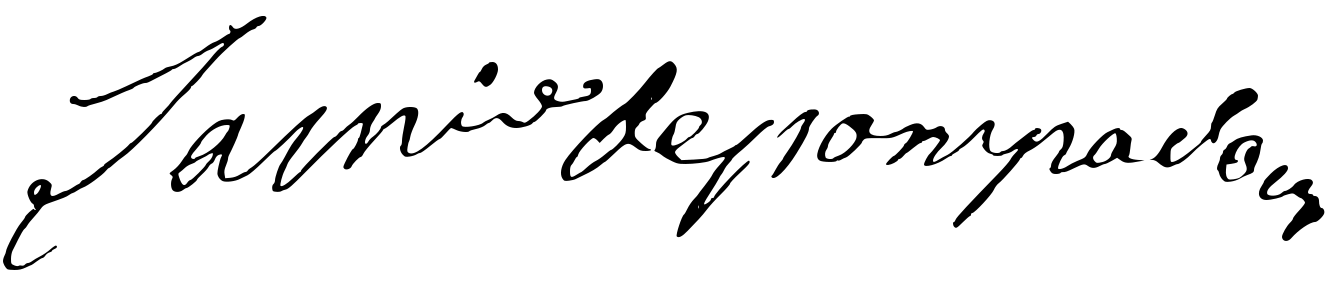
- Signature
- Occupation: Chief mistress of Louis XV

Jeanne Antoinette Poisson, Marquise de Pompadour (/ˈpɒmpədʊər/, French: [pɔ̃paduʁ]; 29 December 1721 – 15 April 1764), commonly known as Madame de Pompadour, was a member of the French court. She was the official chief mistress of King Louis XV from 1745 to 1751, and remained influential as court favourite until her death.

Pompadour took charge of the king's schedule and was a valued aide and advisor, despite her frail health and many political enemies. She secured titles of nobility for herself and her relatives, and built a network of clients and supporters. She was particularly careful not to alienate the popular Queen, Marie Leszczyńska. On 8 February 1756, the Marquise de Pompadour was named as the thirteenth lady-in-waiting to the queen, a position considered the most prestigious at the court, which accorded her honors.

Pompadour was a major patron of architecture and decorative arts, especially porcelain. She was a patron of the philosophes of the Enlightenment, including Voltaire.

Hostile critics at the time generally tarred her as a malevolent political influence, but historians are more favorable, emphasizing her successes as a patron of the arts and a champion of French pride. Modern historians suggest that the critics of Pompadour were driven by fears over the overturning of the existing hierarchies that Pompadour's power and influence represented, as a woman who was not born into the aristocracy.

== Early life ==
Jeanne Antoinette Poisson was born on 29 December 1721 in Paris to François Poisson (1684–1754) and his wife Madeleine de La Motte (1699–1745). Her father François Poisson was the youngest of nine children in the family of a weaver Claude Poisson (1631–1694) and his wife Marie Maranjé (1637–1707). Poisson was steward to the Paris brothers, the men primarily responsible for financing the French economy at the time. It is suspected that her biological father was either the rich financier Jean Pâris de Monmartel or the tax collector (fermier général) Charles François Paul Le Normant de Tournehem. Le Normant de Tournehem became her legal guardian when François Poisson was forced to leave the country in 1725 after a scandal over a series of unpaid debts. Such a crime at that time was punishable by death; however, he was cleared eight years later and allowed to return to France.

At the age of five, Jeanne Antoinette was sent to receive the finest quality education of the day in an Ursuline convent in Poissy, where she gained admiration for her wit and charm. Due to poor health, thought to be whooping cough, Jeanne Antoinette returned home in January 1730, aged 9. Madeleine refused to allow this to prevent her daughter from becoming a highly educated and accomplished young lady, enrolling Jeanne Antoinette in private tutoring upon her return to Paris. Charles François Paul Le Normant de Tournehem took charge of the child's education, sparing no expense. Jeanne-Antoinette was "coached in elocution by an actor from the Comedie Francaise and the dramatist Crebillon. The opera singer Jélyotte taught her to sing", along with extensive education in the humanities, fine arts, music, and social finery. During this time, her mother took her to a fortuneteller, Madame de Lebon, who predicted that the girl would one day reign over the heart of a king. Pompadour left the fortuneteller 600 livres in her will, for correctly predicting the impossible.

== Marriage ==
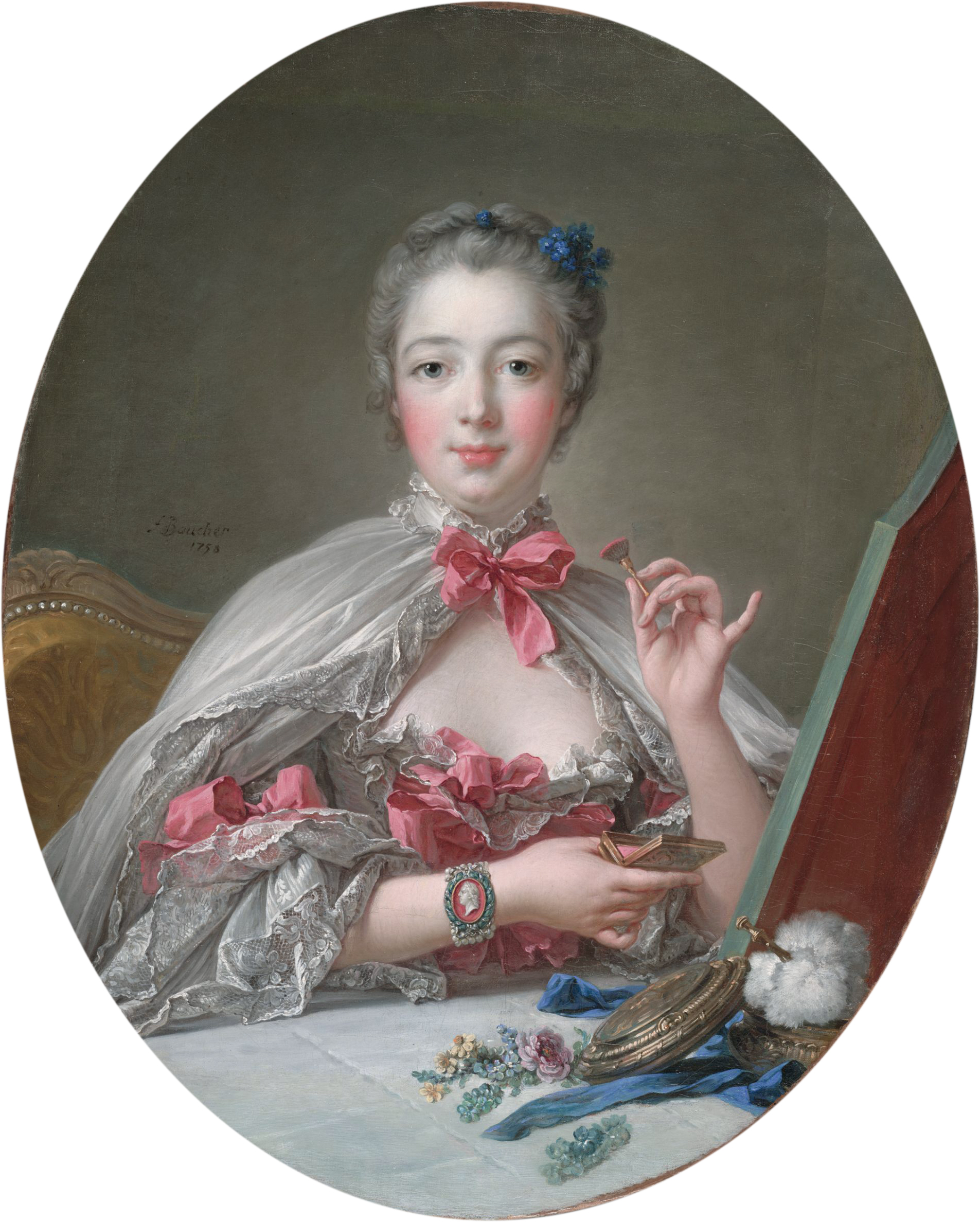
Jeanne Antoinette at a toilette table applying blush (portrait by François Boucher, 1758)

At the age of 20, Jeanne Antoinette was married to Charles Guillaume Le Normant d'Étiolles (1717–1799), the nephew of her guardian Charles Le Normant de Tournehem, who initiated the match and the large financial incentives that came with it. On 15 December 1740, Tournehem made his nephew his sole heir, disinheriting all his other nephews and nieces: the children of his brother and sister. These included the estate at Étiolles, a wedding gift from her guardian, which was situated on the edge of the royal hunting ground of the forest of Sénart. When she was married aged 20, she was already somewhat famous throughout the salons of Paris for her beauty, intelligence, and abundance of charm. Though initially displeased with their marriage arrangement, Le Normant d’Etioles was said to have swiftly fallen in love with Jeanne. Their marriage gave both parties something they desperately needed: Le Normant d'Etioles received "an enormous dowry" that lifted him from relative poverty. Jeanne-Antoinette "gained a level of respectability that overshadowed her mother's dubious past".

Once married, the couple seemed very much in love: Jeanne Antoinette would often joke that she would never leave Le Normant d’Etioles for anyone – except, of course, the king. The couple had a son who died in infancy and a daughter, Alexandrine Le Normant d'Étiolles born in 1744, who died at the age of nine.

== Attendance of salons ==
As a married woman, Jeanne Antoinette could frequent celebrated salons in Paris, such as those hosted by Mesdames de Tencin, Geoffrin, du Deffand and others. Within these salons she crossed paths with principal figures of the Enlightenment, including Voltaire, Charles Pinot Duclos, Montesquieu, Helvétius, and Bernard de Fontenelle. Additionally, Jeanne Antoinette created her own salon at Étiolles, which was attended by many of the cultural elite, among them were Crébillon fils, Montesquieu, the Cardinal de Bernis, and Voltaire. Within these circles she learned the fine art of conversation and developed the sharp wit for which she would later become known at Versailles.

== Meeting the King ==
Due to her involvement in Paris salons as well as her grace and beauty, Louis XV had heard the name of Jeanne Antoinette mentioned at court as early as 1742. In 1744, Jeanne Antoinette sought to catch the eye of the King while he led the hunt in the forest of Sénart. Because she occupied an estate near this location, she was permitted to follow the royal party at a distance. However, wanting to attract the King's notice, Jeanne Antoinette drove directly in front of the King's path, once in a pink phaeton, wearing a blue dress, and once in a blue phaeton, wearing a pink dress. The King sent a gift of venison to her. Though the King's current mistress Maria Anne de Mailly, named Madame de Châteauroux, had warned off Jeanne Antoinette, the position became vacant on 8 December 1744 when Châteauroux died. On 24 February 1745, Jeanne Antoinette received a formal invitation to attend the masked ball held on 25 February at the Palace of Versailles to celebrate the marriage of the Dauphin Louis of France to Infanta Maria Teresa of Spain. It was at this ball that the King, disguised along with seven courtiers as yew trees, publicly declared his affection for Jeanne Antoinette. Before all of court and the royal family, Louis unmasked himself before Jeanne Antoinette, who was dressed as Diana the Huntress in reference to their encounter in the forest of Sénart.

== Introduction to court ==
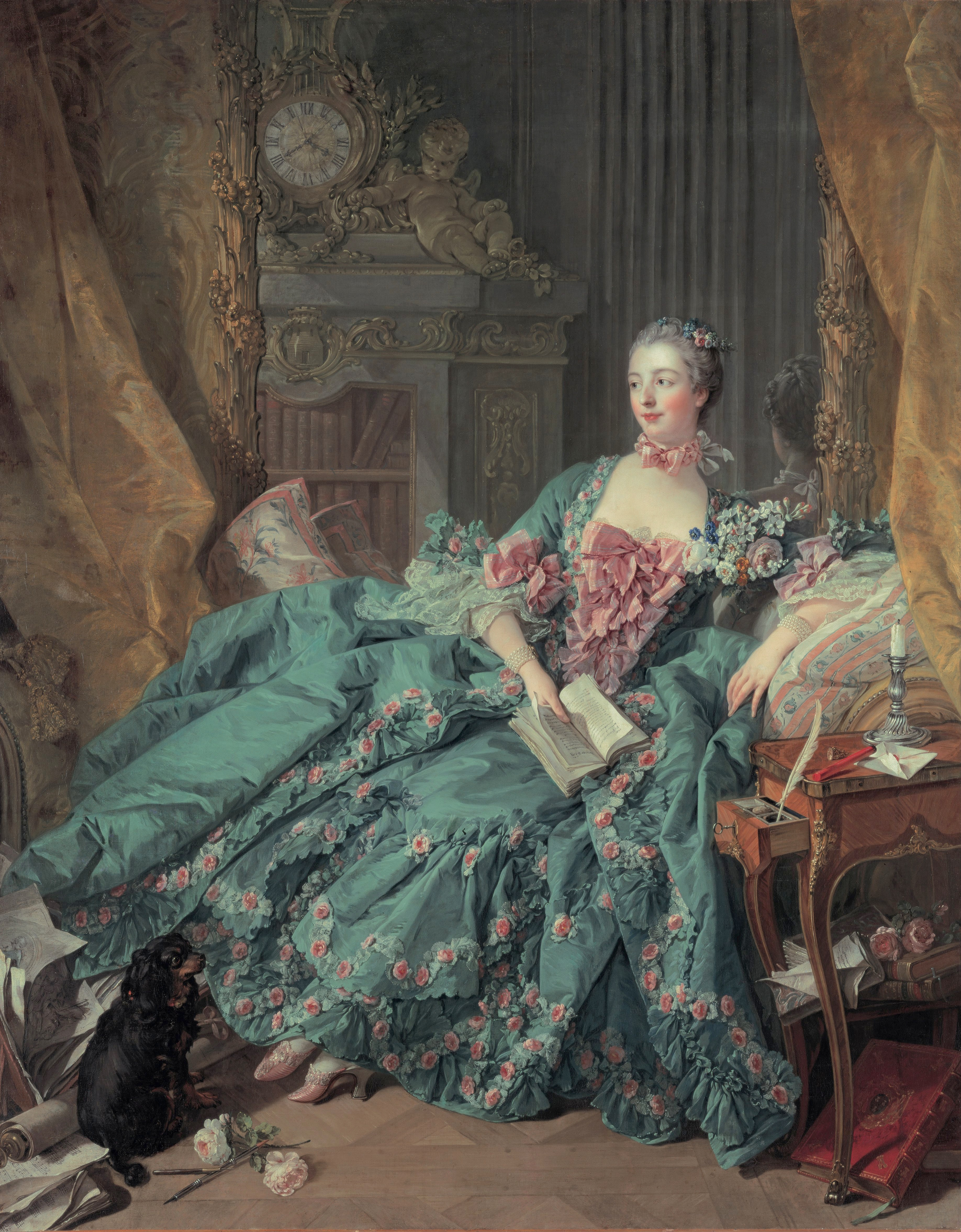
A portrait of Madame de Pompadour and a dog at the foot of her shoes (portrait by François Boucher, 1756)

By March, she was the King's mistress, installed at Versailles in an apartment directly above his. On 7 May, the official separation between her and her husband was pronounced. To be presented at court, she required a title. The King purchased the marquisate of Pompadour on 24 June and gave the estate, with title and coat-of-arms, to Jeanne Antoinette, making her a Marquise. On 14 September 1745, Madame de Pompadour made her formal entry before the King, presented by the King's cousin, the Princess of Conti. Determined to make her place at court secure, Jeanne Antoinette immediately attempted to forge a good relationship with the royal family. After the Queen engaged Pompadour in a conversation by enquiring after a mutual acquaintance, Madame de Saissac, Pompadour responded in delight, swearing her respect and loyalty to Marie Leszczyńska. The Queen in return favored Jeanne Antoinette instead of the King's other mistresses. Pompadour quickly mastered the highly mannered court etiquette. However, her mother died on Christmas Day of the same year, and did not live to see her daughter's achievement of becoming the undisputed royal mistress.

=== Royal mistress ===
Through her position as court favourite, Pompadour wielded considerable power and influence. She was elevated on 12 October 1752 to duchess and in 1756 to lady-in-waiting to the Queen, the most noble rank possible for a woman at court. Pompadour effectively played the role of prime minister, becoming responsible for appointing advancements, favors and dismissals, and contributing in domestic and foreign politics.

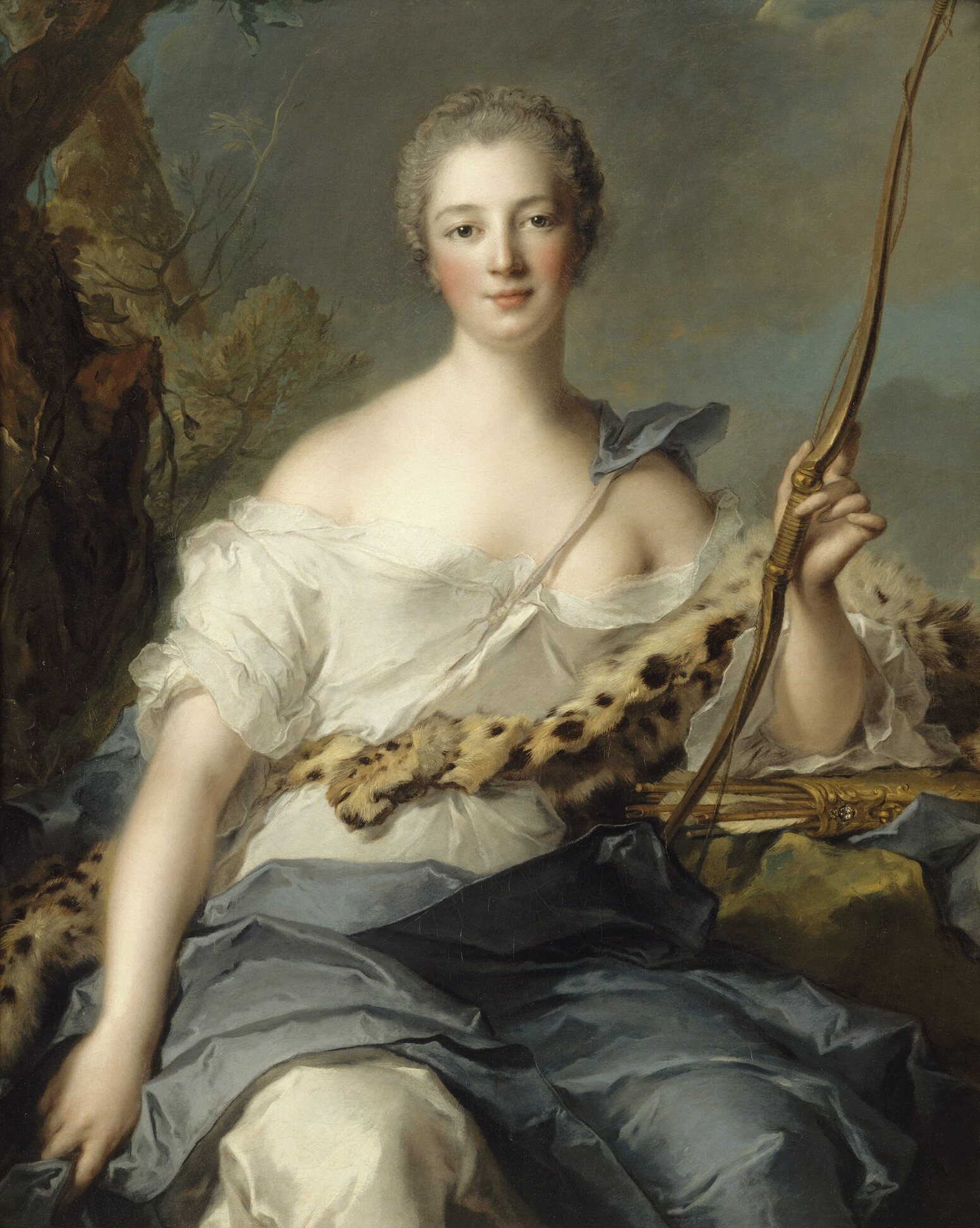
Madame de Pompadour as Diana the Huntress (portrait by Jean-Marc Nattier, 1746)

In 1755, she was approached by Wenzel Anton, Prince of Kaunitz-Rietberg, a prominent Austrian diplomat, asking her to intervene in the negotiations which led to the Treaty of Versailles. This was the beginning of the Diplomatic Revolution, which saw France allied to their former enemy Austria.

Under these changed alliances, the European powers entered the Seven Years' War, which saw France, Austria and Russia pitted against Britain and Prussia. France suffered a defeat at the hands of the Prussians in the Battle of Rossbach in 1757, and eventually lost the American colonies to the British. After Rossbach, Madame de Pompadour is alleged to have comforted the king with the now famous: "au reste, après nous, le Déluge" ("Besides, after us, the Deluge"). France emerged from the war diminished and virtually bankrupt.

Madame de Pompadour persisted in her support of these policies, and when Cardinal de Bernis failed her, she brought Choiseul into office and supported and guided him in all his plans: the Pacte de Famille, the suppression of the Jesuits, and the Treaty of Paris (1763). Britain's victories in the war had allowed it to surpass France as the leading colonial power – something which was commonly blamed on Pompadour.

Pompadour protected the Physiocrates school (its leader was Quesnay, her own doctor) which paved the way for Adam Smith's theories. She also defended the Encyclopédie, edited by Denis Diderot and Jean le Rond d'Alembert, against those, among them the Archbishop of Paris Christophe de Beaumont, who sought to have it suppressed. In Diderot's first novel, Les bijoux indiscrets (The Indiscreet Jewels), the characters of Mangogul and Mirzoza are allegories of Louis XV and Pompadour respectively. Diderot portrayed Pompadour in a flattering light, most likely to ensure her support for Encyclopedie. Pompadour had a copy of Les bijoux indiscrets in her library, which may explain why the crown did not pursue Diderot for such an indiscretion against the king.

The marquise had many enemies among the royal courtiers who felt it a disgrace that the king would thus compromise himself with a commoner. She was very sensitive to the unending libels called poissonnades, analogous to mazarinade against Cardinal Mazarin and a pun on her family name, Poisson, which means "fish" in French. Only with great reluctance did Louis take punitive action against her known enemies, such as Louis François Armand du Plessis, duc de Richelieu.

=== Friend of the King ===
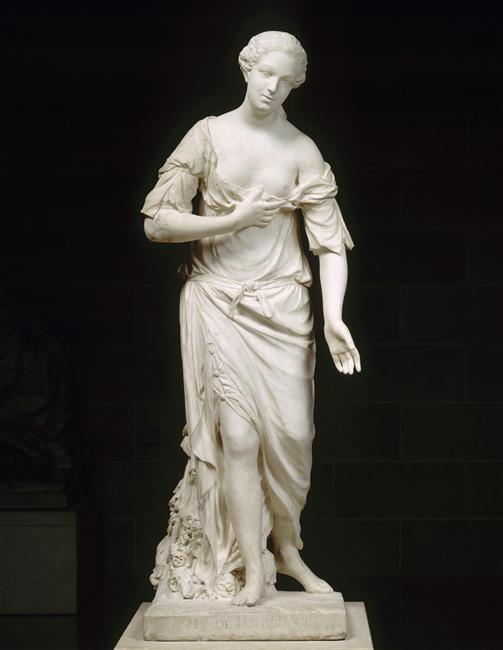
Jean Baptiste Pigalle: Madame de Pompadour as "Friendship" (Louvre)

Madame de Pompadour wielded influence in court due to her role as a confidante and friend to the King. Unlike previous mistresses of Louis XV, Pompadour became indispensable to the King by being the only person he trusted and who could be relied upon to tell him the truth. She provided Louis with the comfort he craved, as he was prone to melancholy and boredom. Pompadour captivated and amused him through private parties, operas, hunting afternoons, and journeys among their various chateaux and lodgings. Occasionally, she even invited his wife, Queen Marie Leszczyńska, with his assistance.

Around 1750 Madame de Pompadour's role as friend of the King became her solitary role, as she ceased her sexual relationship with the King. The end of this sexual relationship was in part attributed to Pompadour's poor health, as she suffered from the aftereffects of whooping cough, recurring colds and bronchitis, spitting blood, headaches, three of the King's children miscarried, as well as an unconfirmed case of leucorrhoea. In addition, Pompadour admitted to having "the misfortune to be of a very cold temperament", and attempts to increase her libido with a diet of truffles, celery, and vanilla were unsuccessful. Furthermore, in 1750 the Jubilee year placed pressure upon the King to repent of his sins and renounce his mistress. In order to cement her continuing importance as favourite in the face of these impediments, Pompadour took on the role of "friend of the King" which she announced through artistic patronage. Pompadour's announcement was most prominently declared through her commission from Jean Baptiste Pigalle, of a sculpture representing herself as Amitié [friendship], offering herself to a now lost pendant sculpture of Louis XV. Pompadour also had a related sculpture depicted in a portrait of herself painted by François Boucher in 1759.

=== The consecration and the château de Saint-Ouen ===
Built in the second half of the 17th century, the château de Saint-Ouen, (near Paris, in the Seine-Saint-Denis department), had belonged to the prestigious dukes of Gesvres until its destruction in 1821, to build the actual château for the comtesse du Cayla. After the sale of her château de Crécy, unexpectedly, the marquise de Pompadour did not purchase Saint-Ouen but benefited from the usufruct of this residence from 1759 until her death in 1764.

The plan of the château, originally designed by Antoine Lepautre, was a classical U-shape and consisted of a long façade with two wings prolonging the main body, facing the river Seine on the garden side.

Saint-Ouen's originality resided in its interior distribution: the main body consisted of a succession of three "salons à l'italienne", whose decoration was entirely modified by the Slodtz family in the 1750s for the Gesvres family. In French architecture, a "salon à l'italienne" is a room filling the entire height of a building: a memorable example is the Grand salon at Vaux-le-Vicomte.

In addition to this layout, as soon as Madame de Pompadour acquired the estate, a vast project of reorganisation of all the buildings (including stables and dependences) was planned, costing more than 500,000 livres. In the absence of the original plans, a restitution of the ground floor has been proposed. It seems that the architect who supervised this reorganisation was Ange-Jacques Gabriel, who, at that time, directed all the renovation and building works of the different residences of Mme de Pompadour. Using the central "salon à l'italienne" as a pivot, an apartment was created for the King as a counterpart to that of the henceforth Duchesse de Pompadour, making the prestigious château de Saint-Ouen into a reflection of her own status – a symbol of her social and political achievements.

=== Historical misconceptions ===
Despite misconceptions perpetuated by her contemporaries and much of historical discourse, Pompadour did not supplement her role as mistress by employing replacement lovers for the king. Following the cessation of Pompadour's sexual relationship with Louis, the King met with young women in a house in Versailles established particularly for that purpose, called the Parc-aux-Cerfs, or Stag Park. It was not, as often described, a harem; it was occupied by only one woman at a time. Pompadour was not involved, other than to accept it as a "necessity". Pompadour's only contribution to the Stag Park was to accept it as a favorable alternative to a rival at court, as she stated: "It is his heart I want! All these little girls with no education will not take it from me. I would not be so calm if I saw some pretty woman of the court or the capital trying to conquer it."

=== Patron and participant in the arts ===
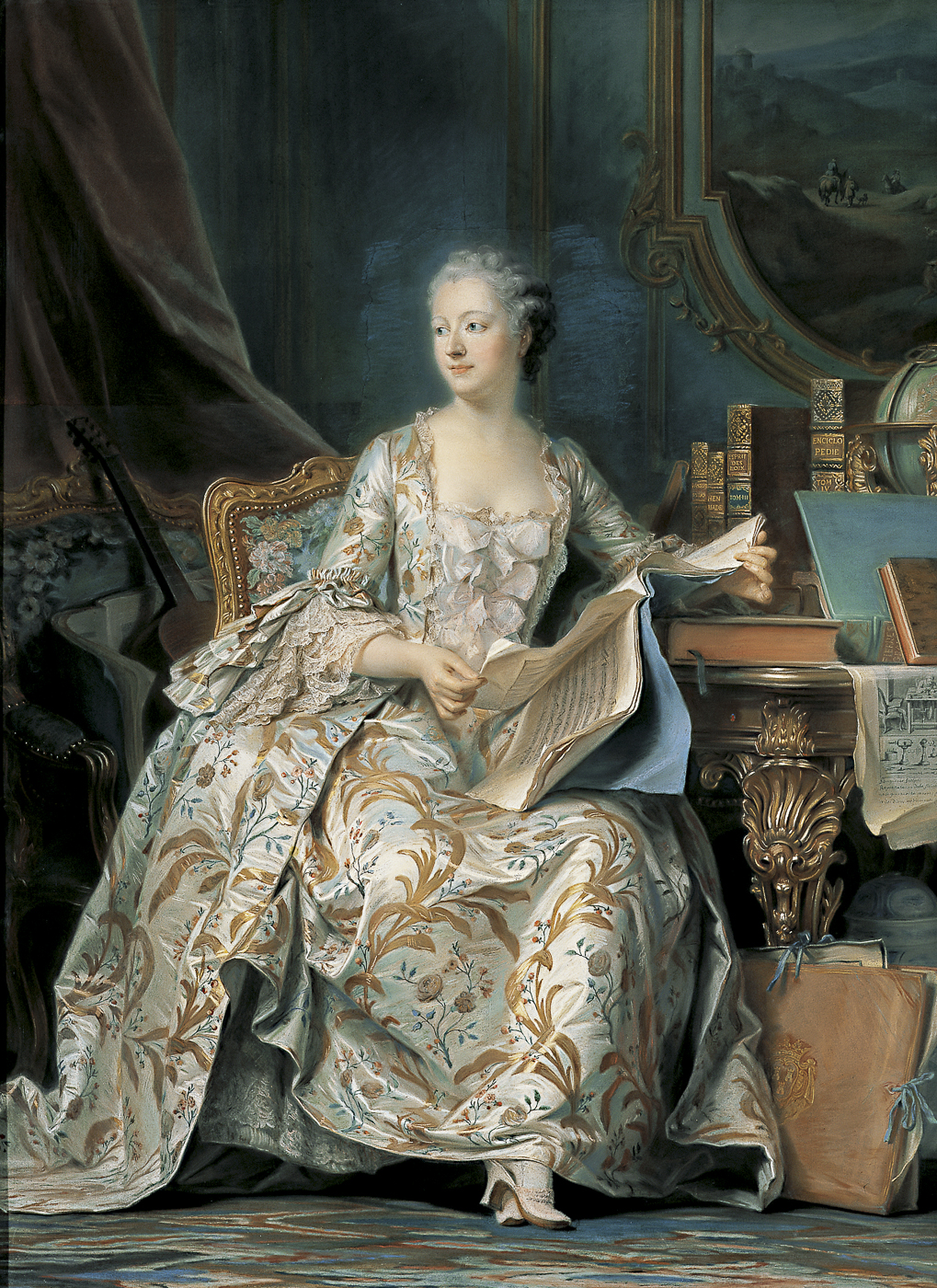
Madame de Pompadour, pastel by Maurice Quentin de La Tour, shown at the Paris Salon, 1755 (Louvre)

Madame de Pompadour was an influential patron of the arts who played a central role in making Paris the perceived capital of taste and culture in Europe. She attained this influence through the appointment of her guardian Charles François Paul Le Normant de Tournehem, and later her brother, Abel-François Poisson to the post of Directeur Général des Bâtiments, which controlled government policy and expenditures for the arts. She championed French pride by constructing and later outright buying a porcelain factory at Sèvres in 1759, which became one of the most famous porcelain manufacturers in Europe, and which provided skilled jobs for the region. Numerous sculptors and portrait painters were patronized by Pompadour, among them the court artist Jean-Marc Nattier, in the 1750s François Boucher, Jean-Baptiste Réveillon and François-Hubert Drouais. She patronized Jacques Guay, the gemstone engraver, who taught her to engrave in onyx, jasper and other semi-precious stones.

Pompadour greatly influenced and stimulated innovation in what is known as the Rococo style in the fine and decorative arts: for example, through her patronage of the artists like Boucher and the constant refurnishing of the fifteen residences she held with Louis. Like Pompadour, this style was critiqued by some as a pernicious "feminine" influence, despite the fact that it was embraced by many men as well as women. However it is also widely recognised that Madame de Pompadour engaged with prominent artists as a way to capture the attention of the king whilst cultivating her public image. The oil sketch of Pompadour's lost portrait by Boucher sits in the Starhemberg room at Waddesdon Manor built by Baron Ferdinand de Rothschild, surrounded by Sèvres porcelain, another industry that she greatly influenced and innovated through personal dissemination across an international network of her own clientele.

In addition to supporting the arts as a patron, Pompadour also participated in them more directly. Besides being one of the few 18th-century practitioners of gem engraving, she was an acclaimed stage actress in plays staged at her private theaters at Versailles and Bellevue. Some of the artworks made under Pompadour's purview by other hands, notably the 1758 portrait by Boucher of Mme de Pompadour at Her Toilette, can be viewed as collaborations with Pompadour.

Madame de Pompadour is considered an amateur printmaker who made print engravings with the help of Boucher. She had engraving equipment, to create the prints of works by Boucher and Guay, brought within her personal apartments in Versailles

Her political mind also can be attributed to her great book collection. She collected influential books such as the History of the Stuarts, printed in 1760 with her own printing press which can be determined through the stamp markings of her arms located on the cover. Baron Ferdinand de Rothschild, an avid 19th-century collector in London and Waddesdon Manor, collected a number of her books, including this previously mentioned book and a copy of her published catalogue of books from 1764, which lists her entire collection.

== Artwork ==
Madame de Pompadour created 52 engraved prints, of drawings by Boucher, after gemstone engravings by Guay. Her collection of work, in book form, is titled Suite d'Estampes Gravées Par Madame la Marquise de Pompadour d'Apres les Pierres Gravées de Guay, Graveur du Roy, which in English is Series of Prints engraved by Madame la Marquise de Pompadour after the engraved stones of Guay, engraver of the King.

The personal portfolio of Madame de Pompadour was found in the Walters Art Museum manuscript room by art historian Susan Wager.

Some art historians argue whether or not she should be considered a collaborator with the artists under her patronage, since there is no documentation of how much Pompadour might have contributed to the works; whose idea, and whose composition, will remain a mystery.

List of museums and libraries with a copy of her portfolio

- Walters Art Museum, Baltimore
- Met Museum, New York
- British Museum, London
- Boston Museum of Fine Arts
- Bibliothèque de l'Arsenal, Paris
- Rothschild collection, Louvre
- Bibliothèque de Troyes

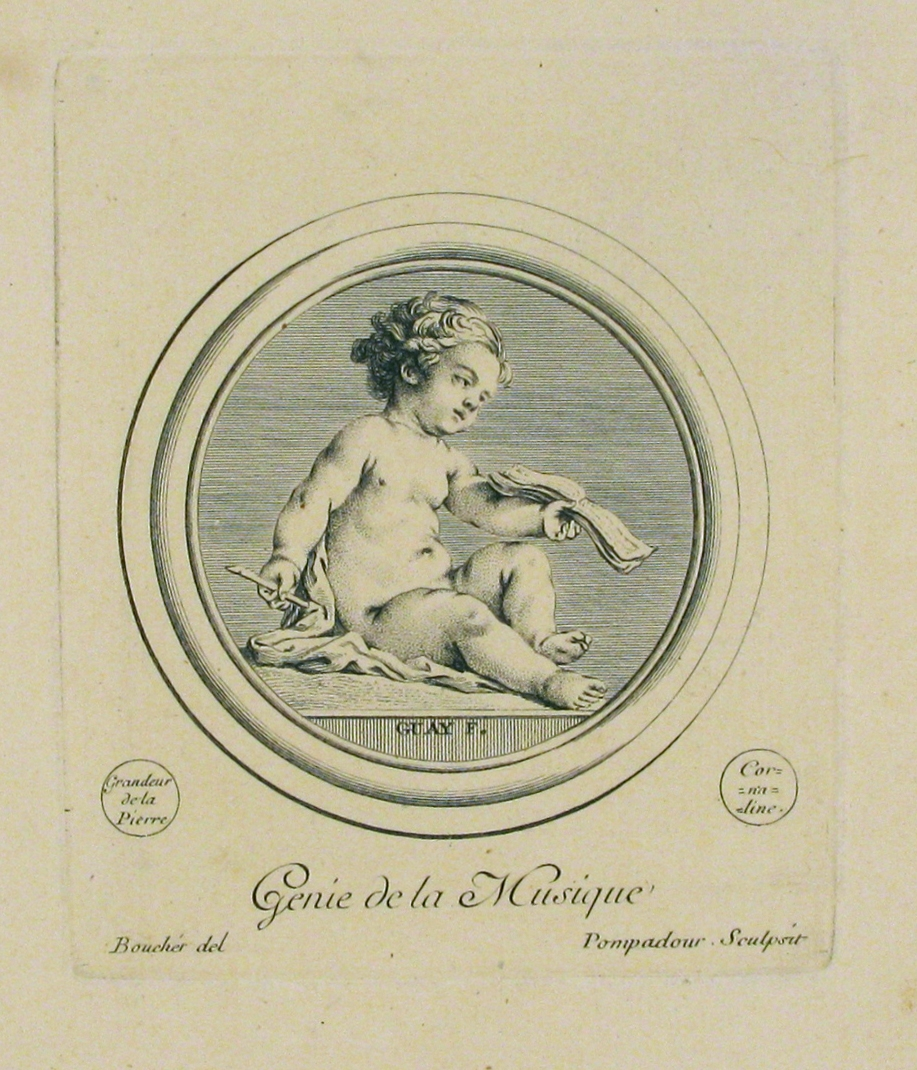
Genius of Music; engraved print by Madame de Pompadour of a drawing by Boucher, after an engraved gemstone by Guay c. 1755.

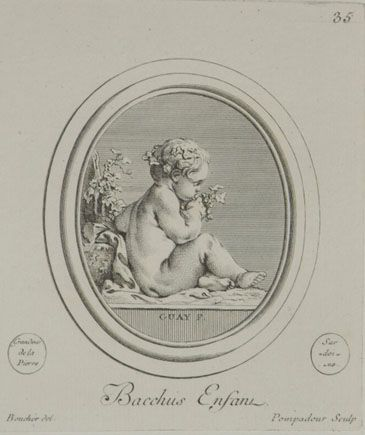
Infant Bacchus; engraving by Madame de Pompadour of a drawing by Boucher after an engraved gemstone by Guay c. 1755.

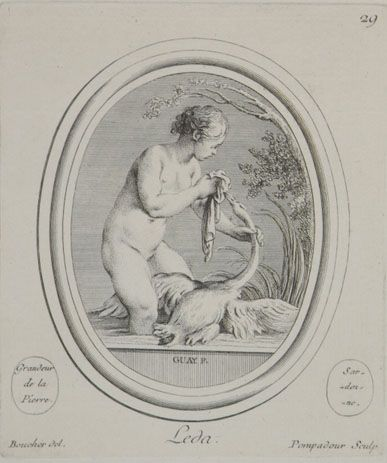
Leda; engraved print by Madame de Pompadour of a drawing by Boucher, after an engraved gemstone by Guay c. 1755.

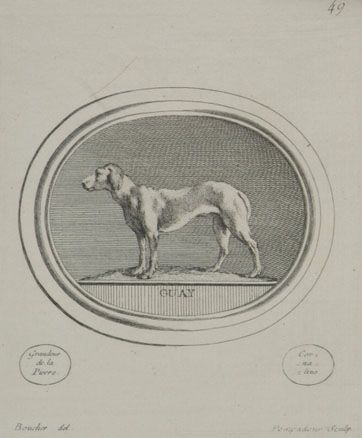
Dog; engraved print by Madame de Pompadour of a drawing by Boucher, after an engraved gemstone by Guay c. 1755.

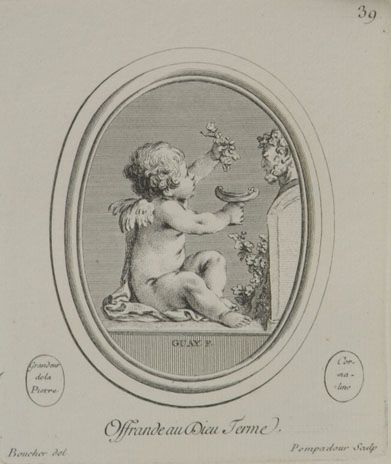
Offering to the God Terme (or Terminus); engraved print by Madame de Pompadour of a drawing by Boucher, after an engraved gemstone by Guay c. 1755.

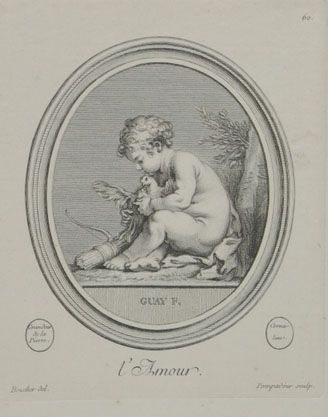
Love; Engraved print by Madame de Pompadour of a drawing by Boucher, after an engraved gemstone by Guay c. 1755.

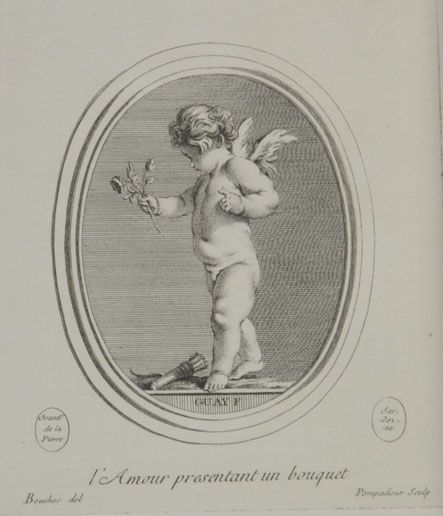
Love Presenting a Bouquet; engraved print by Madame de Pompadour of a drawing by Boucher, after an engraved gemstone by Guay c. 1755.

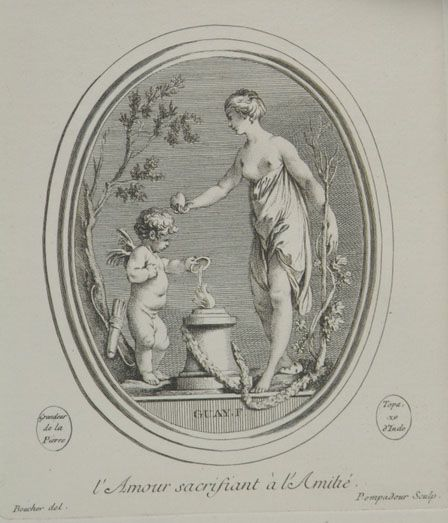
Love Sacrificing to Friendship; engraved print by Madame de Pompadour of a drawing by Boucher, after an engraved gemstone by Guay c. 1755.

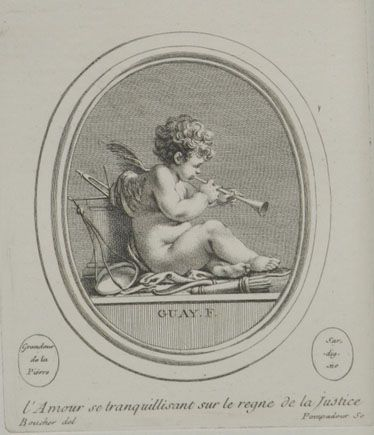
Love at Peace in the Reign of Justice; engraved print by Madame de Pompadour of a drawing by Boucher, after an engraved gemstone by Guay c. 1755

== Death ==
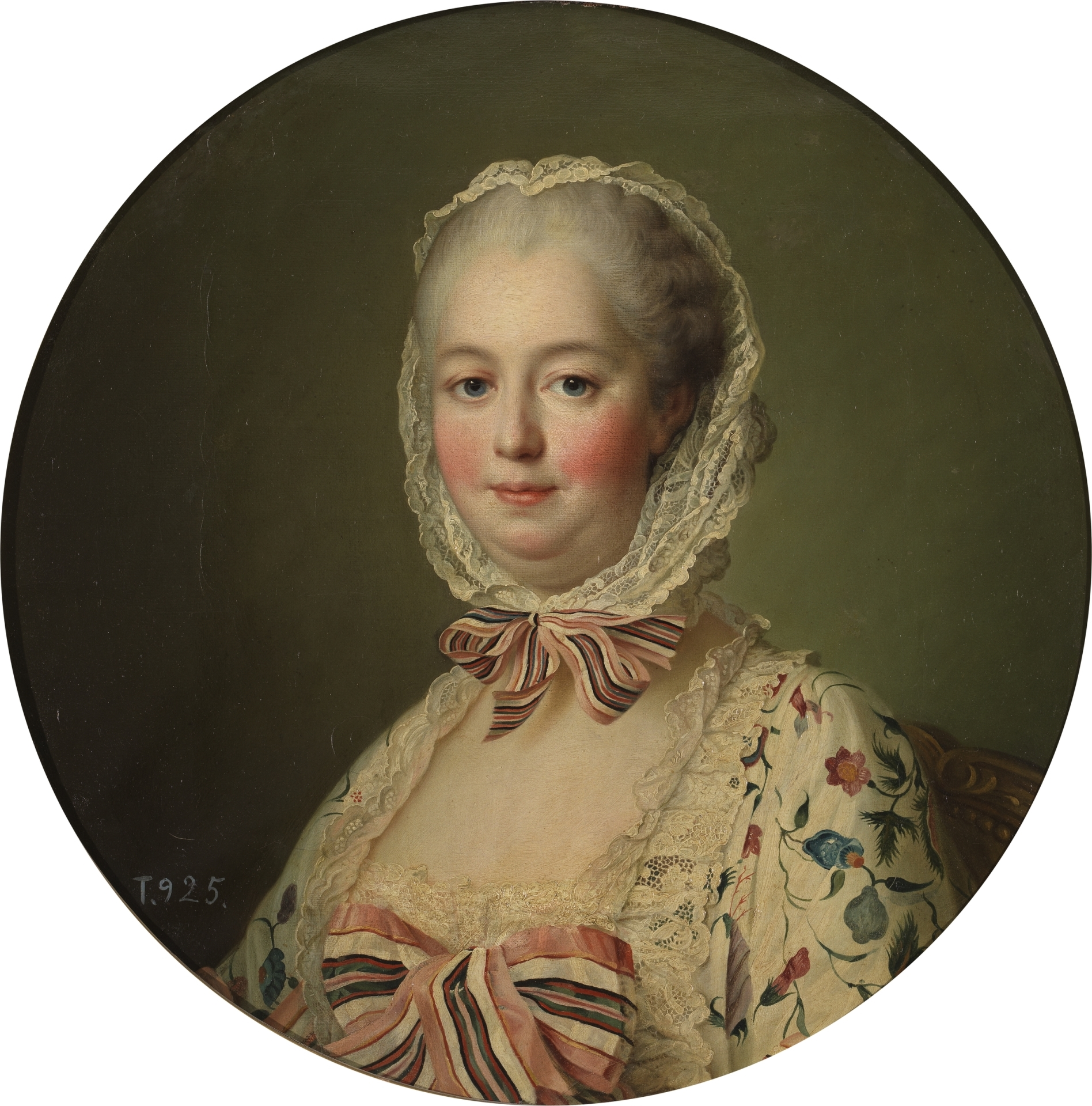
Her memorial posthumous portrait finished in 1764, but begun while she was alive, by François-Hubert Drouais

Louis XV remained devoted to Pompadour until her death from tuberculosis in 1764 at the age of 42. Louis nursed her through her illness. Even her enemies admired her courage during the final painful weeks. Voltaire wrote: "I am very sad at the death of Madame de Pompadour. I was indebted to her and I mourn her out of gratitude. It seems absurd that while an ancient pen-pusher, hardly able to walk, should still be alive, a beautiful woman, in the midst of a splendid career, should die at the age of forty-two." Many of her enemies were, however, greatly relieved. Looking at the rain during the departure of his mistress's coffin from Versailles, the devastated king reportedly said: "La marquise n'aura pas de beau temps pour son voyage" ("The marquise will not have good weather for her journey"). She was buried at the Couvent des Capucines in Paris.

== Portrayals in film and television ==
Madame de Pompadour has been depicted on screen in film and television on many occasions, beginning in 1924 with Paulette Duval opposite Rudolph Valentino in Monsieur Beaucaire. A biopic came out three years later called Madame Pompadour directed by Herbert Wilcox, in which she was played by Dorothy Gish. Other actresses to have played her include:

- Anny Ahlers (Madame Pompadour, 1931)
- Doris Kenyon (Voltaire, 1933)
- Jeanne Boitel (Remontons les Champs-Élysées, 1938)
- Hillary Brooke (Monsieur Beaucaire, 1946)
- Geneviève Page (Fanfan la Tulipe, 1952)
- Micheline Presle (Royal Affairs in Versailles, 1954)
- Monique Lepage (Le Courrier du roy, 1958)
- Elfie Mayerhofer (Madame Pompadour, 1960)
- Noëmi Nadelmann (Madame Pompadour, 1996)
- Katja Flint (Il giovane Casanova, 2002)
- Hélène de Fougerolles (Fanfan la Tulipe, 2003)
- Sophia Myles (as an adult) and Jessica Atkins (as a child) in "The Girl in the Fireplace", an episode of the BBC science fiction series Doctor Who, 2006.
- Hélène de Fougerolles (Jeanne Poisson, marquise de Pompadour, TV 2006)
- Bojana Novakovic (Casanova, 2015)

== In popular culture ==
- The 56th (West Essex) Regiment of Foot, a unit of the British Army that existed from 1755 to 1881, was nicknamed "The Pompadours", as the purple facing of the regiment's uniform was allegedly Pompadour's favourite colour. Some soldiers of the regiment preferred to claim that it was the colour of her underwear. Its successor, the Essex Regiment, kept the colour and the nickname.
- The "coupe de champagne" (French champagne glass) is sometimes claimed to have been modelled on the shape of her breast, although this is probably not the case.
- Madame Pompadour, a German operetta with music by Leo Fall and book and lyrics by Rudolph Schanzer and Ernst Welisch that also had successful adaptations in London (1923), and Broadway, where it opened the Martin Beck Theatre in 1924.
- She was the subject of several portraits throughout her lifetime.
- According to legend, the "marquise cut" diamond, also called "navette", was commissioned by Louis XV to resemble the mouth of Madame de Pompadour.
- The Pompadour hairstyle was named after Madame de Pompadour.
- In the second act of Tchaikovsky's opera The Queen of Spades, the role of the countess recalls the great names of the artists of her past: "and sometimes even the Marquise de Pompadour in person!"
- She is mentioned in the first line of the Johnny Mercer song "Personality", featuring the Pied Pipers.
- Madame De Pompadour is one of the main characters in "The Girl in the Fireplace", the fourth episode of the second series of the second run of the Doctor Who revival.
