= The Toilet of Venus (Boucher) =

1751 painting by François Boucher

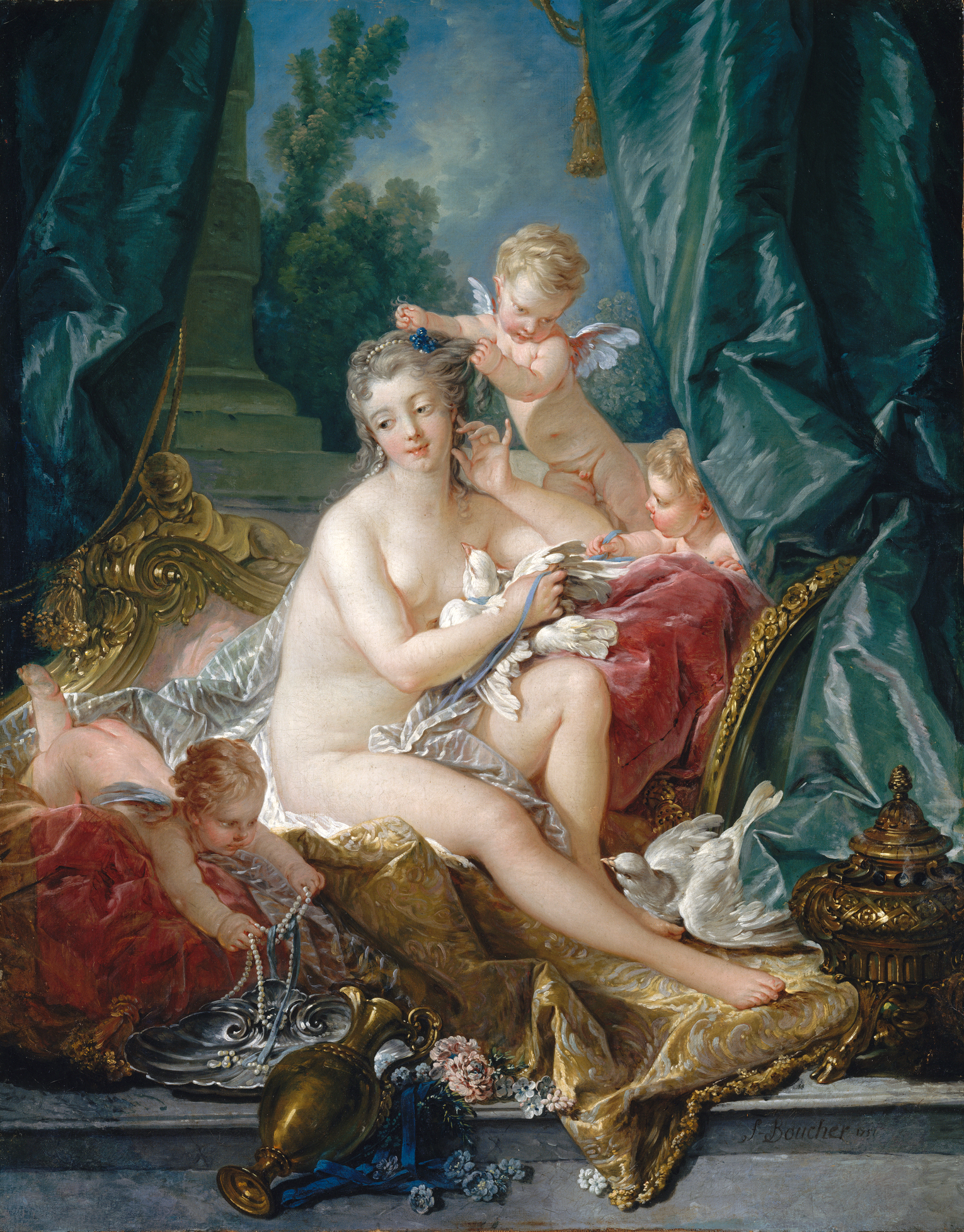
- Artist: François Boucher
- Year: 1751
- Medium: Oil on canvas
- Dimensions: 42 5/8 x 33 1/2 in. (108.3 x 85.1 cm)
- Location: The Metropolitan Museum of Art, New York

The Toilet of Venus is an oil painting on canvas completed in 1751 by the French Rococo painter François Boucher. It was commissioned by Madame de Pompadour, for her shared retreat with her lover, King Louis XV. The painting portrays a nude Venus, seated on an ornate love seat alongside three putti, surrounded by rich fabrics and precious objects. A cassolette in the lower right corner acts as a small nod to the Classical style and inadvertently foreshadows the Neoclassical athénienne. Additionally, Boucher's involvement in theatrical design and Madame de Pompadour's role of Venus in an opera-ballet production likely influenced the painting's style and subject. It was originally conceived as a pendant to Boucher's Bath of Venus, but the two paintings are now housed in different museums. The Toilet of Venus is currently held in the collection of the Metropolitan Museum of Art in New York.

== Context ==
Madame de Pompadour, a daughter of a financier and the official mistress of Louis XV, was a consistent patron of Boucher. She commissioned Boucher to create paintings for her estates, including the Château de Bellevue, the country retreat for which The Toilet of Venus was commissioned. It was requested for the salle de bain (bathroom) of the Château, along with its pendant, The Bath of Venus. Boucher commonly painted mythological subjects, a theme that is continued in The Toilet of Venus, which represents the Roman goddess Venus, with subtle allusions to Madame de Pompadour.

== Description ==
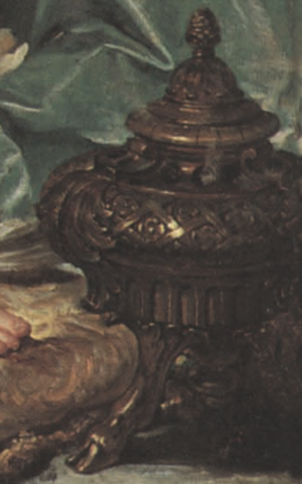
Enlarged image of the painting's cassolette and its pieds de bieche

This painting depicts a nude Venus, the Roman goddess of love and beauty, on a rococo canapé that is draped in pink velvet fabric, in a lavish interior. To her sides, drawn blue curtains reveal the greenery and outdoor landscape in the background. Three small putti accompany the goddess and help her tend to her appearance: one arranging her hair, another handing her a ribbon, and a third raising a tangled pearl necklace. The goddess holds one of two doves in her hand, tying a ribbon around its neck, while the other sits at her feet. At the bottom of the painting, a pitcher is tilted over and a cassolette (perfume burner) stands to her right. Additionally, several objects scattered around the setting—such as the pitcher, silver shell-shaped tray, pearl necklace, and loose flowers—serve as attributes to Venus. The painting embodies key characteristics of the Rococo style, such as a pastel color palette, dynamic composition, and the richly sensual textures of fabric and gilded surfaces.

=== Classical influences ===
Even though this painting exhibits characteristics of the Rococo style, it also features hints of Classical influences, particularly in the cassolette in the bottom right of the composition. For example, on the tripod legs of the cassolette, there are small deer-hoof feet at its base. This ornamental detail is also known as pieds de biche (doe's feet) which recalls Ancient Roman and Greek tripods. Additionally, the mosaic-inspired decoration on the body of the vessel, along with the acanthus-leaf moldings and pinecone finial atop the cassolette are classically inspired motifs and patterns. The intent behind the cassolette was not to create a historically accurate Greek artifact but rather to interpret it "à la grecque." The features of the cassolette foreshadow the athénienne, a Neoclassical tripod-based piece of furniture, invented by Jean-Henri Eberts in 1773.

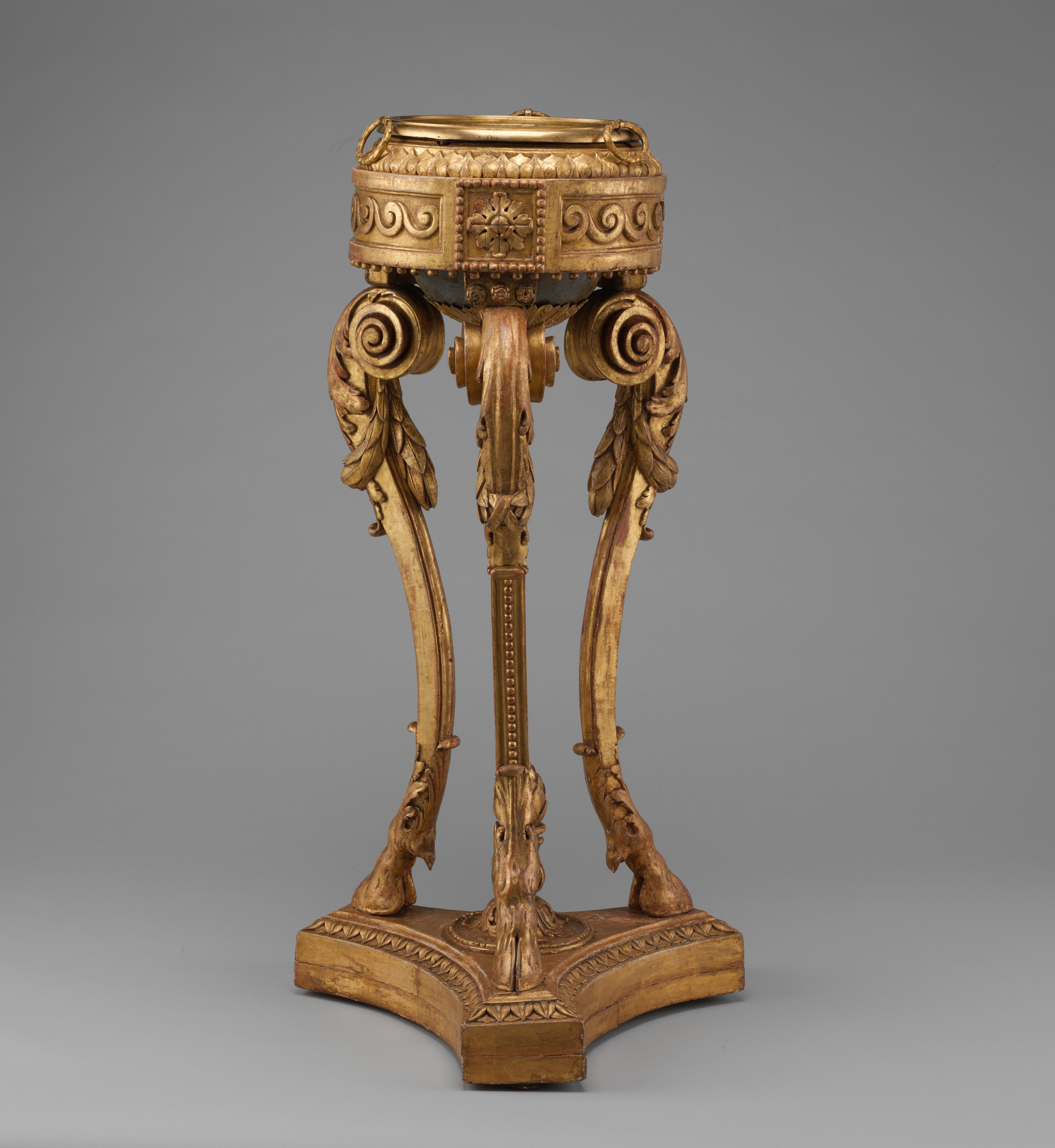
Example of an athénienne with pieds de bieche

=== Influences of the opera and Madame de Pompadour ===
Boucher's involvement in stage production and costume design alongside his friend Charles Simon Favart may have influenced his Rococo style, reflecting common themes of pleasure and love. Further, Madame de Pompadour had been cast as the lead role of Venus in a piece titled "La Toilette de Vénus" in Pierre Laujon's ballet héroïque La Journée Galante in February of 1750, one year prior to the completion of The Toilet of Venus in 1751. This role may have served as an inspiration for the painting. The art historian Alastair Laing has hypothesized that the painting incorporated elements of stage sets from the period, such as the cassolette, which was found in prop lists of the time. The painting's location in a salle de bain—a room with "erotic associations"—and its connection with Pompadour's stage role have led art historians to see the painting as a purposeful allusion to Madame de Pompadour and her position as the king's mistress.

== Provenance ==
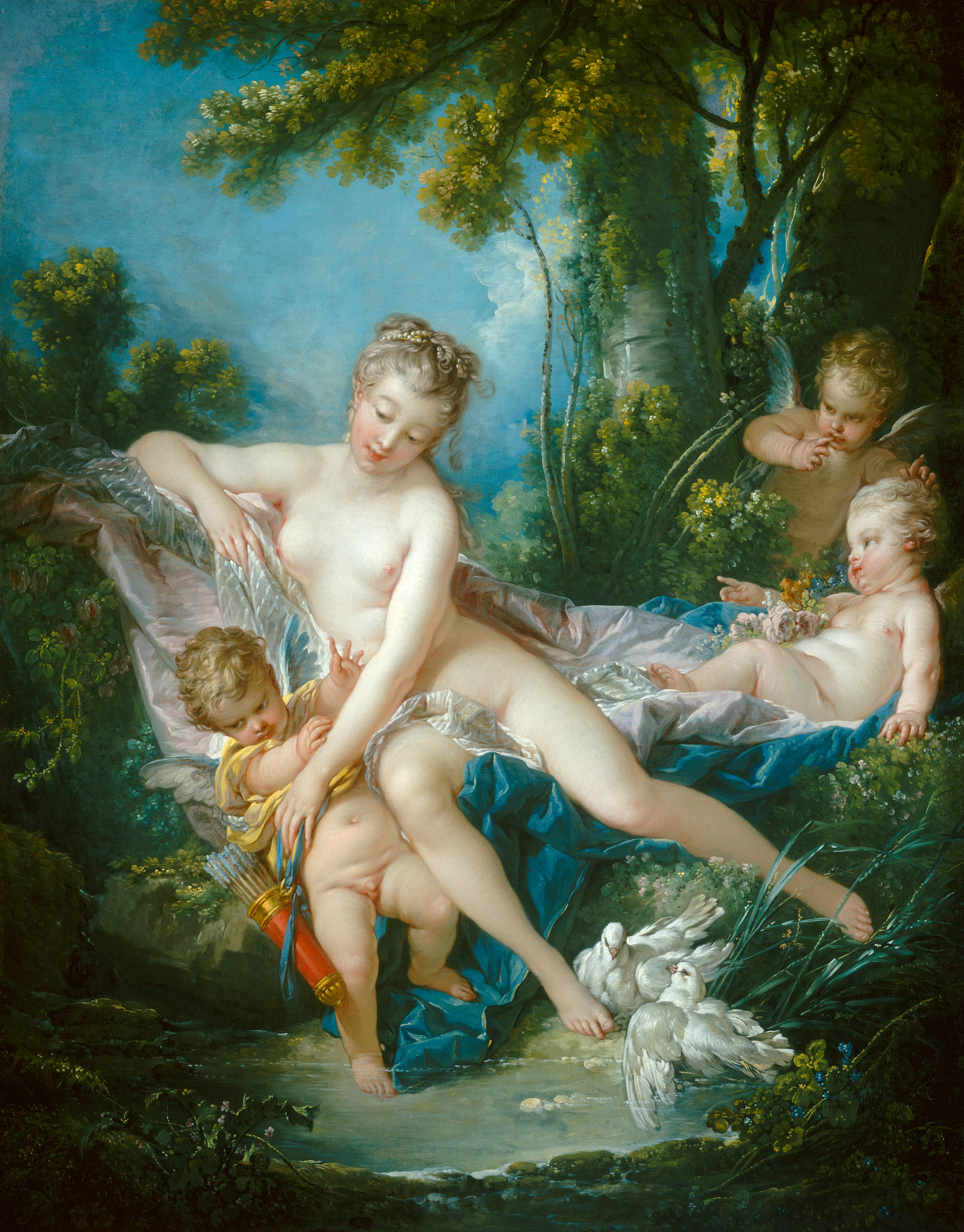
François Boucher, The Bath of Venus, 1751, pendant to The Toilet of Venus

The painting was owned by Madame de Pompadour until her death in 1764, when it was found among her possessions together with The Bath of Venus in the Hôtel de Pompadour (currently the Élysée Palace). The paintings were then taken into the collection of her brother, Abel-François Poisson. In 1781, Poisson died and the paintings were sold, at which time they pendant works were separated.

The painting was bought by Nicolas de Boullongne in 1782, a member of a financier family in Paris. For over a century, the painting was kept in various private collections. In 1895, the painting was sold by London art collector C. J. Wertheimer to William Kissam Vanderbilt's first wife, Alva Belmont Smith. The Vanderbilt family bequeathed the painting to the Metropolitan Museum of Art upon William's death in 1920.

== Print ==
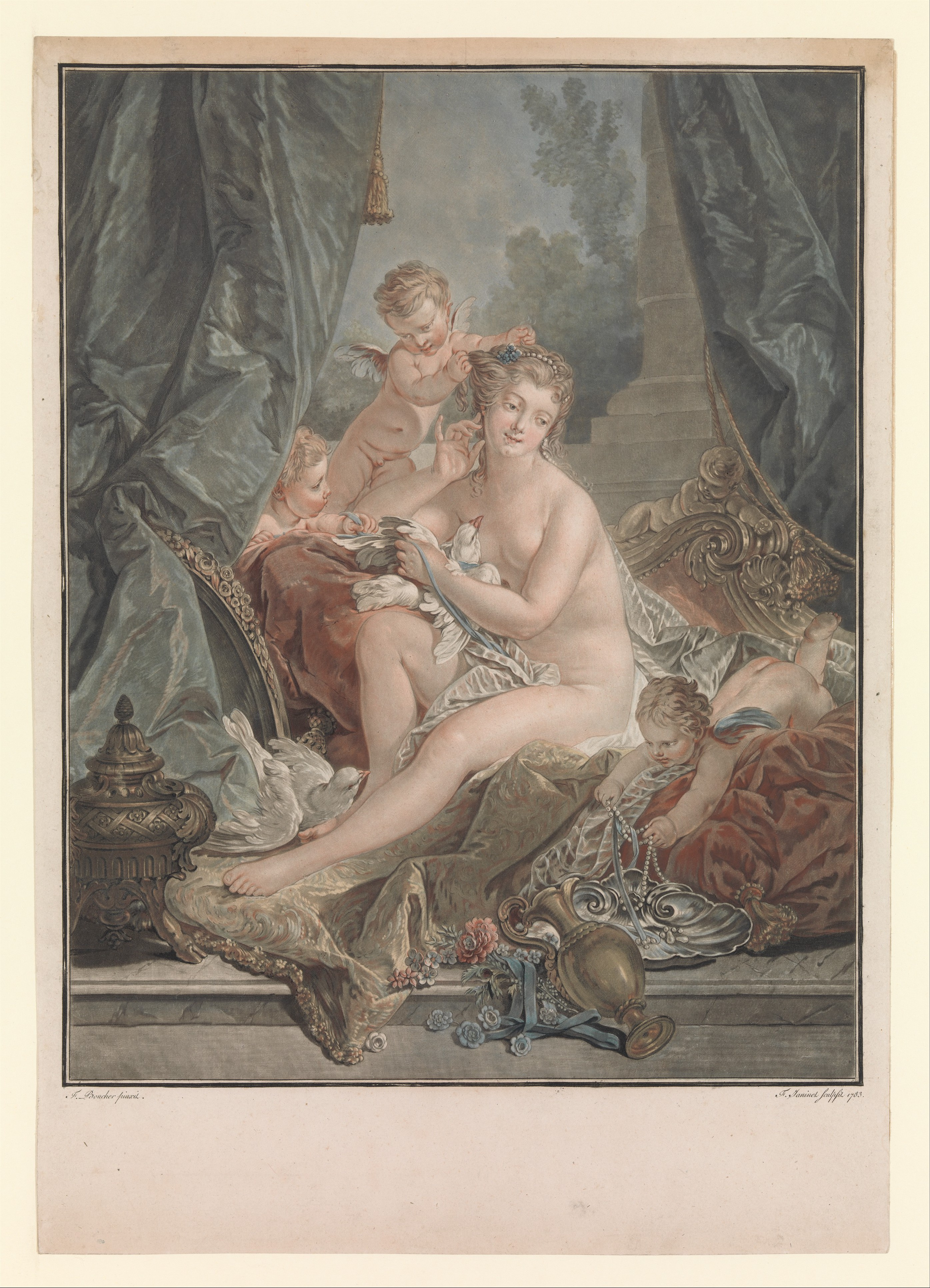
Jean François Janinet after François Boucher, The Toilet of Venus, 1783.

While The Toilet of Venus was on the market in 1782, it was engraved by Jean-François Janinet and published by Jacques Chereau. The engraving was dedicated to Madame de Coislin, who had been in competition against Madame de Pompadour for the position of King Louis XV's mistress. This dedication may have been intended ironically, given Madame de Pompadour's personal identification with the painting and the role of Venus.
