= Aquatint =

Tonal printmaking technique

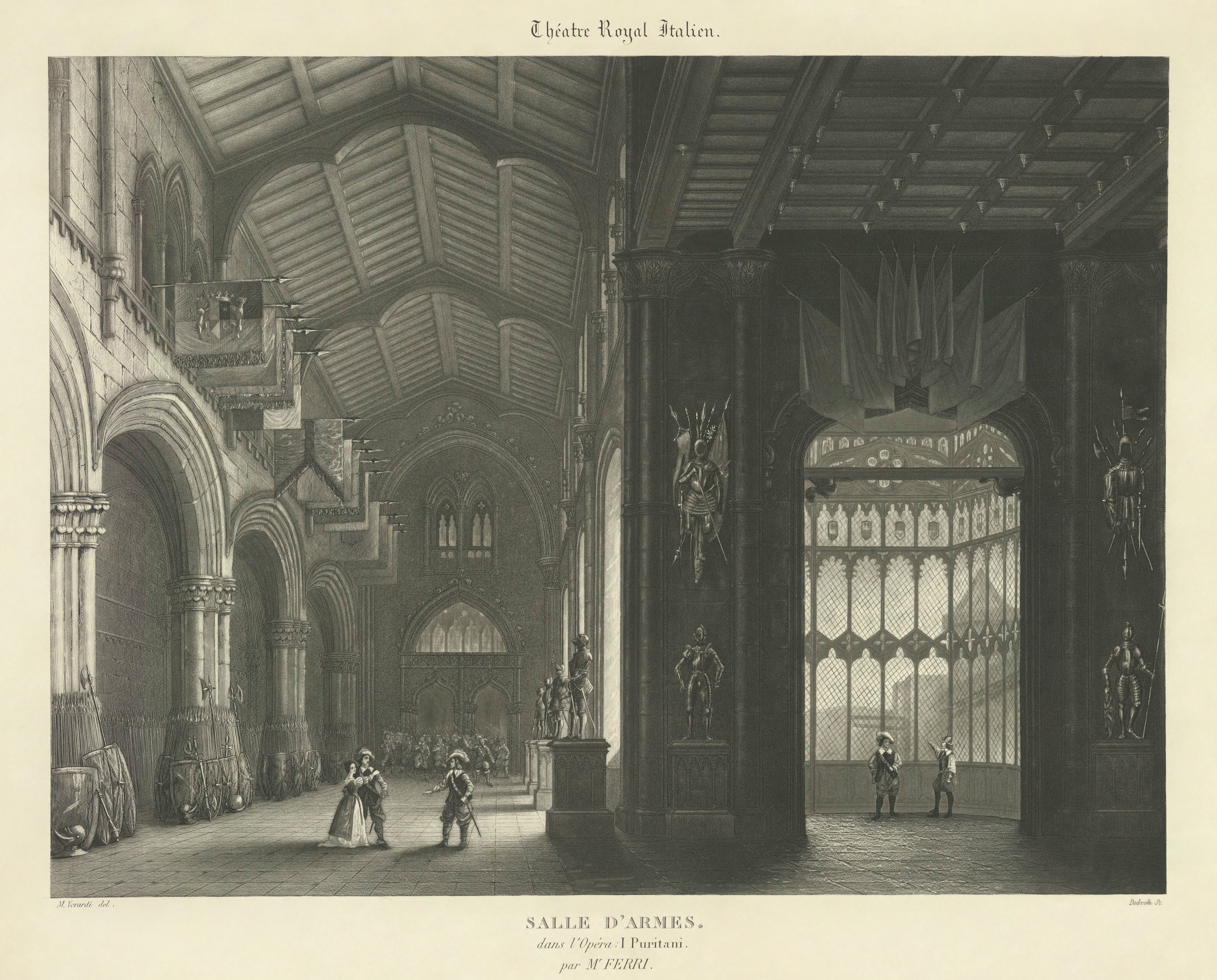
1835 aquatint showing the first production of I puritani. Note range of tones.

Aquatint is an intaglio printmaking technique, a variant of etching that produces areas of tone rather than lines. For this reason it has mostly been used in conjunction with etching, to give both lines and shaded tone. It has also been used historically to print in colour, both by printing with multiple plates in different colours, and by making monochrome prints that were then hand-coloured with watercolour. The term colour etching, frequently used in the art trade, is potentially ambiguous, but most often means one of these two options.

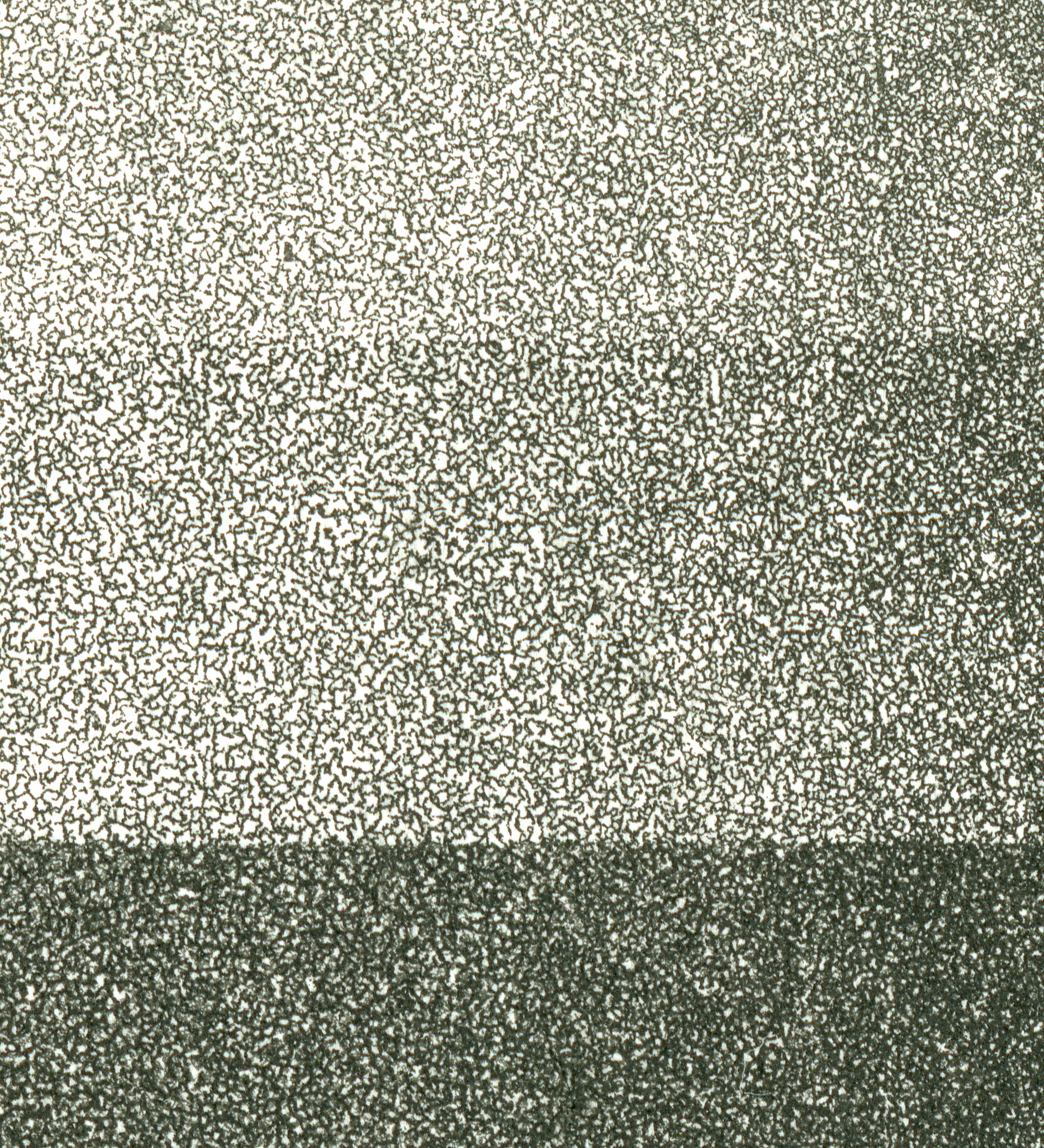
Demonstration sections of printed aquatint, magnified.

It has been in regular use since the later 18th century, and was most widely used between about 1770 and 1830, when it was used both for artistic prints and decorative ones. After about 1830 it lost ground to lithography and other techniques. There have been periodic revivals among artists since then. An aquatint plate wears out relatively quickly, and is less easily reworked than other intaglio plates. Many of Goya's plates were reprinted too often posthumously, giving very poor impressions.

Among the most famous prints using the aquatint technique are the major series by Goya, many of The Birds of America by John James Audubon (with the colour added by hand), and prints by Mary Cassatt printed in colour using several plates.

== Technique ==
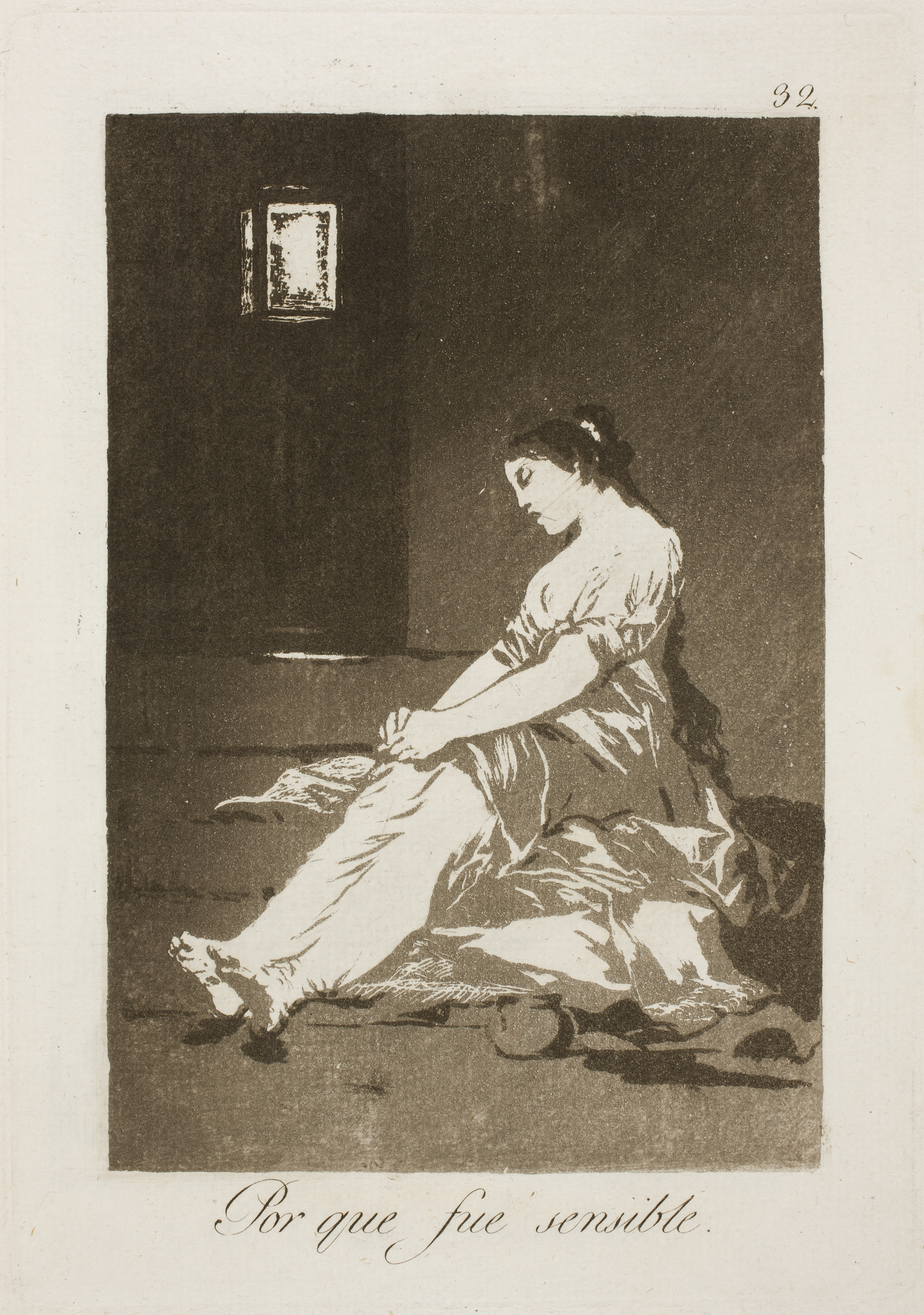
Goya, No. 32 of Los Caprichos (1799, Por que fue sensible). This is a fairly rare example of a Goya print entirely in aquatint.

In intaglio printmaking techniques such as engraving and etching, the artist makes marks into the surface of the plate (in the case of aquatint, a copper or zinc plate) that are capable of holding ink. The plate is inked all over then wiped clean to leave ink only in the marks. The plate is passed through a printing press together with a sheet of paper, and strong pressure applied pushing the paper into the marks, so that a transfer of the ink to the paper occurs. This is repeated many times to produce multiple "impressions" (copies).

Like etching, aquatint uses the application of a mordant (acid) to etch into the metal plate. Where etching uses a needle to scratch through an acid-proof resist and make lines, aquatint uses powdered rosin (resin) to create a tonal effect. The rosin is acid resistant and typically adhered to the plate by controlled heating; where the grains are will print white, with black areas around. The tonal variation is controlled by the level of mordant exposure over large areas, and thus the image is shaped by large sections at a time. The rosin is then washed off the plate before printing.

Various other substances than rosin have been used, including bitumen (asphalt). The necessary qualities are that the substance can be made into a powder, will resist acid, and can be fixed to the copper plate, usually by heating. The shallowness of the areas bitten by the acid accounts for the limited life of the plates, as the depressions in the copper are gradually flattened out.

Aquatint may be the only technique used on a plate, but is very often combined with a linear technique such as etching, especially for outlines, figures and buildings.

Another tonal technique, mezzotint, begins with a plate surface that is evenly indented and roughened so that it will print as an even and fairly dark tone of ink. The mezzotint plate is then smoothed and polished to make areas carry less ink and thus print a lighter shade. Alternatively, beginning with a smooth plate, areas are roughened to make them darker. Occasionally the two techniques of aquatint and mezzotint are combined.

== History ==
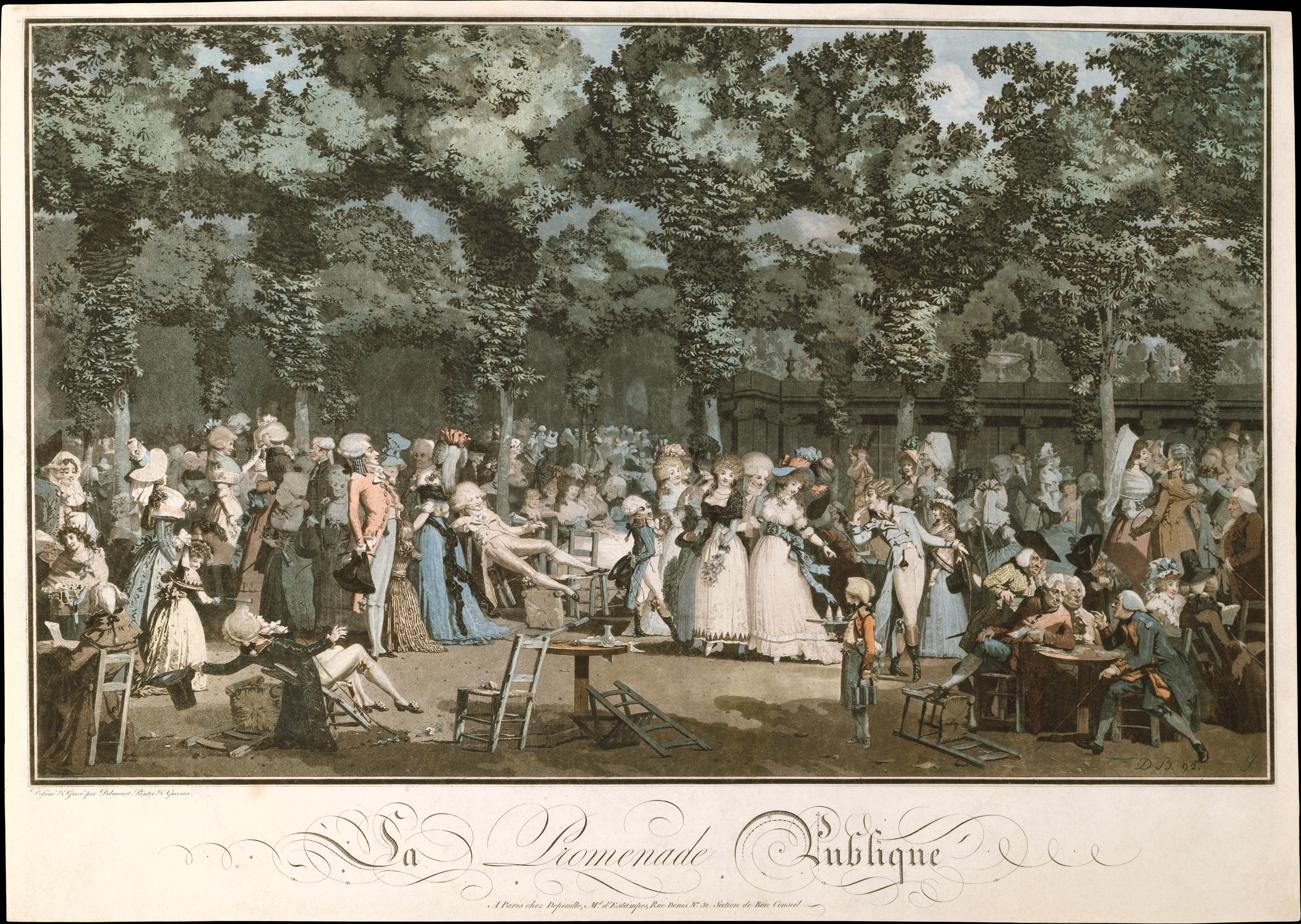
Philibert-Louis Debucourt, The Public Promenade, 1792. Printed in colour from various plates, using etching, engraving, and aquatint. One of the leading achievements of the French 18th-century colour-print.

=== Early history ===
A variety of early experiments aimed to add tonal effects to etching included the first use of a resin dust ground by the painter and printmaker Jan van de Velde IV in Amsterdam, around 1650. However, none of these developed a technique that caught on with other printmakers. Experimentation by several artists with somewhat different techniques reached a peak after about 1750, and as they were initially very secretive, the history of the emergence of the standard technique remains unclear.

Various claimants include the Swede Per Floding working with the Frenchman François-Philippe Charpentier in 1761, J. B. Delafosse in 1766, working with the amateur Jean-Claude Richard (often rather misleadingly known as the Abbé de Saint-Non) in 1766, and Jean-Baptiste Le Prince in 1768–69. Le Prince was more effective than the others in publicizing his technique, publishing Découverte du procédé de graver au lavis in 1780, though he failed to sell his secret in his lifetime. It was bought posthumously by the Académie royale de peinture et de sculpture in 1782, who released it on an open basis.

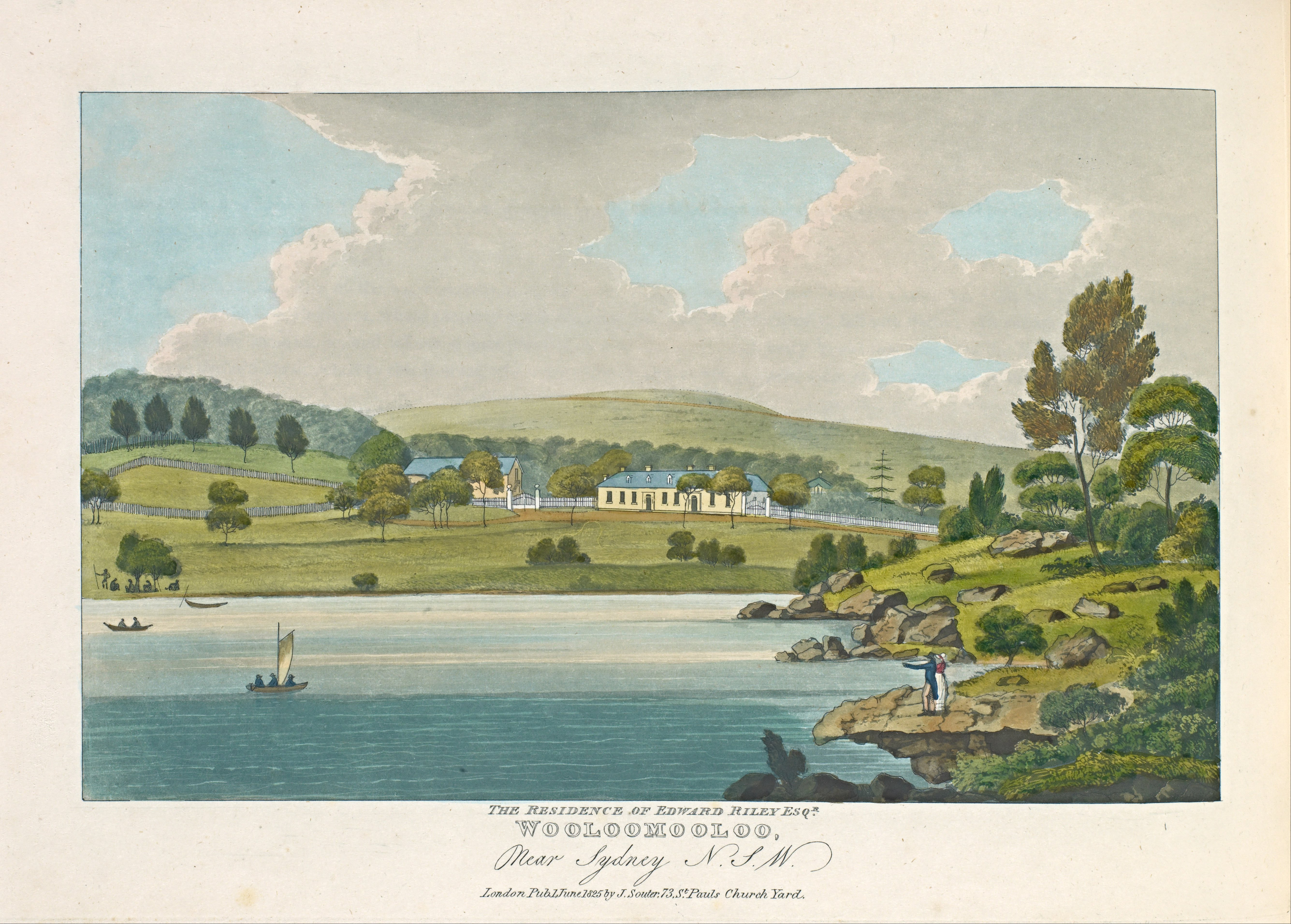
Joseph Lycett, The residence of Edward Riley Esquire, Wooloomooloo, Near Sydney N. S. W., 1825, hand-coloured aquatint and etching printed in dark blue ink. Australian print in the tradition of British decorative production. The artist had been transported for forging bank notes.

Though England was to become one of the countries using the technique most, the earliest English aquatints were not exhibited until 1772, by the cartographer Peter Perez Burdett. It was taken up by the watercolourist Paul Sandby, who also seems to have introduced technical refinements as well as inventing the name "aquatint". In England artists such as Sandby and Thomas Gainsborough were attracted by the suitability of etched outlines with aquatint for reproducing the popular English landscape watercolours, which at this period usually also had been given an initial outline drawing in ink. Publishers of prints and illustrations for expensive books, both important British markets at the time, also adopted the technique. In all these areas, a print with etching and aquatint gave very satisfactory results when watercolour was added by relatively low-skilled painters copying a model, with a flat wash of colour on top of the varied tones of the aquatint. After the French Revolution, one of the most successful publishers in London, the German Rudolf Ackermann, had numbers of French refugees working on the floor above his shop in The Strand in London, each brushing a single colour and then passing the sheet down a long table.

Over the same period in France there was sustained interest in techniques for true colour printing using multiple plates, which used multiple printmaking techniques which often included aquatint (or mezzotint) for tone. Artists included Jean-François Janinet and Philibert-Louis Debucourt, whose La Promenade Publique is often thought the masterpiece of the style. Another branch of this French movement mostly used mezzotint for tone and came to specialize in illustrating medical textbooks. This was at first led by Jacob Christoph Le Blon (1667–1741), who very nearly anticipated modern CMYK colour separation and then carried on by his pupil Jacques Fabien Gautier d'Agoty and later members of the d'Agoty family until around 1800.

Goya, maker of incontestably the greatest prints using aquatint, probably learned of the technique through Giovanni David from Genoa, the first significant Italian to use it. Goya used it, normally with etching and often burnishing and other techniques, in his great print series Los Caprichos (1799), Los Desastres de la Guerra (1810–1819), La Tauromaquia (1816) and Los disparates (c. 1816–1823).

=== Revival ===
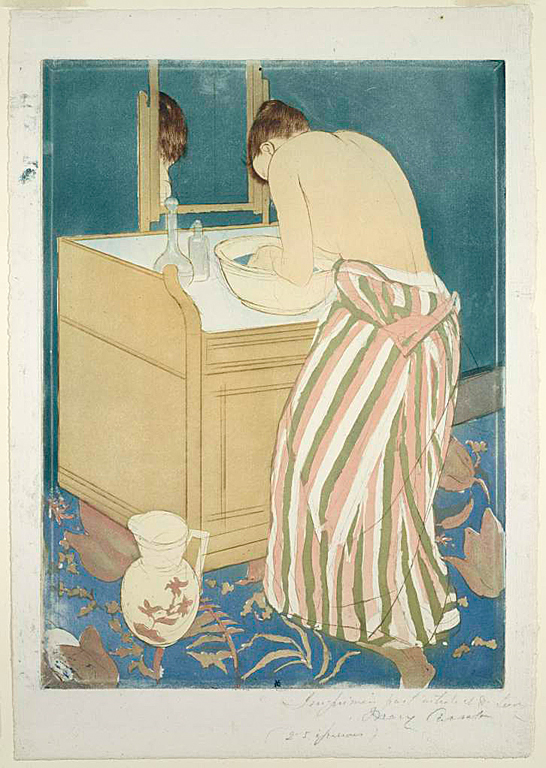
Mary Cassatt, Woman Bathing, drypoint and aquatint, from three plates, 1890–91

After a period of several decades in the central 19th century when the technique was little used, and definitively superseded for commercial uses, it was revived near the end of the century in France, by Édouard Manet, Félicien Rops, Degas, Pissarro, Jacques Villon and other artists. In 1891, Mary Cassatt, based in Paris, exhibited a series of highly original coloured drypoint and aquatint prints, including Woman Bathing and The Coiffure, inspired by an exhibition of Japanese woodblock prints shown there the year before. These used multiple blocks for the different colours. Cassatt was attracted to the simplicity and clarity of Japanese design, and the skillful use of blocks of colour. In her interpretation, she used primarily light, delicate pastel colours and avoided black (a "forbidden" colour among the Impressionists).

It continued to be used in the 20th century, with the Czech T. F. Šimon and the German Johnny Friedlaender notably frequent users. In the United States the printmaker Pedro Joseph de Lemos popularized aquatints in art schools with his publications (1919–1940), which simplified the cumbersome techniques, and with traveling exhibitions of his award-winning prints.

== Modern process ==
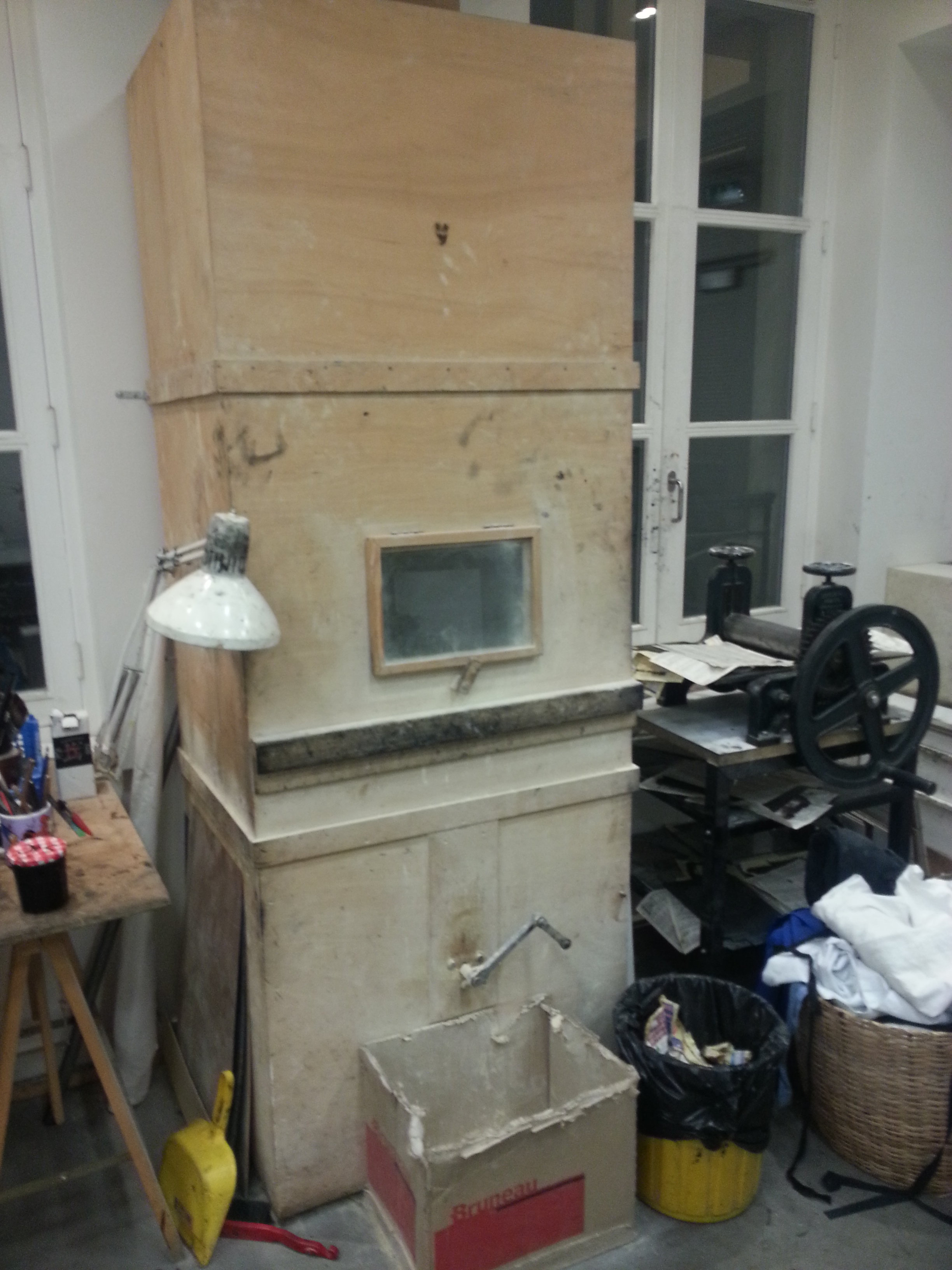
Aquatint box, used to apply resin powder on the plate.

An aquatint requires a metal plate, an acid, and something to resist the acid. Traditionally copper or zinc plates were used. The artist applies a ground that will resist acid. Ground is applied by dissolving powdered resin in spirits, by applying the powder directly to the surface of the plate, or by using a liquid acrylic resist. In all forms of etching the acid resist is commonly referred to as "the ground".

An aquatint box is used to apply resin powder. The powder is at the bottom of the box, a crank or a bellows is used to blow the powder up into the air of the box. A window allows the engraver to see the density of flowing powder and to place the plate in the box using a drawer. When the powder covers the plate, it can be extracted from the box for the next operations.

The plate is then heated; if the plate is covered with powder, the resin melts forming a fine and even coat; if it is in spirits, the spirits evaporate and the result is essentially the same. Now the plate is dipped in acid, producing an even and fine level of corrosion (the "bite") sufficient to hold ink. At this point, the plate is said to carry about a 50% halftone. This means that, were the plate printed with no further biting, the paper would display a gray color more or less directly in between white (no ink) and black (full ink).

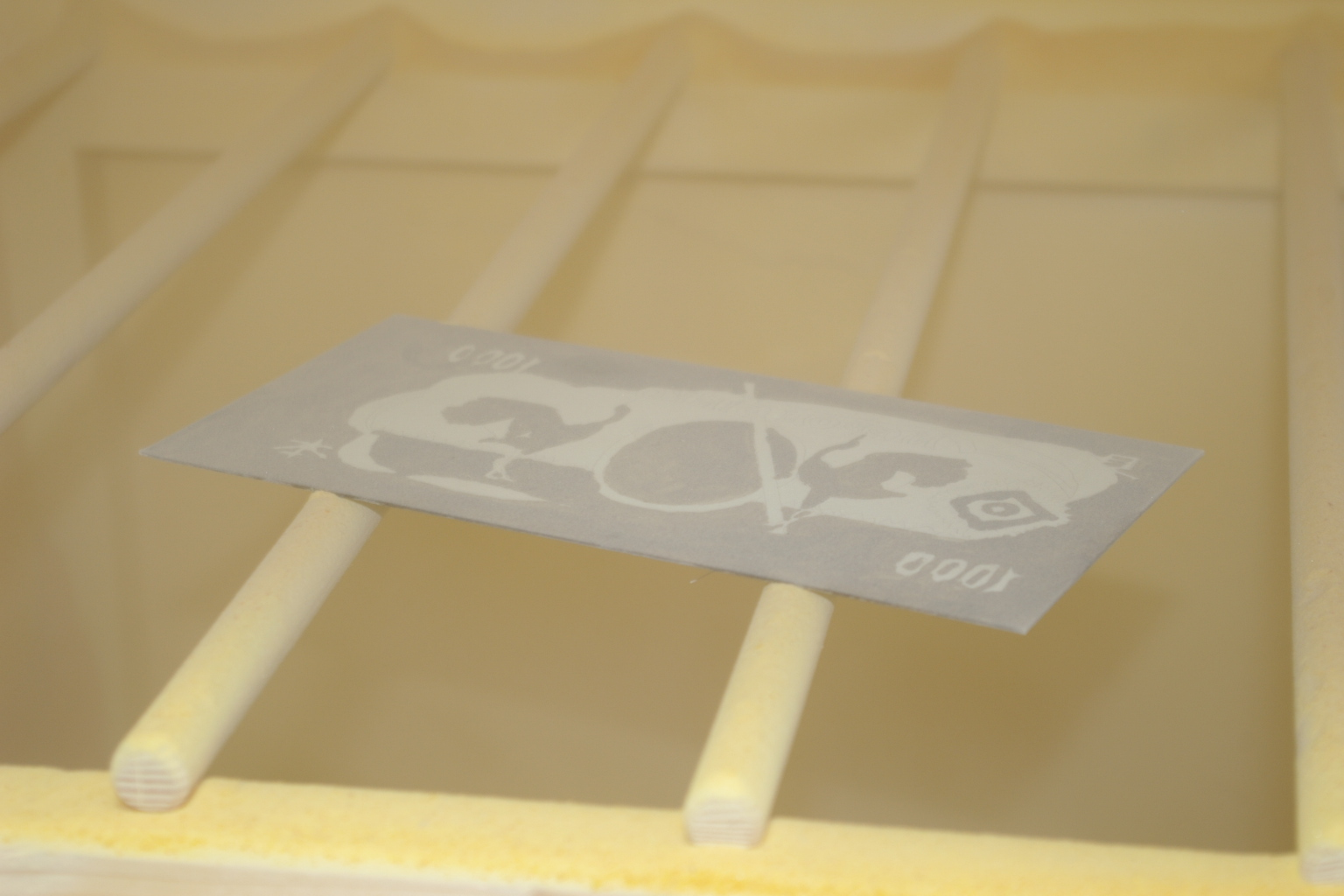
Zinc plate with powder resin.

At some point the artist will then etch an outline of any aspects of the drawing they wish to establish with line; this provides the basis and guide for the later tone work. They may also have applied (at the very start, before any biting occurs) an acid-resistant "stop out" (also called an asphaltum or hard ground) if they intend to keep any areas totally white and free of ink, such as highlights.

The artist then begins immersing the plate in the acid bath, progressively stopping out (protecting from acid) any areas that have achieved the designed tonality. These tones, combined with the limited line elements, give aquatints a distinctive, watery look. Also, aquatints, like mezzotints, provide ease in creating large areas of tone without laborious cross-hatching; but aquatint plates, it is noted, are generally more durable than mezzotint plates.

The first etch should be for a short period (30 seconds to 1 minute, with a wide variation depending on how light the lightest tones are meant to be). A test piece may be made with etching times noted, as the strength of the etchant will vary. More than thirty minutes should produce a very dark area. Etching for many hours (up to 24) will be as dark as etching for one hour, but the deep etch would produce raised ink on the paper.

Contemporary printmakers often use spraypaint instead of a powder, particularly when using the technique known as sugar-lift. To produce a printing surface using sugar-lift, the artist makes a solution of India ink and sugar by melting sugar into heated ink. This mixture is then applied to a prepared plate with a brush, allowing for a bold expression not possible with the most etching techniques. When the ink/sugar mixture is dry the plate is coated with asphaltum (liquid ground); the plate is then submerged in warm water which dissolves the sugar so that the image "lifts off" the plate. The exposed areas are then aquatinted to hold ink and the plate is ready to be printed from.

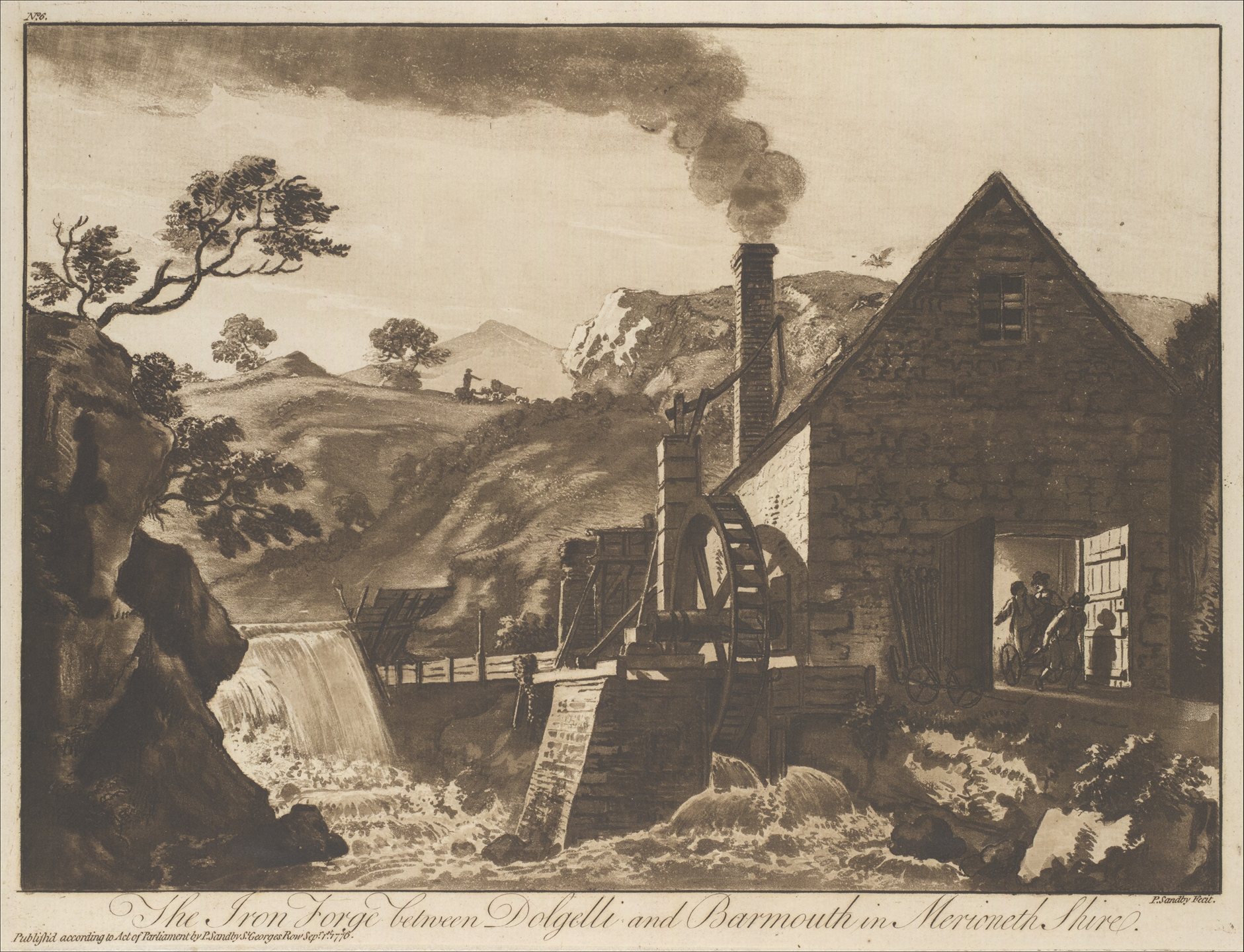
Paul Sandby, The Iron Forge between Dolgelli and Barmouth in Merioneth Shire, Plate 6 of XII Views in North Wales, 1776, etching and aquatint printed in brown.

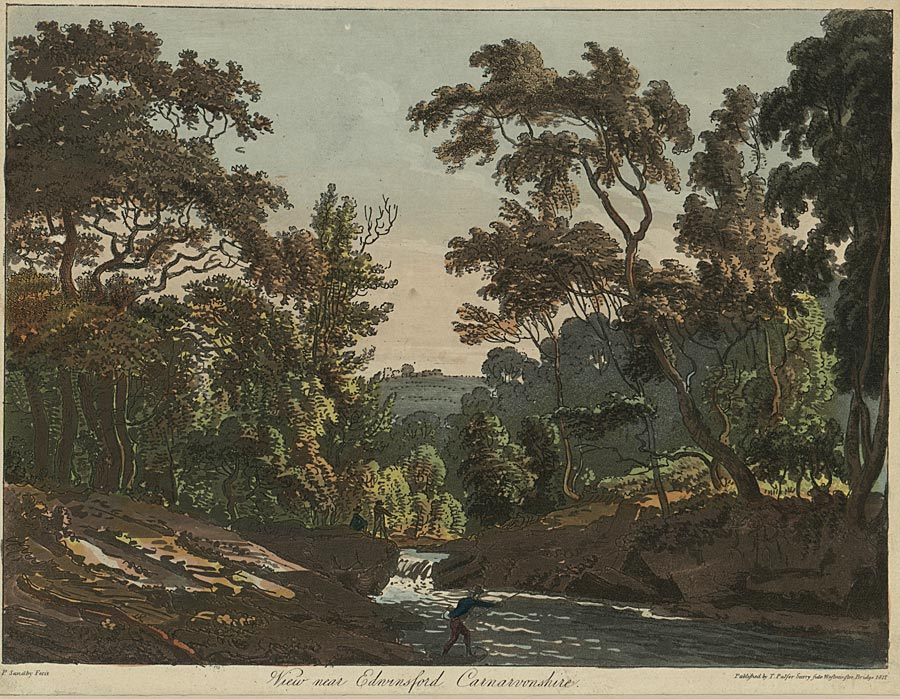
Paul Sandby, View near Edwinsford, Carnarvonshire, 1812, with colours added by hand.

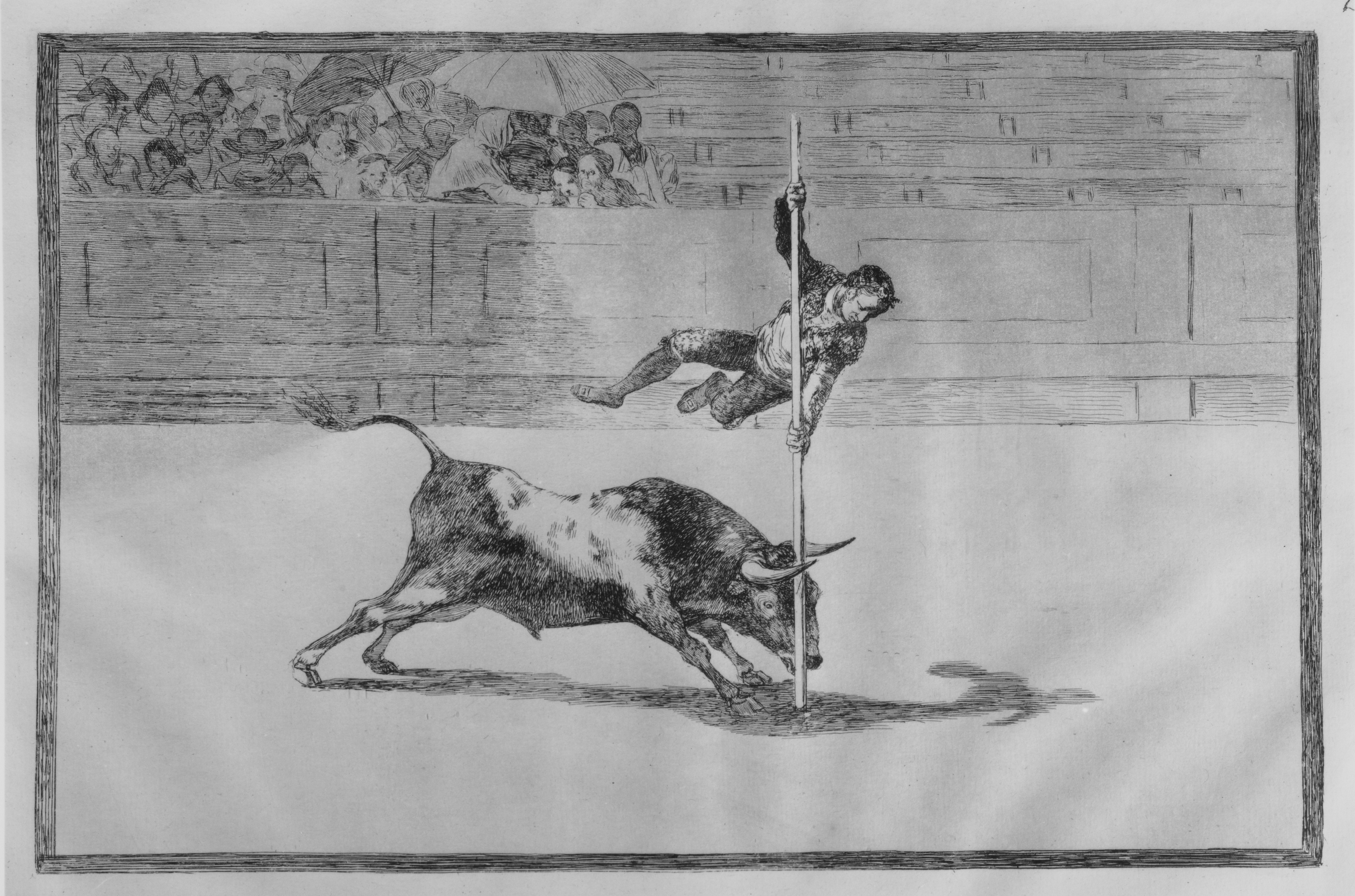
Goya, # 20 from the Tauromaquia series (1816), The agility and audacity of Juanito Apiñani in the ring at Madrid, etching and aquatint

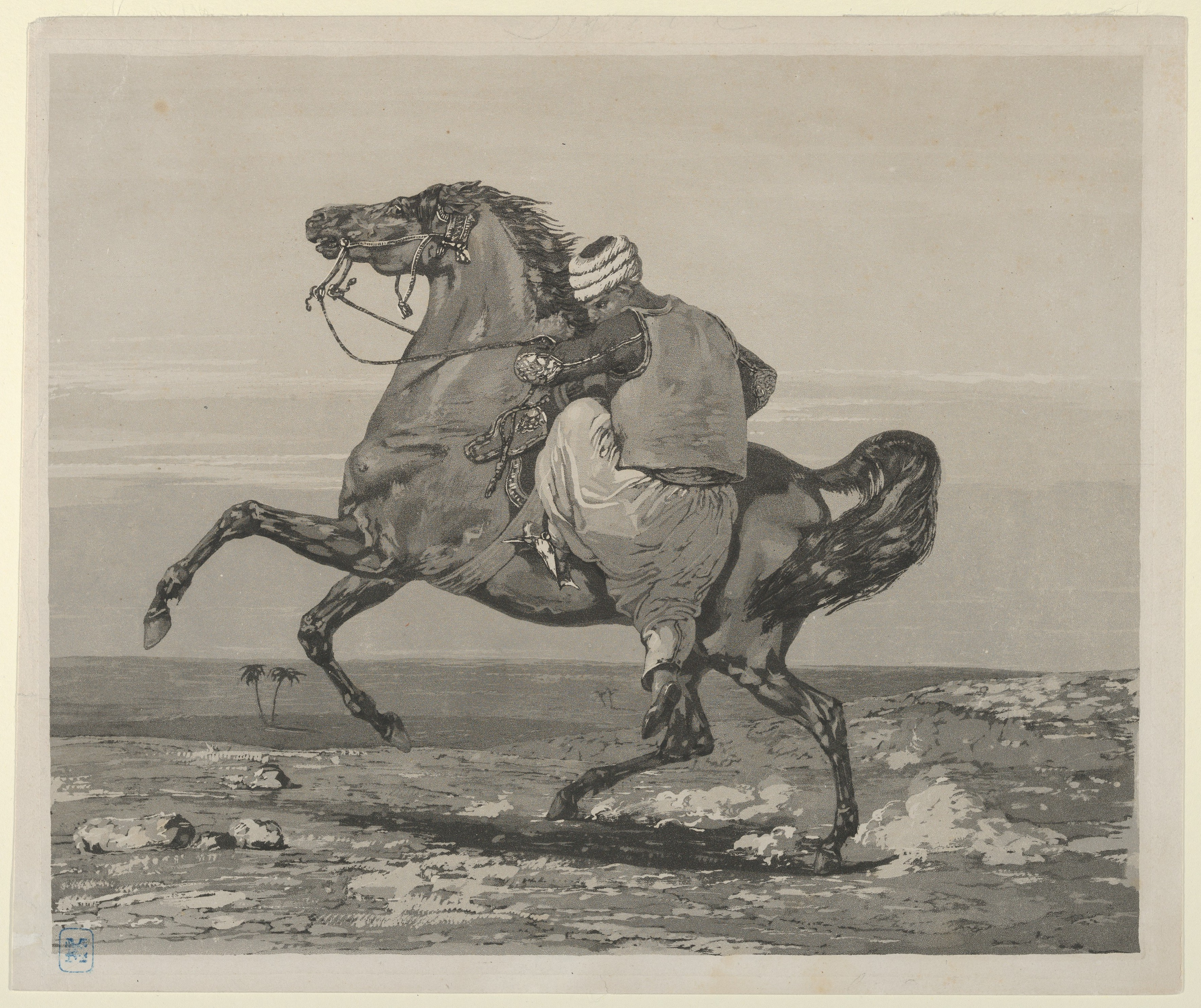
Eugène Delacroix, Turk Mounting His Horse, 1824, aquatint only.

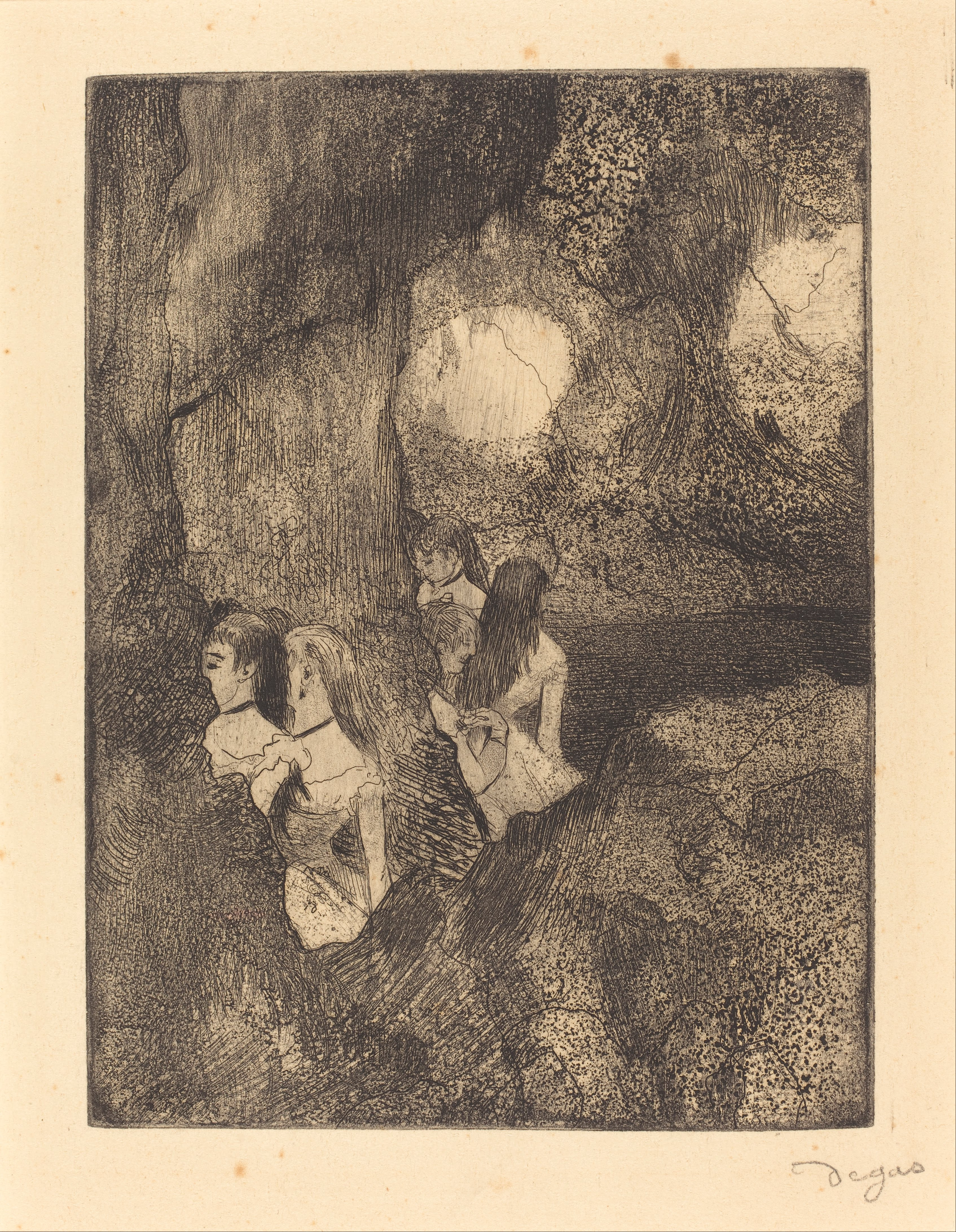
Edgar Degas, Dancers in the Wings (Danseuses dans la coulisse), c. 1877, etching, aquatint, and drypoint

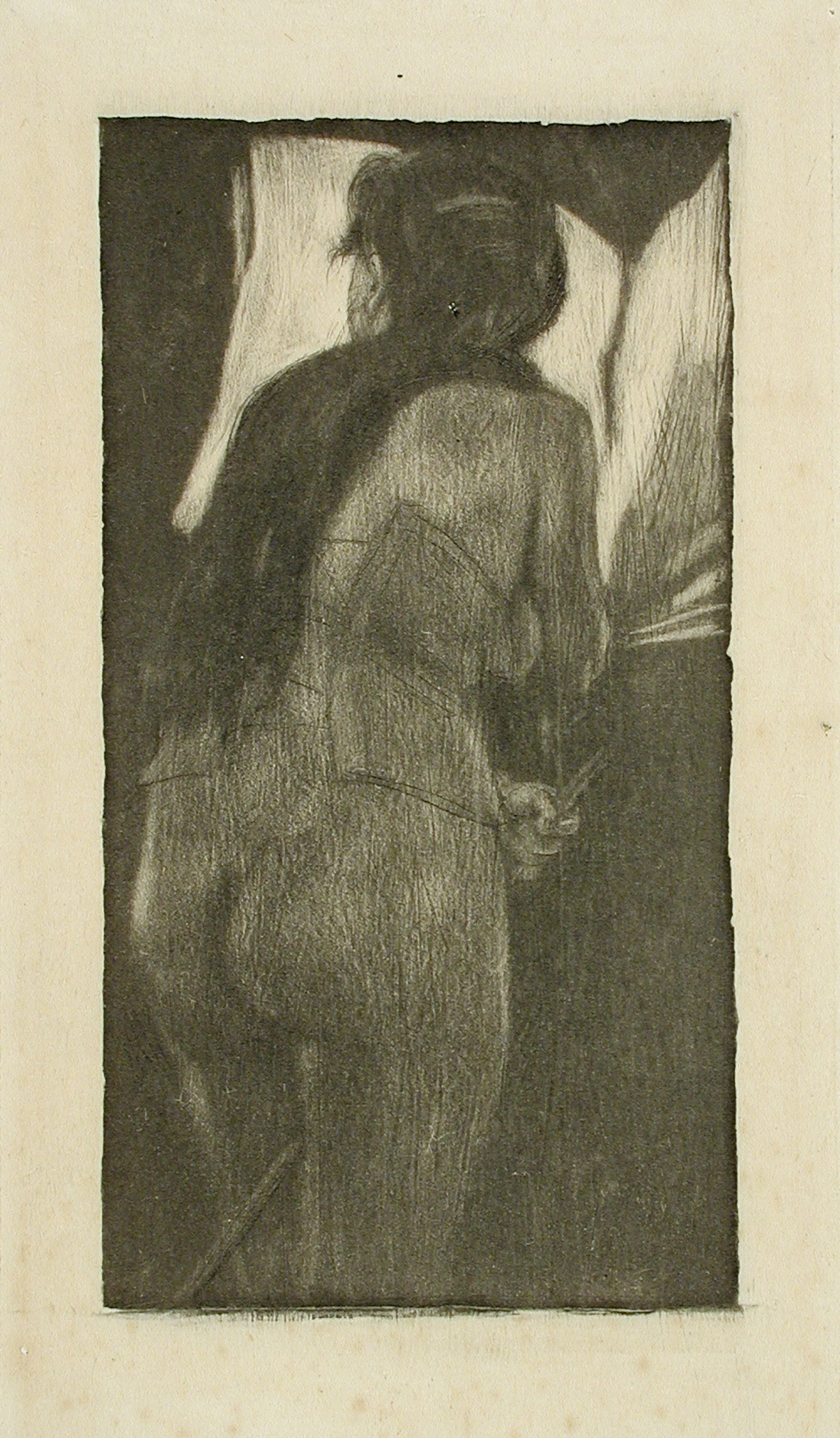
Félicien Rops, Little Sorceress, 1879, etching and aquatint

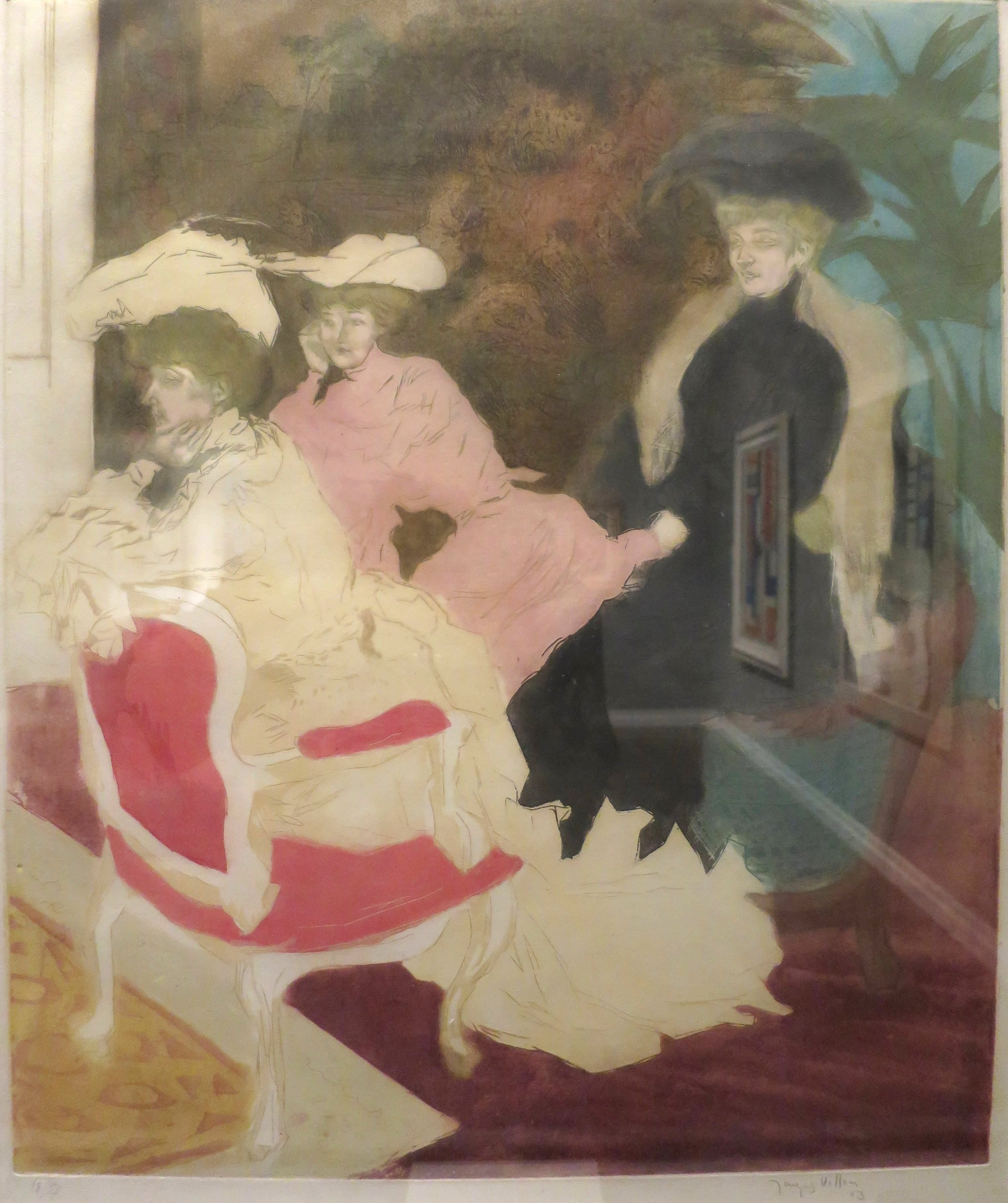
Comedy of Society, Jacques Villon

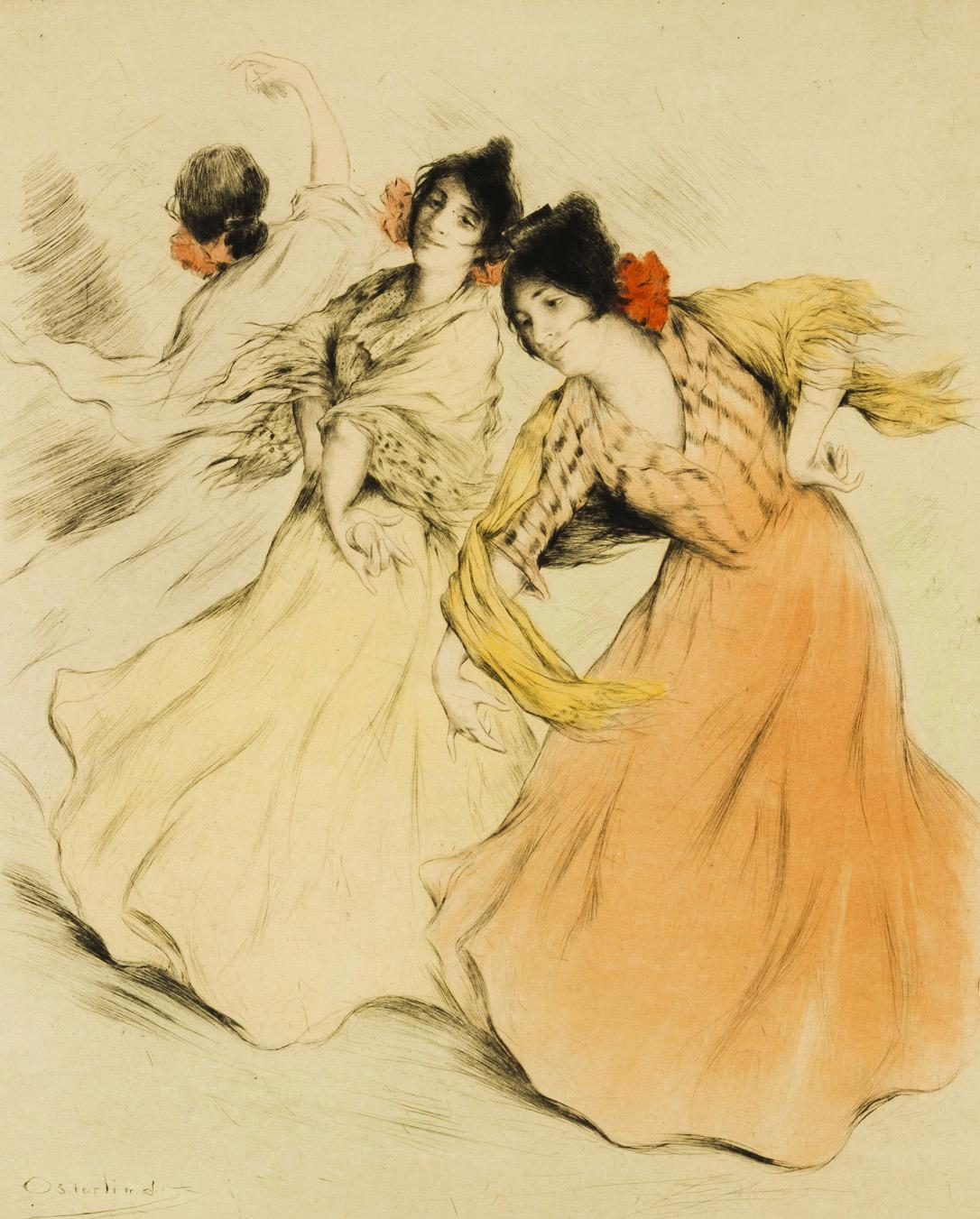
Allan Osterlind, Flamenco Dancers

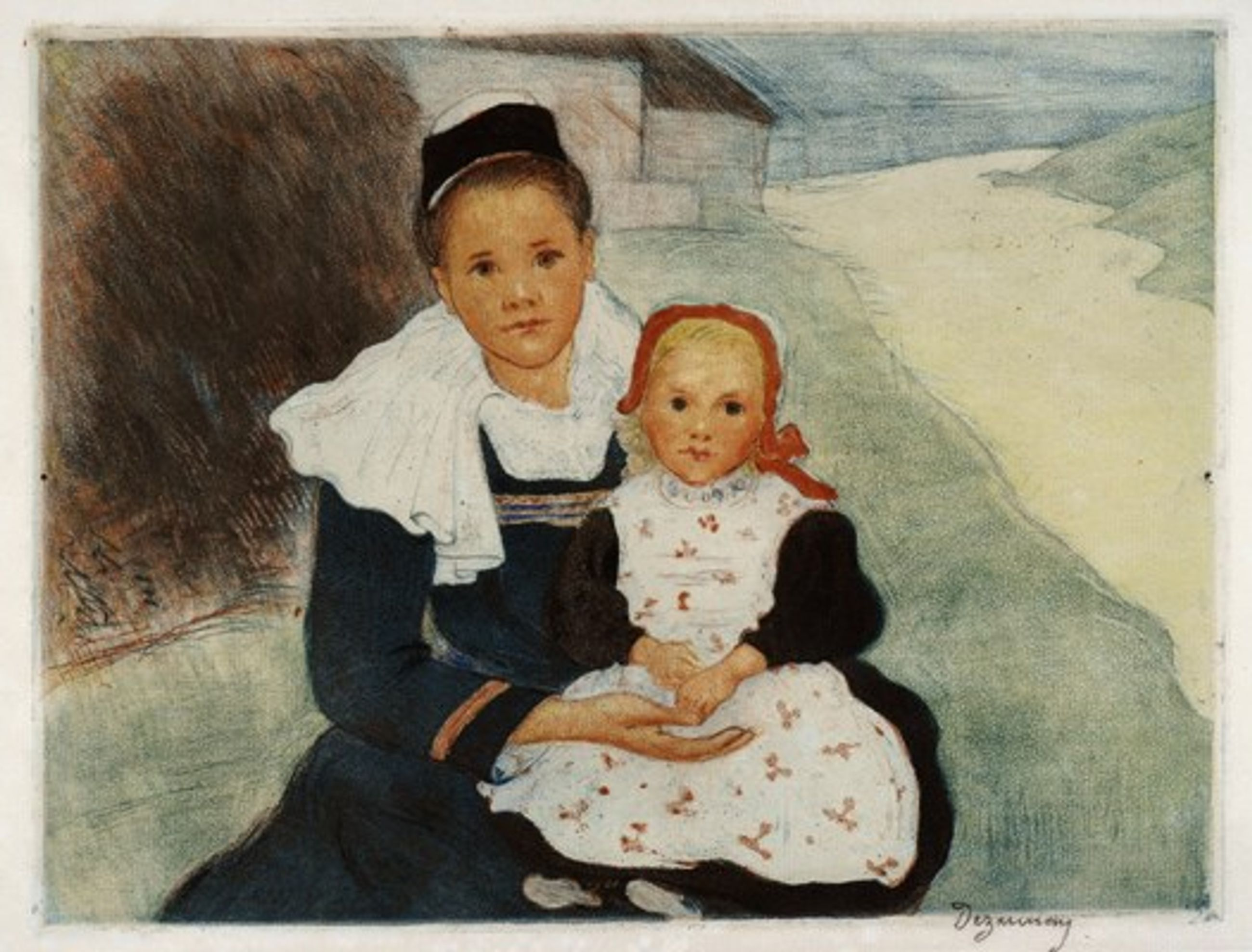
Émile Dezaunay

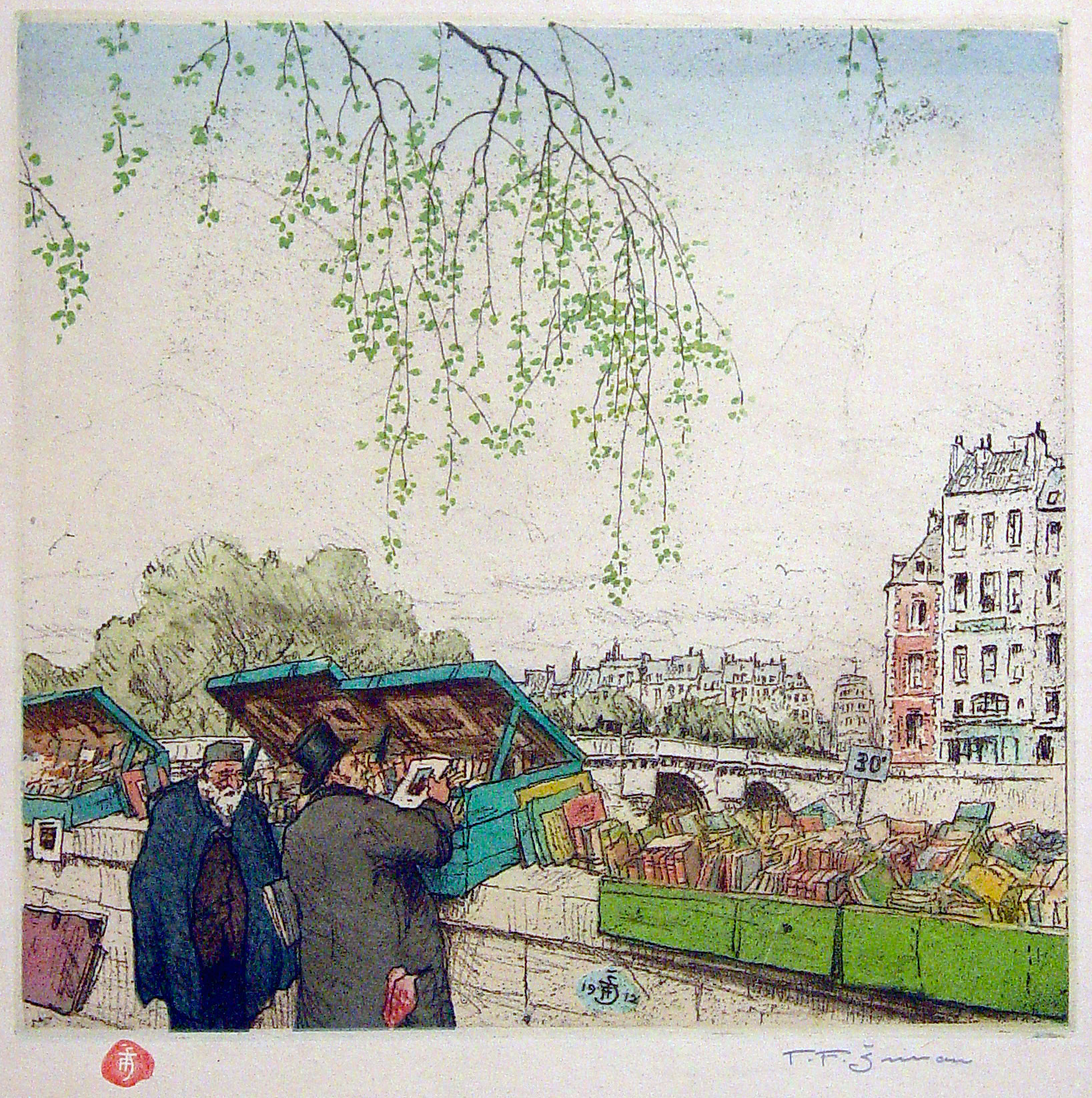
T. F. Šimon, Second Hand Booksellers, Spring (in Paris), 1912, colour soft ground etching and aquatint

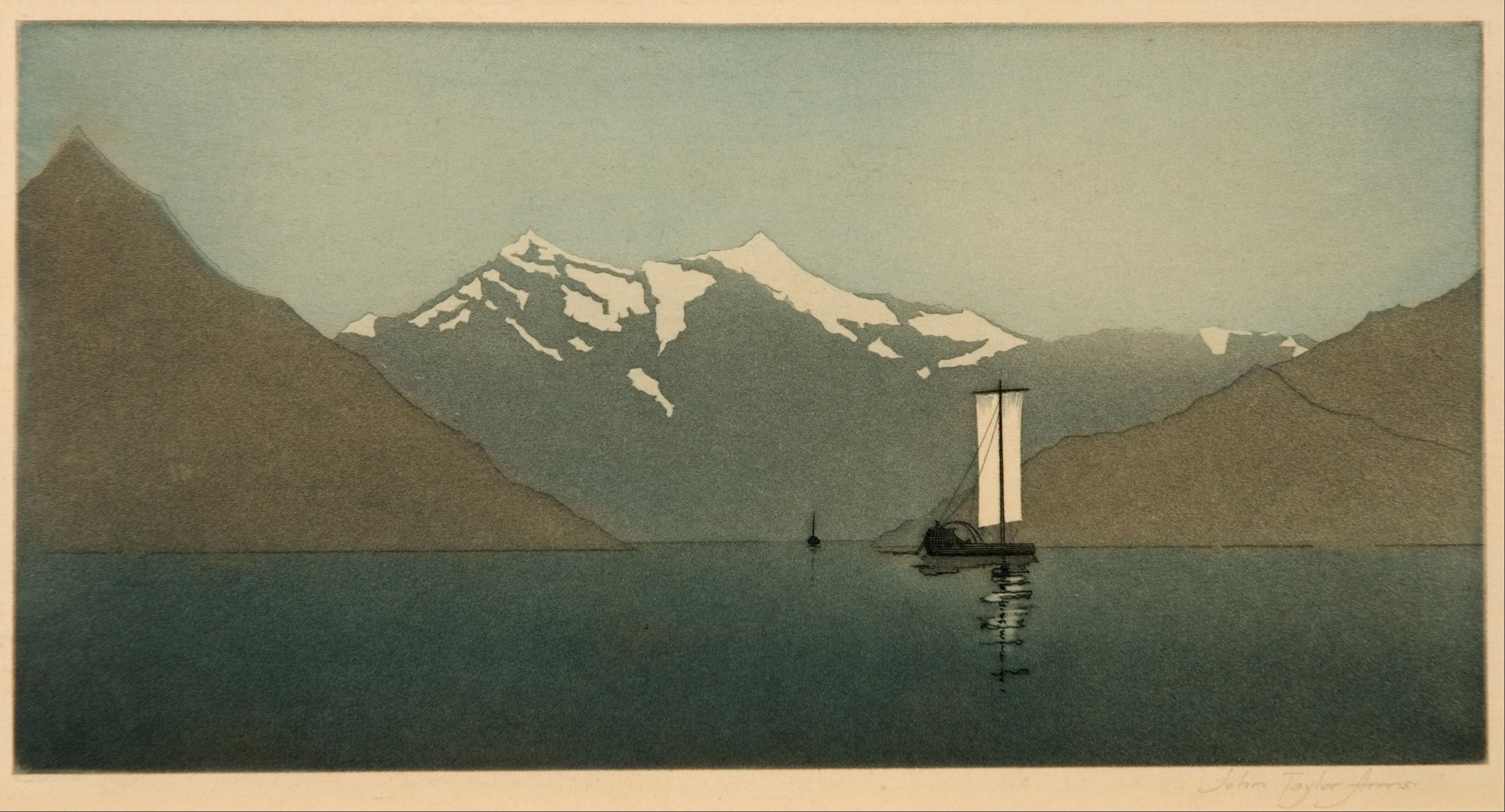
John Taylor Arms, On Lake Como, Number Two, 1919, colour printed etching and aquatint

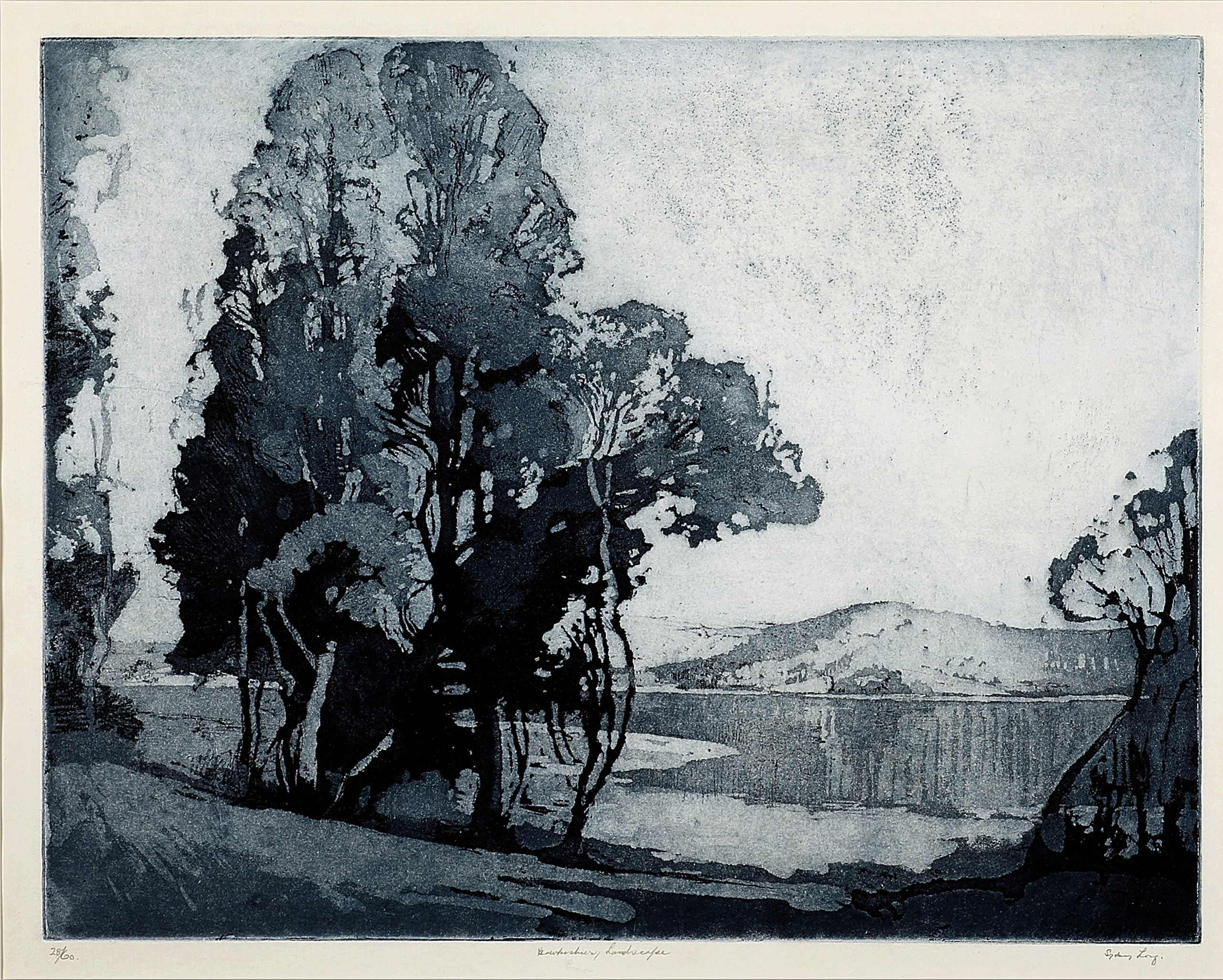
Sydney Long, Hawkesbury Landscape, са. 1928, аquatint printed in dark blue ink.

== Famous examples ==
- Francisco Goya famously took great advantage of aquatint printmaking, in his Los Caprichos series (1799); Los Desastres de la Guerra (1810–1819); La Tauromaquia (1816); and Los disparates (c. 1816–1823).
- Master engraver Robert Havell used aquatint for John James Audubon's Birds of America (1826–1838).
- David Hockney, known for his many paintings of the Los Angeles lifestyle in the 1960s, has created a number of aquatints and etchings used with color in his "The Blue Guitar" series of prints.
- La Belle Assemblée, a British women's magazine published from 1806 to 1837 had many aquatint colored plates.
