= Zeleznice =

Železnice may refer to:

- Slovenske železnice -Slovenian state railway
- Železnice Slovenskej republiky -Slovak state railway
- Železnice - a town in the northern Czech Republic.
