= Tavík František Šimon =

Czech artist (1877–1942)

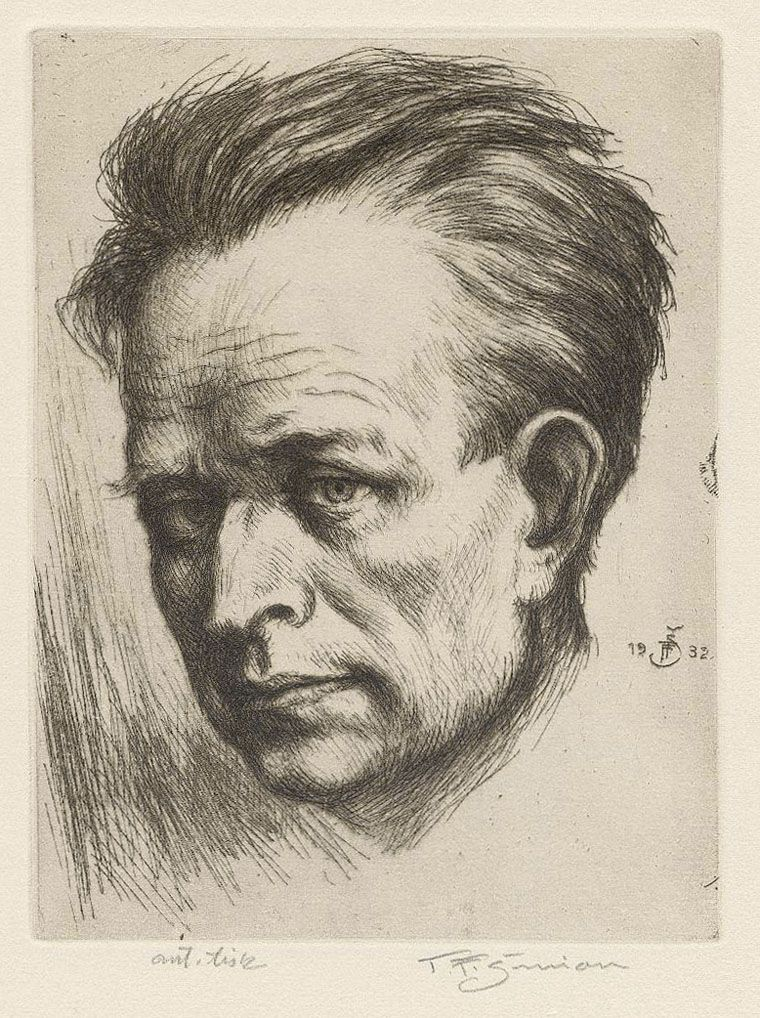
- Self portrait (1932), etching, 155x115 mm
- Born: 13 May 1877; Železnice, Austria-Hungary
- Died: 19 December 1942 (aged 65); Prague, Protectorate of Bohemia and Moravia
- Occupations: Painter, etcher, woodcut artist

Tavík František Šimon (13 May 1877 – 19 December 1942) was a Czech painter, etcher and woodcut artist. Born František Šimon, he later adopted the additional name 'Tavík', which was his mother's maiden name, generally signing his work T. F. Šimon. Largely ignored during the Communist era in Czechoslovakia, his work has received greater attention in recent years.

== Life and career ==
Šimon was born in Železnice in Bohemia, Austria-Hungary (now the Czech Republic). As a student at the Academy of Fine Arts, Prague, he received a stipend that allowed him to travel to Italy, Belgium, England and France. He had his first solo exhibition in Prague in 1905, and a Paris exhibition in 1906. His extensive travels would eventually also bring him to New York City, London, the Netherlands, Spain, Morocco, Ceylon (now Sri Lanka), India, and Japan, images of all of which appear in his work.

After spending 1904–1914 based in Paris, Šimon returned to Prague and became a professor at the Academy of Fine Arts in 1928. He married Vilma Kracík on 17 February 1906, in Prague. They had five children: Kamit (1906), Eva (1908), Ivan (1914) and Pavel (1920). In 1917, he became a founding member of the Hollar Association of Czech Graphic Artists, which he later chaired.

Many of his most notable images are of Prague, Amsterdam, New York, and Paris but also include portraiture and self-portraiture and images of the Czech and Slovak countryside. Šimon's style was strongly influenced by the French Impressionists and, perhaps through them, by Japanese printmaking techniques, in particular color aquatints with soft ground etching. Šimon was also a master of the mezzotint but completed very few prints in this difficult medium, most of them being female nudes in subtle tones of black.

== Voyage around the world 1926–1927 ==
Šimon was 49 years old when he undertook the journey of his lifetime, sailing literally around the world departing Cherbourg in September 1926 and travelling through the US, crossing the newly built Panama Canal to sail the Pacific to the Far East and then back home to Europe via Ceylon and the Middle East.

Tavík František Šimon, Morning Under the Brooklyn Bridge, 1927, Oil on panel. 12in. x 18in.

On his return, he compiled his correspondence and released the book Listy z cesty kolem světa (Letters from Around the World), published by J. Otto, Prague in 1928.

His notes and letters home reveal a world that was unknown by those in Old Europe – a new developing society in America, an evolving Empire in the Far East, and an untouched world in the island of Ceylon. His glimpses into the past provide with a view of history, through the eyes of a painter.

Arriving in New York, he wrote, "The ship's orchestra was playing as we slowly approached the port of New York City in the morning. In the distance we could see the outlines of skyscrapers drowning in a silver haze then, as we came closer, rising and standing, etched against the shimmering background of the rising sun. A shiver went up and down my spine as we entered the huge harbour whose backdrop of slim buildings was interspersed with the rising smoke from factories".

In 2014 his book was translated and published for the first time in English as Letters from a Voyage Around the World with an introduction by the artist's grandson, Michal Šimon.

Šimon died on 19 December 1942 in Prague at the age of 65 of a stroke.

== Gallery ==
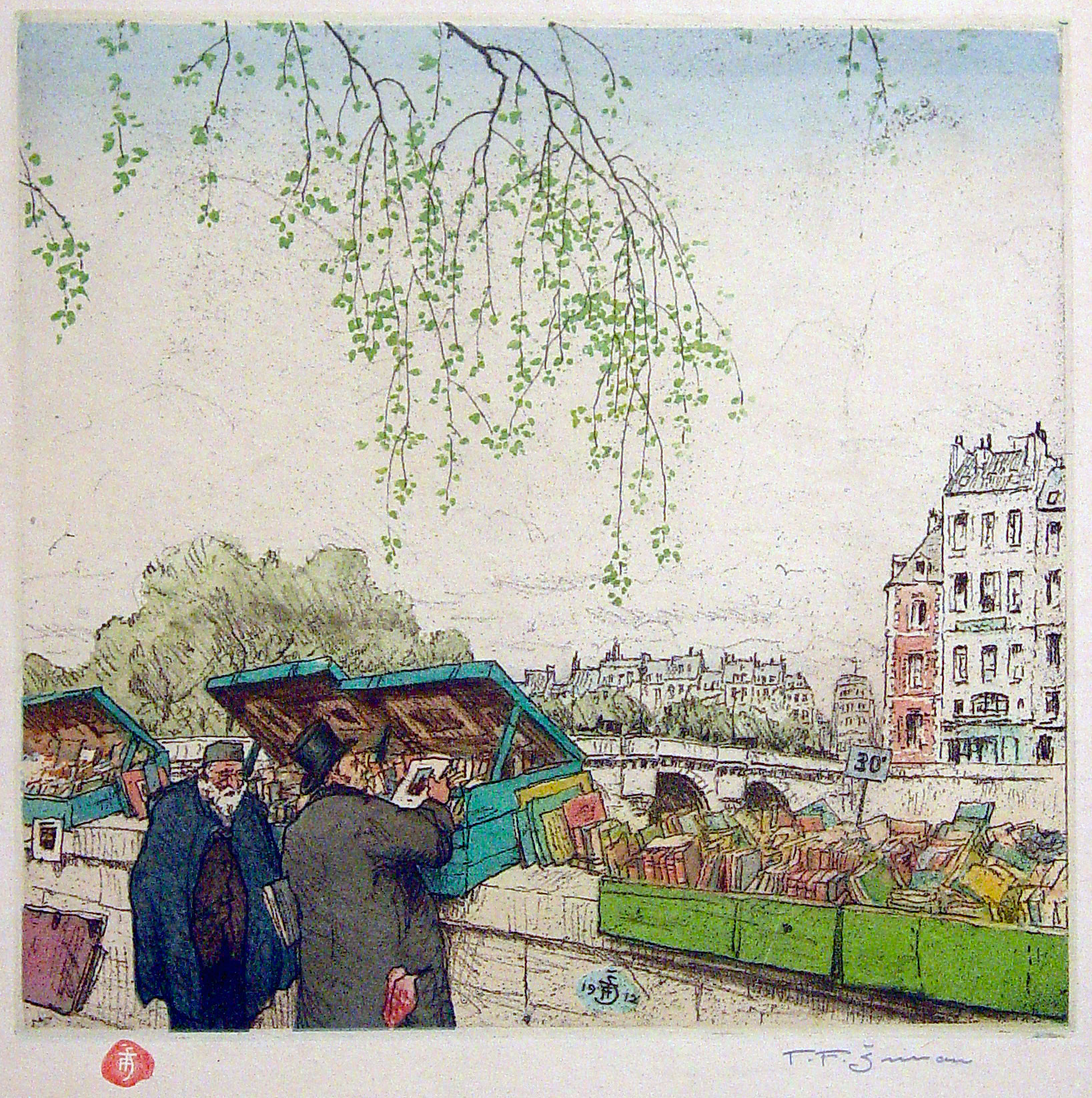
"Second Hand Booksellers, Spring", 1912, by Šimon

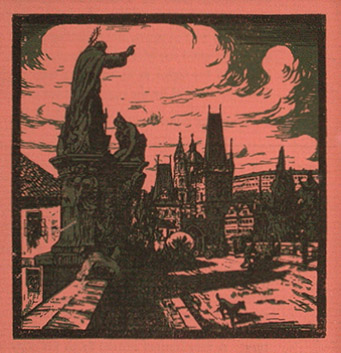
"View in Old Prague", woodcut, 1930

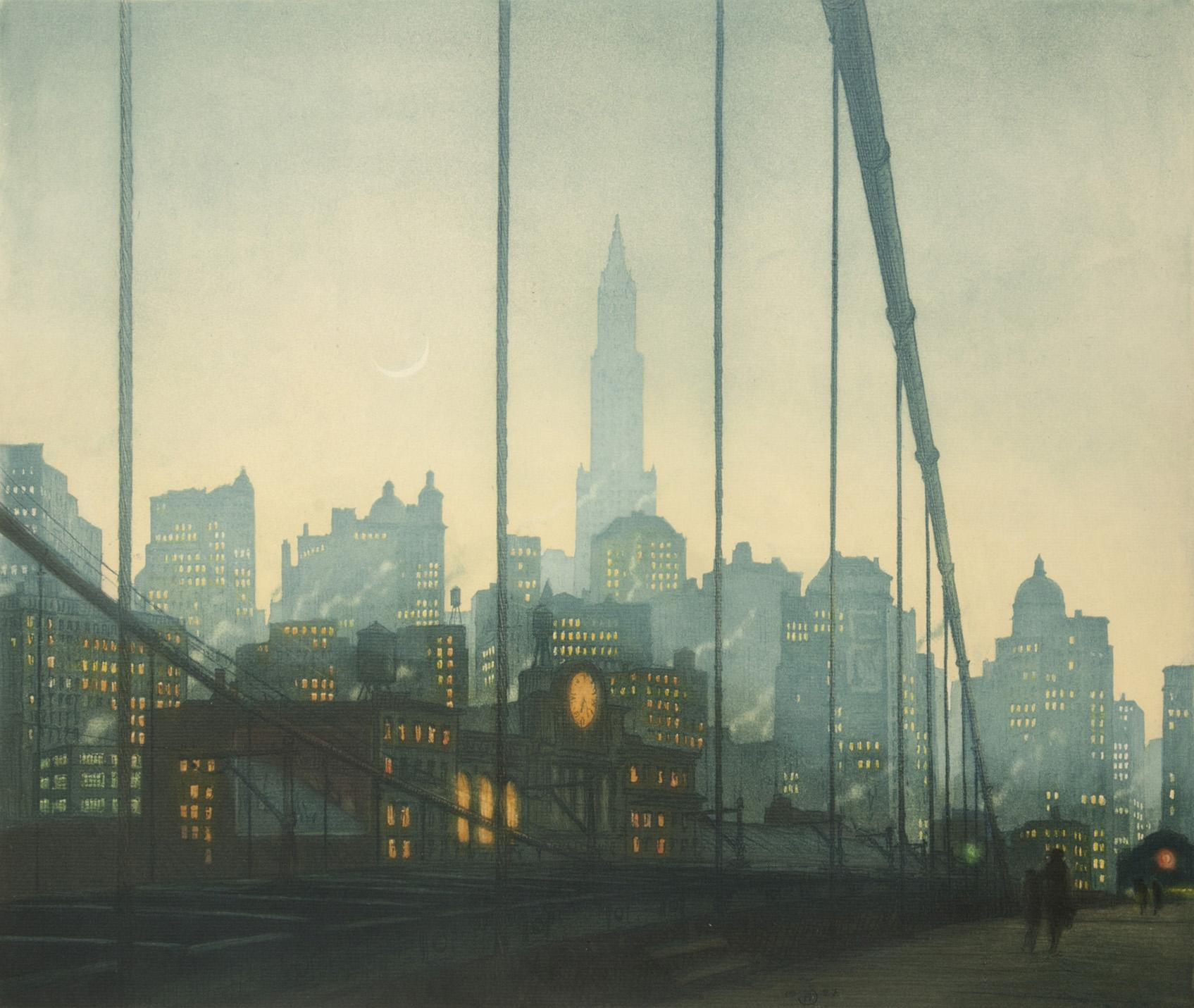
New York. Etching and aquatint

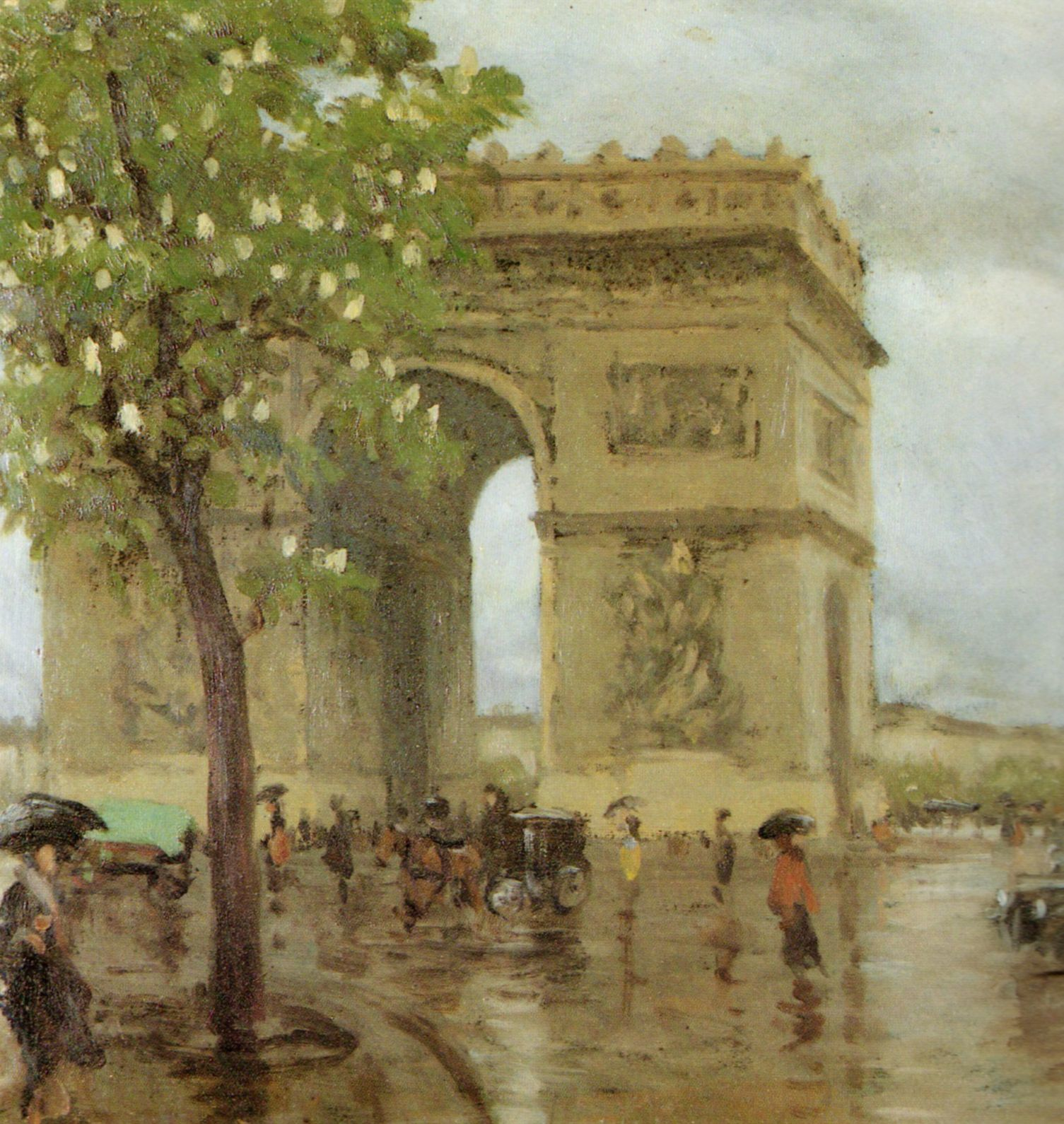
Place de L'étoile, oil on cardboard

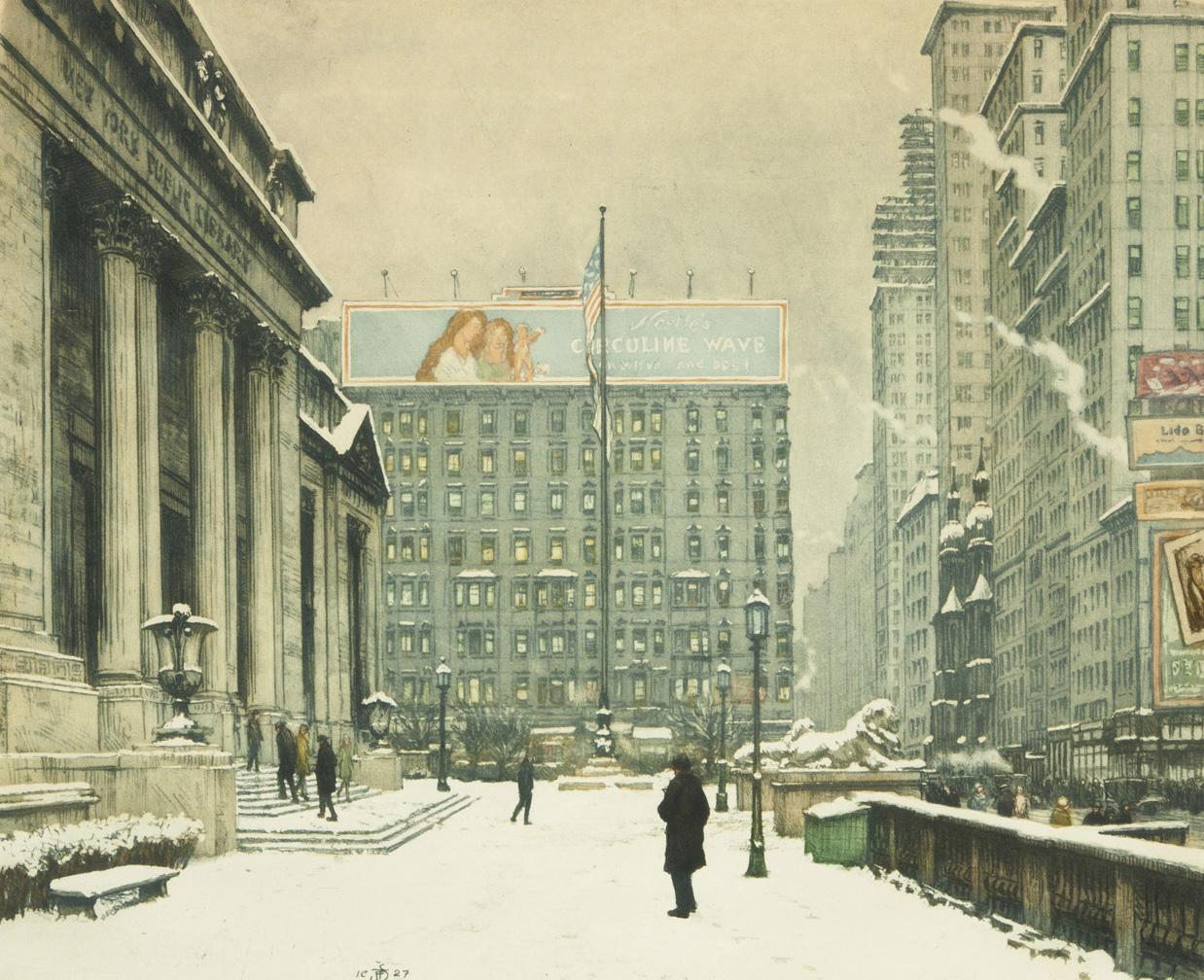
New York Public Library, signed in pencil lower right

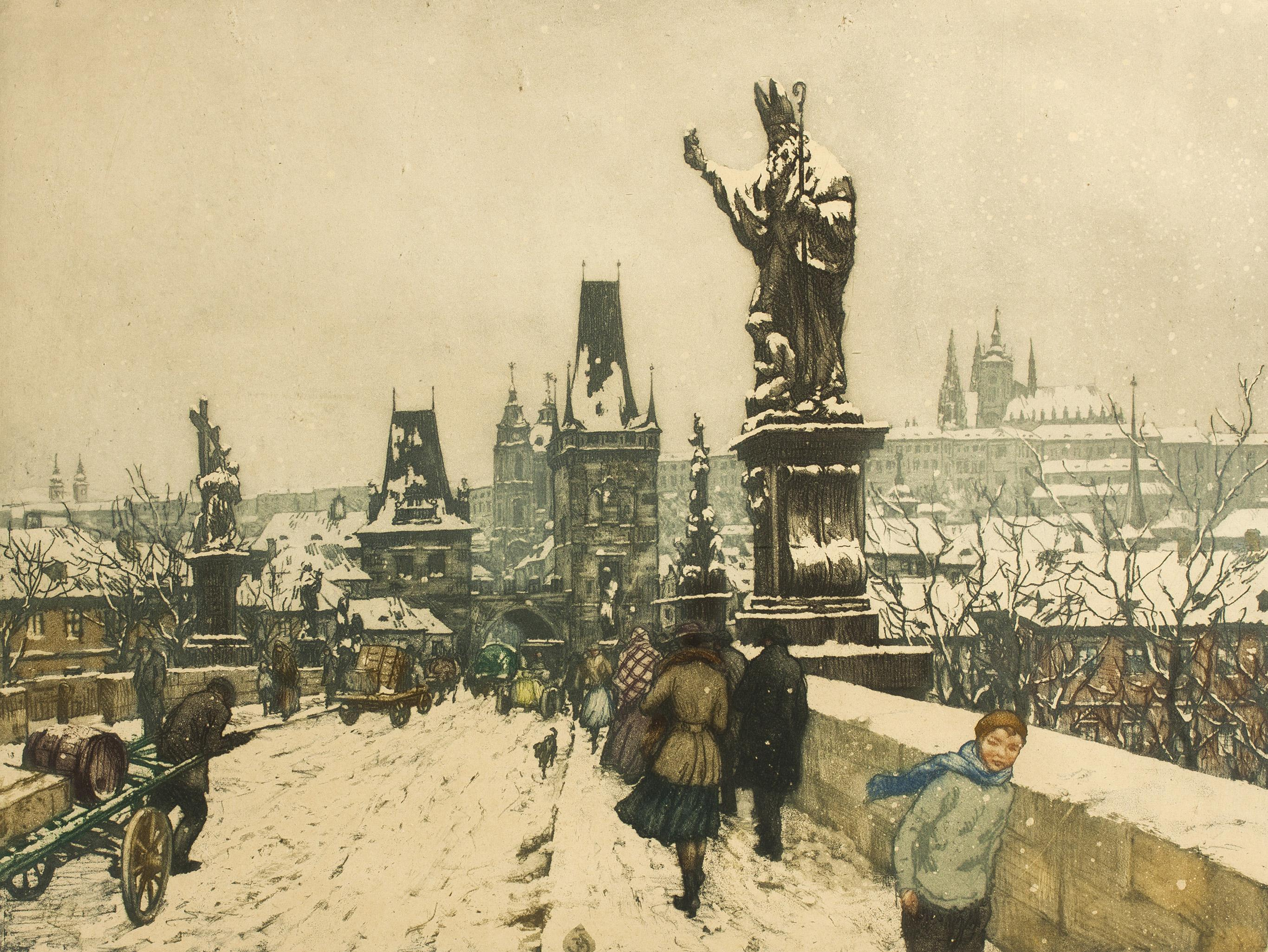
The Prague Castle from Charles Bridge in winter, signed in pencil lower right

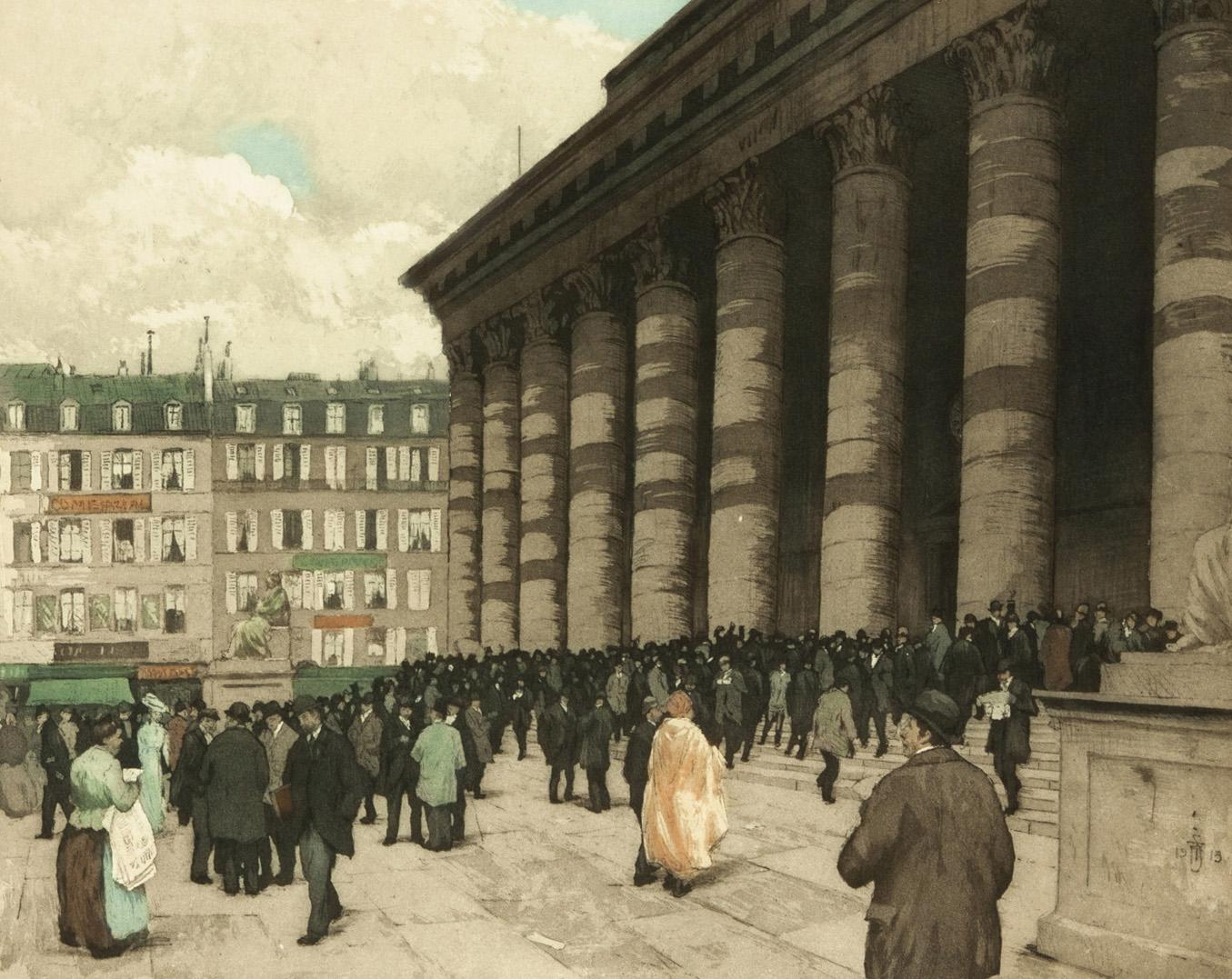
The Paris stock exchange, signed lower right in pencil

== Sources ==
- Scot A. Campbell, The Graphic Work of T.F. Šimon, Frederick Baker Inc, Chicago (2002)
- T.F.Šimon, 'Příručka umělce - Grafika', Jan Stenc, 1921 ('Artists handbook - Graphics')
- T.F.Šimon, 'Listy z cesty kolem světa', J.Otto, 1928 ('Journal from my travels around the world')
- T.F.Šimon, introduction by Michal Šimon, 'Letters from a Voyage Around the World', D.Pearson, Australia. 2014
- Catharine Bentinck, 'In the Footsteps of Tavík František Šimon' Kontexty, Czech Republic. 2014.
- Catharine Bentinck, 'T.F.Šimon - Catalogue Raisonné and Biographical Sketch. Private Publication. 2015.
- Catharine Bentinck, 'Tavík František Šimon in Ceylon'. Drawings, prints and paintings of Šimon's stay in Ceylon. Private Publication. 2017.
