= Železnice =

- Town
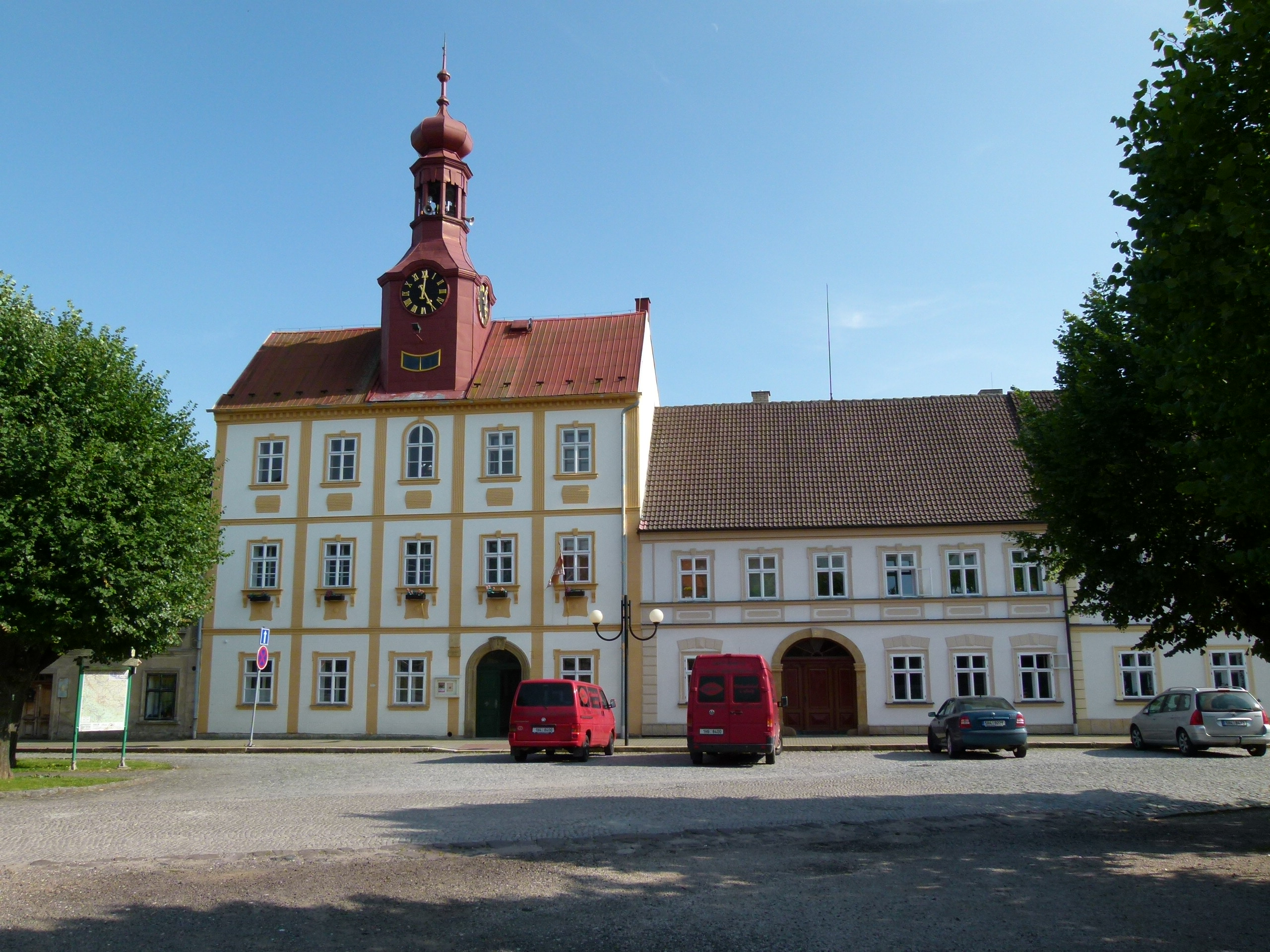
- Town square with the town hall

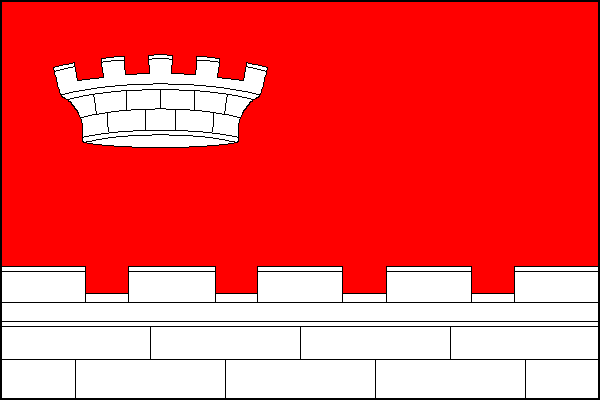
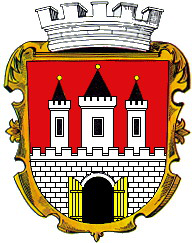
- Flag Coat of arms

- Location in the Czech Republic
- Coordinates: 50°28′22″N 15°23′5″E
- Country: Czech Republic
- Region: Hradec Králové
- District: Jičín
- First mentioned: 1318

Government
  - Mayor: Dana Kracíková

Area
  - Total: 13.09 km^{2} (5.05 sq mi)
- Elevation: 321 m (1,053 ft)

Population (2026-01-01)
  - Total: 1,435
  - Density: 109.6/km^{2} (283.9/sq mi)
- Time zone: UTC+1 (CET)
  - Summer (DST): UTC+2 (CEST)
- Postal code: 507 13
- Website: www.zeleznice.net

Železnice (Czech pronunciation: [ˈʒɛlɛzɲɪtsɛ]; German: Eisenstadtel) is a town in Jičín District in the Hradec Králové Region of the Czech Republic. It has about 1,400 inhabitants. The historic town centre is well preserved and is protected as an urban monument zone.

== Administrative division ==
Železnice consists of seven municipal parts (in brackets population according to the 2021 census):

- Železnice (1,109)
- Březka (10)
- Cidlina (72)
- Doubravice (24)
- Pekloves (10)
- Těšín (42)
- Zámezí (37)

== Etymology ==
The name Železnice is derived from the Czech adjective železná, meaning 'iron'. The word železnice also means 'railway' in modern Czech.

== Geography ==
Železnice is located about 4 kilometres (2 mi) north of Jičín and 42 km (26 mi) northwest of Hradec Králové. It lies mostly in the Jičín Uplands. The northern part of the municipal territory belongs to the Ještěd–Kozákov Ridge and includes the highest point of Železnice, the hill Hůra at 519 m (1,703 ft) above sea level. The Cidlina River flows through the rural part of the territory. There are several small fishponds around the town.

== History ==
The first written mention of Železnice is from 1318. In 1514, it was referred to as a market town, and probably in 1599, it was promoted to a town. In 1788 and 1826, the town was badly damaged by large fires. In 1903, the railway through Železnice was built.

== Demographics ==
Historical population

Year	Pop.	±%
1869	2,439	—
1880	2,449	+0.4%
1890	2,348	−4.1%
1900	2,156	−8.2%
1910	2,065	−4.2%

Year	Pop.	±%
1921	1,892	−8.4%
1930	1,738	−8.1%
1950	1,427	−17.9%
1961	1,486	+4.1%
1970	1,352	−9.0%

Year	Pop.	±%
1980	1,195	−11.6%
1991	1,109	−7.2%
2001	1,098	−1.0%
2011	1,279	+16.5%
2021	1,304	+2.0%

Source: Censuses

== Transport ==
Železnice is located on the railway line Hradec Králové–Turnov.

== Sights ==
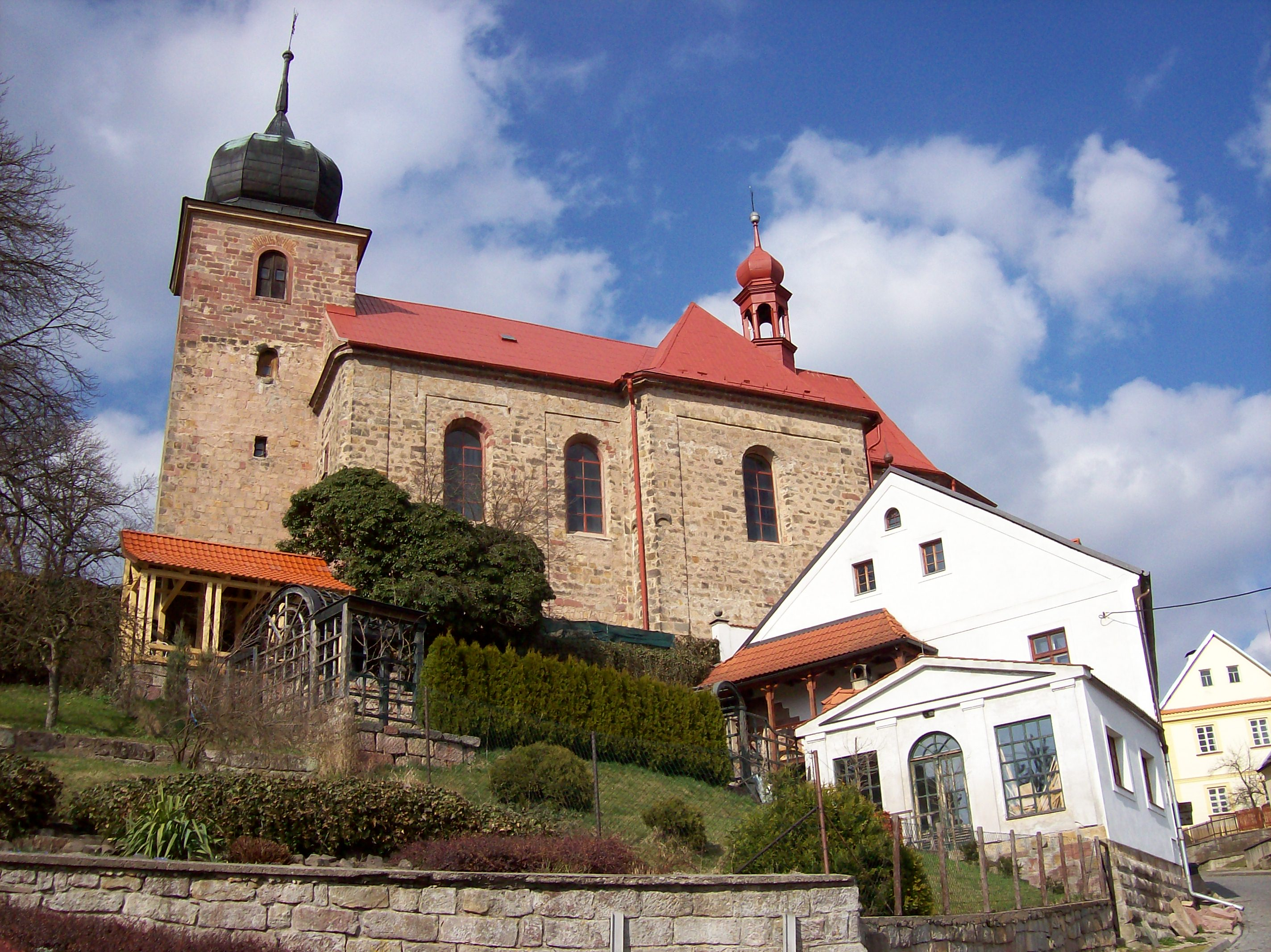
Church of Saint Giles

After the fire in 1826, the town buildings in the historic centre were restored in a unified Neoclassical style. This buildings has mostly been preserved to this day and forms a unique urban complex. The town hall was built in 1826.

The Church of Saint Giles was built on the site of an old Romanesque church from the 13th century after it was destroyed during the Thirty Years' War, and rebuilt in the Baroque style in 1727–1739.

== Notable people ==
- Tavík František Šimon (1877–1942), painter, etcher and woodcutter

== Twin towns – sister cities ==
Železnice is twinned with:

- Revò, Italy
