= Venus Consoling Love =

Painting by François Boucher

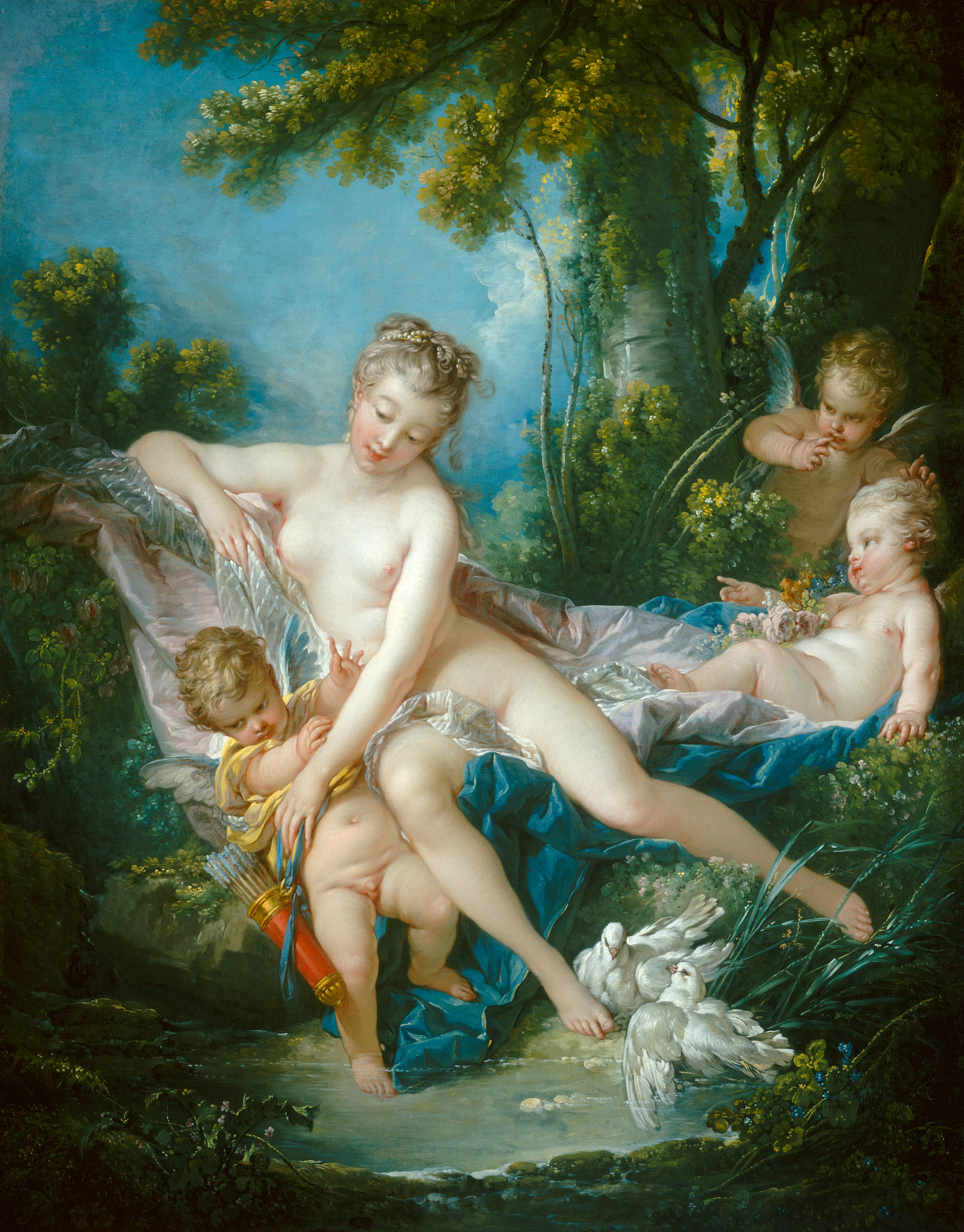
- Artist: François Boucher
- Year: 1751
- Medium: Oil on canvas
- Dimensions: 107 cm × 84.8 cm (42 in × 33.4 in)
- Location: National Gallery of Art; Washington, D.C.

Venus Consoling Love is an oil-on-canvas painting executed in 1751 by the French artist François Boucher. The painting depicts a mythological scene, where Venus, the goddess of Love, depicted as a charming and supple young woman, is impersonating the French Rococo's beauty ideals. She is about to disarm Cupid, by taking away his arrows, that he uses when shooting at people to make them fall in love.

"In Enlightenment France the dedicated search to define truth engendered a re–evaluation of the natural. The belief that it was right to follow nature, and that the pursuit of pleasure was natural, influenced the prevailing conception of the nude ...

Venus sits beside the pond with doves, the goddess symbol. The white doves at her feet, her complexion, the pearls in her hair are just as luxurious like the silk draperies that were wrapped around her, but now are lying on the ground. Boucher painted the artwork with soft pastel tones using a dim silvery light. The painting was made with high technical skill. The principal charm of Rococo art is its sensuality and seductivity.

== History ==
The painting belonged to Mme de Pompadour, the French king's mistress, displayed at Château de Bellevue, who commissioned it, and it was Madame de Pompadour who allegedly posed for the painting. Artists liked to work for her not only for the prestige of working for the aristocracy, but also because she paid her bills regularly. It has even been suggested that Boucher's young wife was the young woman posing for the figure of Venus, but it is more a soft and appealing essence of feminine beauty, that appears in front of us in the figure of the Venus painted by the French artist Boucher.
