= Jean-François Janinet =

French engraver and balloonist (1752–1814)

Jean-François Janinet (1752–1814), sometimes called François Janinet, was a French engraver and balloonist.

== Sources ==
- Barbin, Madeleine (2003). "Janinet, Jean-François". In Grove Art Online. Oxford University Press. Oxford Art Online.
- Raineau, Joëlle (2021). "Janinet, Jean-François". In Beyer, Andreas; Savoy, Bénédicte; and Tegethoff, Wolf (eds.). Allgemeines Künstlerlexikon Online. De Gruyter.
- "Janinet, Jean François". In Benezit Dictionary of Artists. Oxford University Press, Oxford Art Online, 2011.
