= Ange-Jacques Gabriel =

French architect (1698–1782)

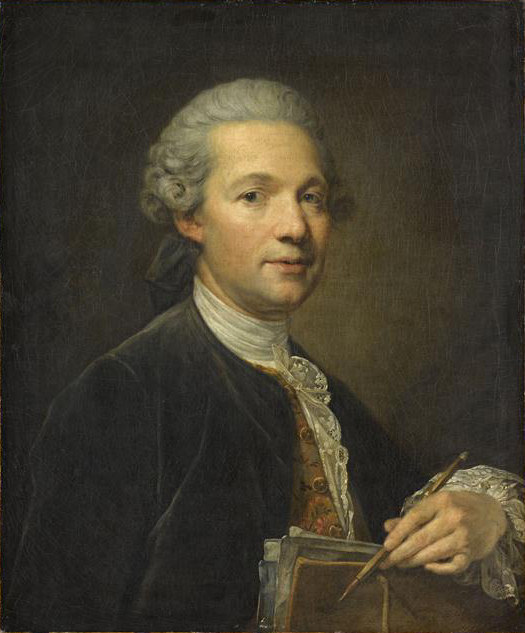
- Ange Jacques Gabriel by Jean-Baptiste Greuze
- Born: 23 October 1698; Paris, Kingdom of France
- Died: 4 January 1782 (aged 83); Paris, Kingdom of France
- Occupation: Architect
- Parent: Jacques Gabriel

Ange-Jacques Gabriel (French pronunciation: [ɑ̃ʒ ʒak ɡabʁijɛl]; 23 October 1698 – 4 January 1782) was the principal architect of King Louis XV. His major works included the Place de la Concorde, the École Militaire, and the Petit Trianon and opera theater at the Palace of Versailles. His style was a careful balance between French Baroque architecture and French neoclassicism.

== Biography ==
=== Early life and career ===
Ange-Jacques Gabriel was born on 23 October 1698, to a famous Parisian family of architects, and was connected by marriage with another celebrated architect of the time, François Mansart. His grandfather was an architect, and his father, Jacques Gabriel (1667-1742) received the title of Controller of the Buildings of the King at the age of twenty-one. His father's major projects included the Hôtel de Ville de Rennes and the Place Royale (now Place de la Bourse) in Bordeaux. The young Ange-Jacques became a member of the Académie royale d'architecture in 1728, and assisted his father on the Place de la Bourse. He became the principal assistant to his father as Premier Architecte at the Versailles from 1735 and, after his father's death, succeeded him as chief architect of the King.

In his new position, he served under the supervision of two successive Directors of the Buildings of the King, Charles François Paul Le Normant de Tournehem and Abel-François Poisson, Marquis de Marigny, the brother of the King's mistress and cultural advisor, Madame de Pompadour.

=== Place Louis XV (now Place de la Concorde) ===
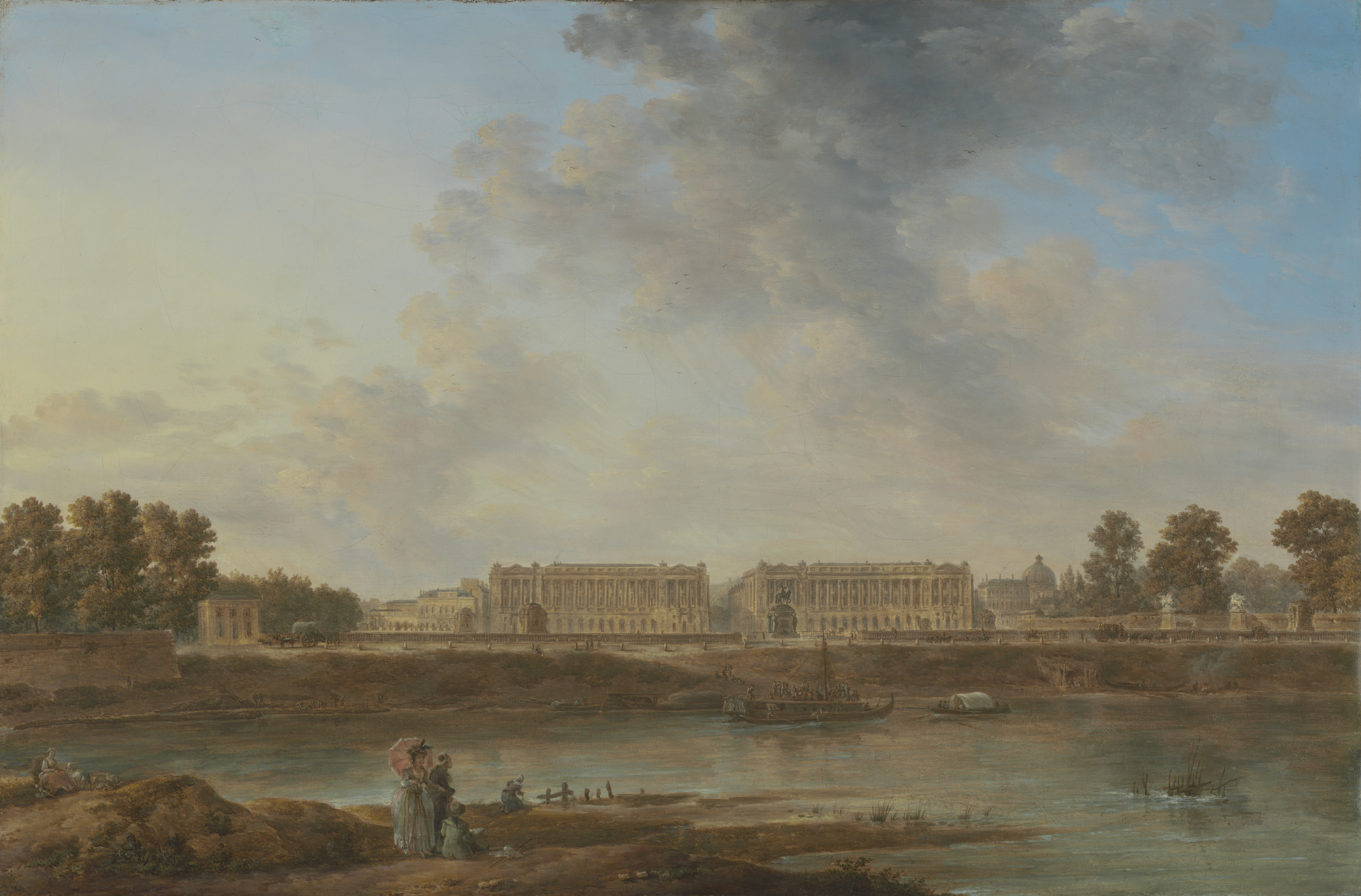
The Place Louis XV in about 1775

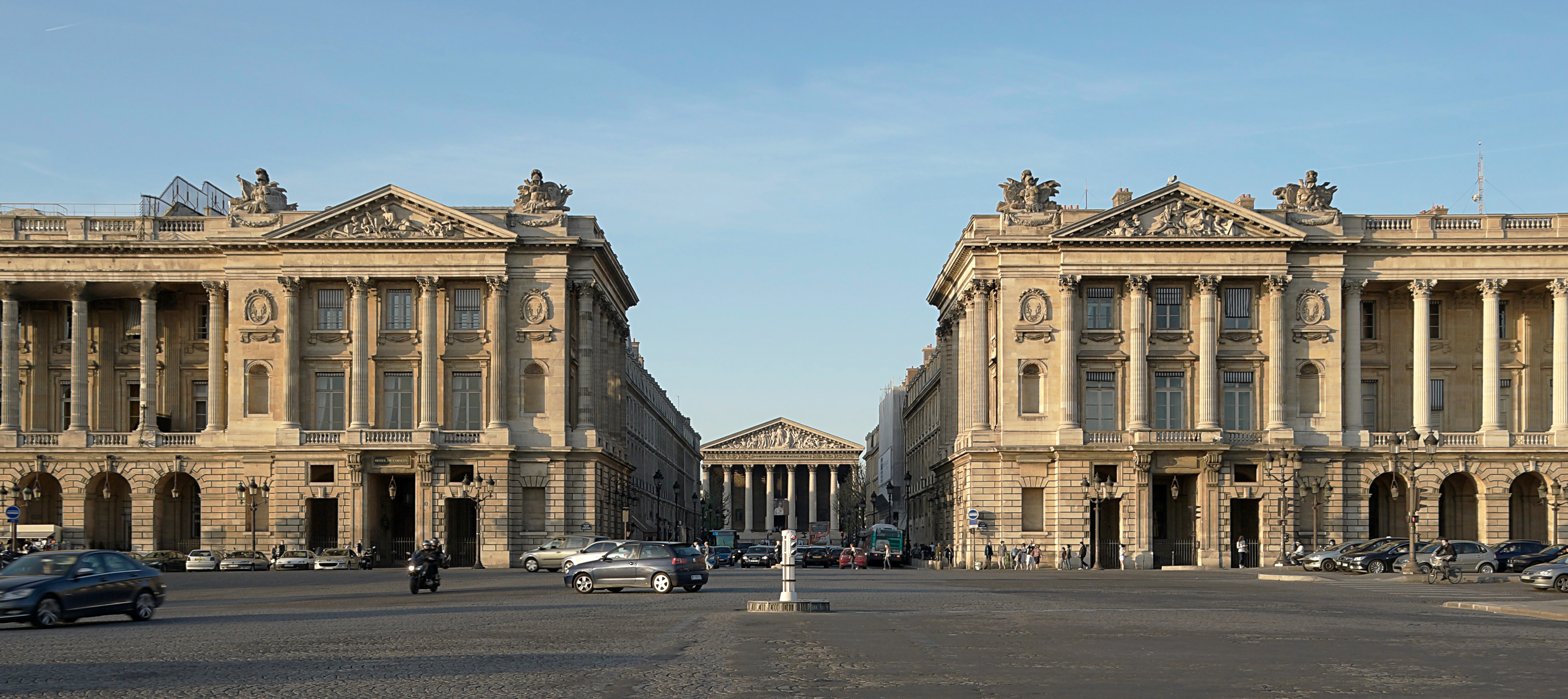
The Place de la Concorde

The Place Louis XV, today's Place de la Concorde was conceived in 1748 and completed in 1772, and was Gabriel's first major project. He was asked to find a compromise between several competing plans for the development of the marshy land between the gates of the Tuileries Garden and the new Champs-Élysées, on land donated by the King. Gabriel's design, combining elements of the earlier schemes, left the view toward the Seine open, and preserved unobstructed the long axis between the Tuileries and the Champs-Élysées. On the north side of the Place, he built two symmetrical palaces, leaving a gap between them, creating a new north–south axis, the Rue Rye Royale, connecting the Place to the Madeleine church, then under construction. The façades of the palaces, with rows of Corinthian columns, were modeled after the colonnades of the Louvre. The centerpiece of the square was an equestrian statue of Louis XV. The project was finalized in 1754 and was completed in 1763. The statue of Louis XV was removed during the French Revolution, and the obelisk, statues, and fountains were added in the 19th century.

=== École Militaire ===
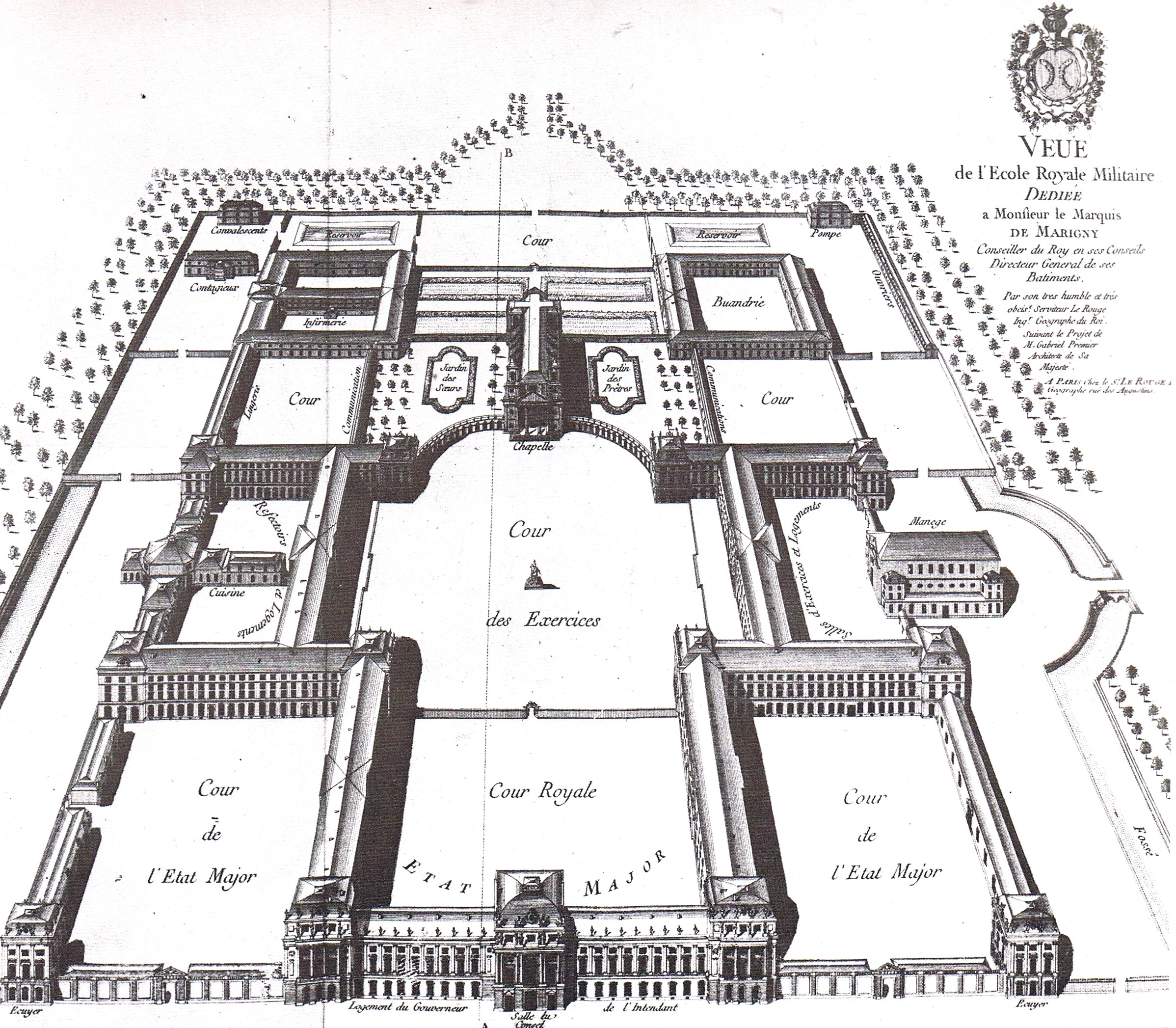
Gabriel's plan for the École Militaire

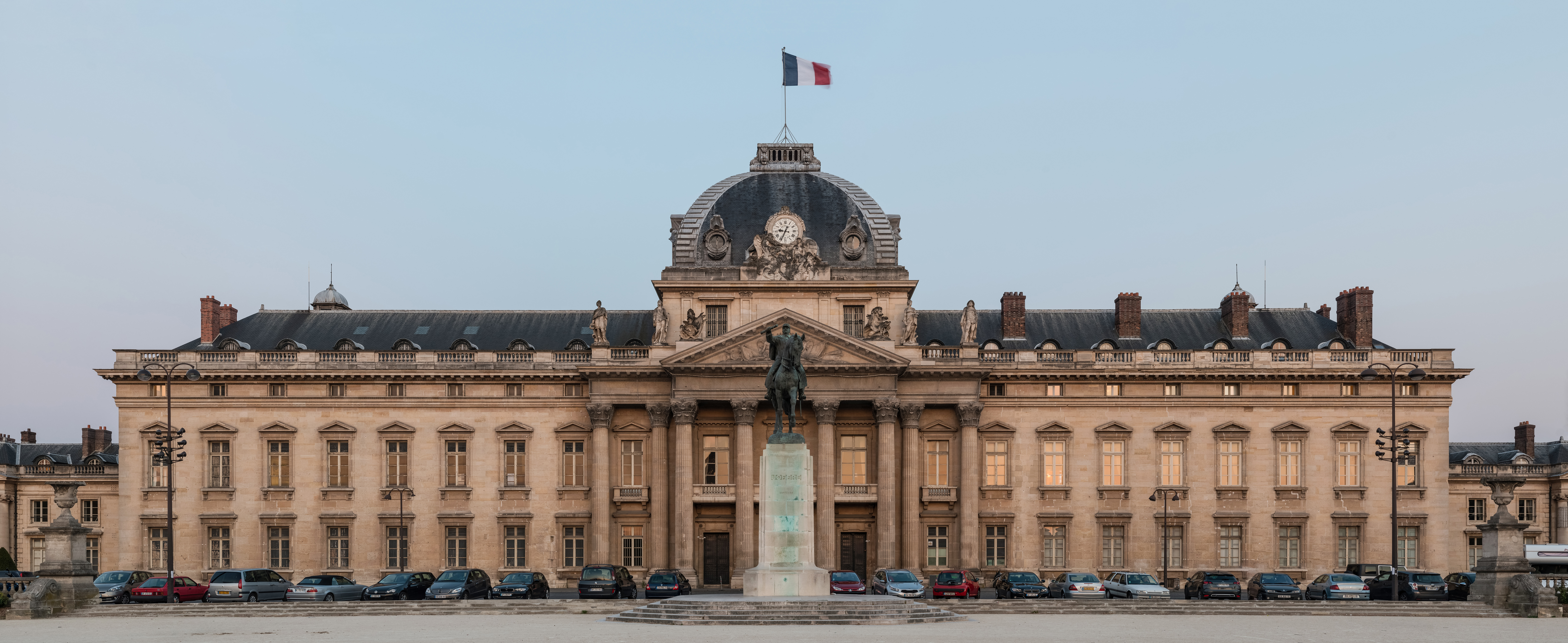
École Militaire

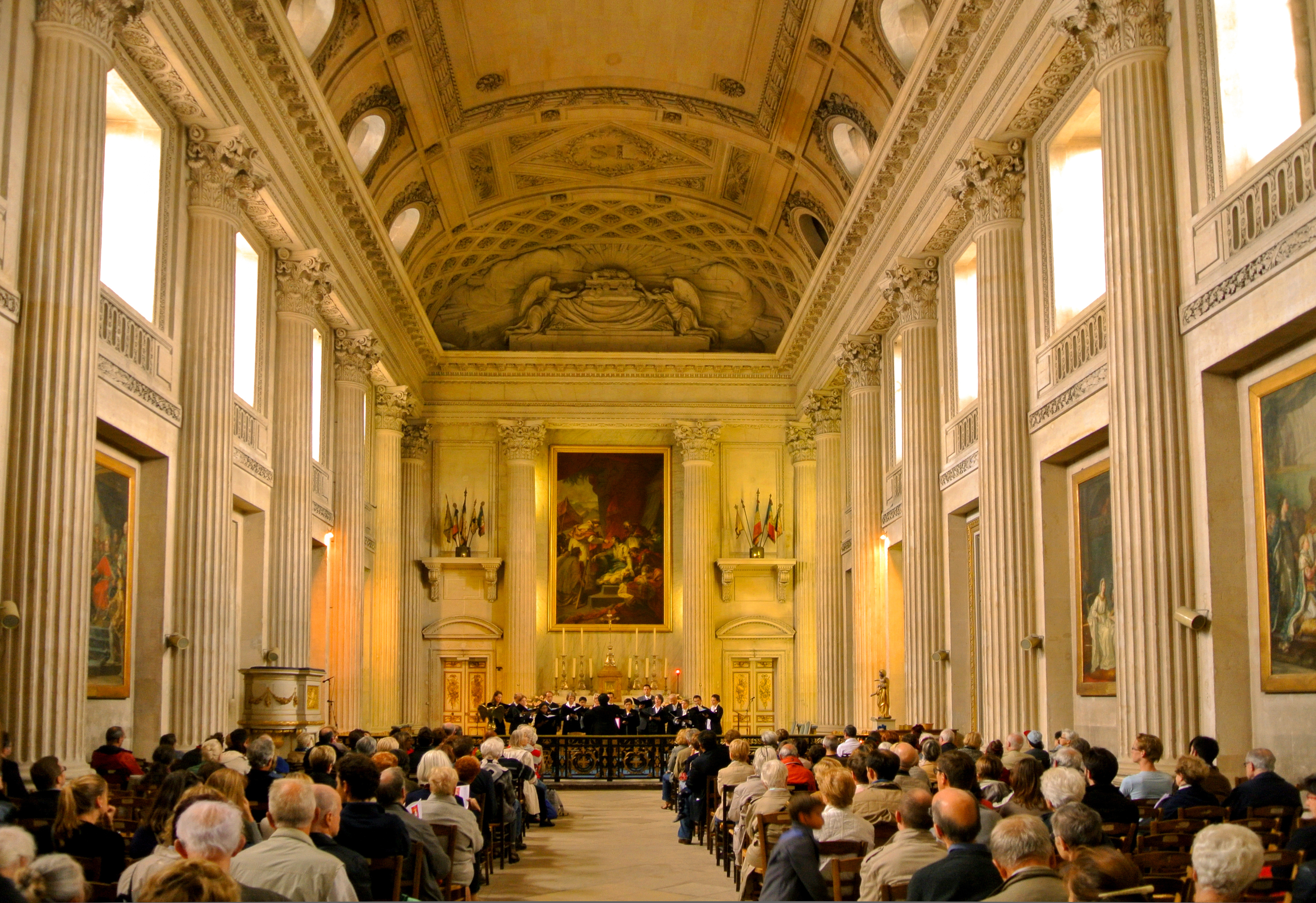
Chapel of Saint Louis

Louis XV decided in 1751 to create the École Militaire, the first French military academy, to train five hundred young men from poor noble families "gentlemen" in the art of warfare. The site chosen was next to the plain of Grenelle, on the left bank to the west of the city center. Gabriel's plan called for a "château" with two wings flanking a central pavilion with a dome, similar to that of the Louvre. The building featured a façade with a colonnade of the Doric order, and to the rear had a large courtyard with a façade of superimposed orders of columns, opening onto Place de Fontenoy. A chapel was artfully integrated into the architecture of the main building. The interior featured a lavishly decorated salon, now the Salle des Marechals, connected to the grand floor by a majestic ramp, and the Chapel of Louis IX, or Saint Louis, the patron saint of the Army. Two additional wings along Avenue de la Motte-Piquet were added in the 19th century.

=== Petit Trianon ===
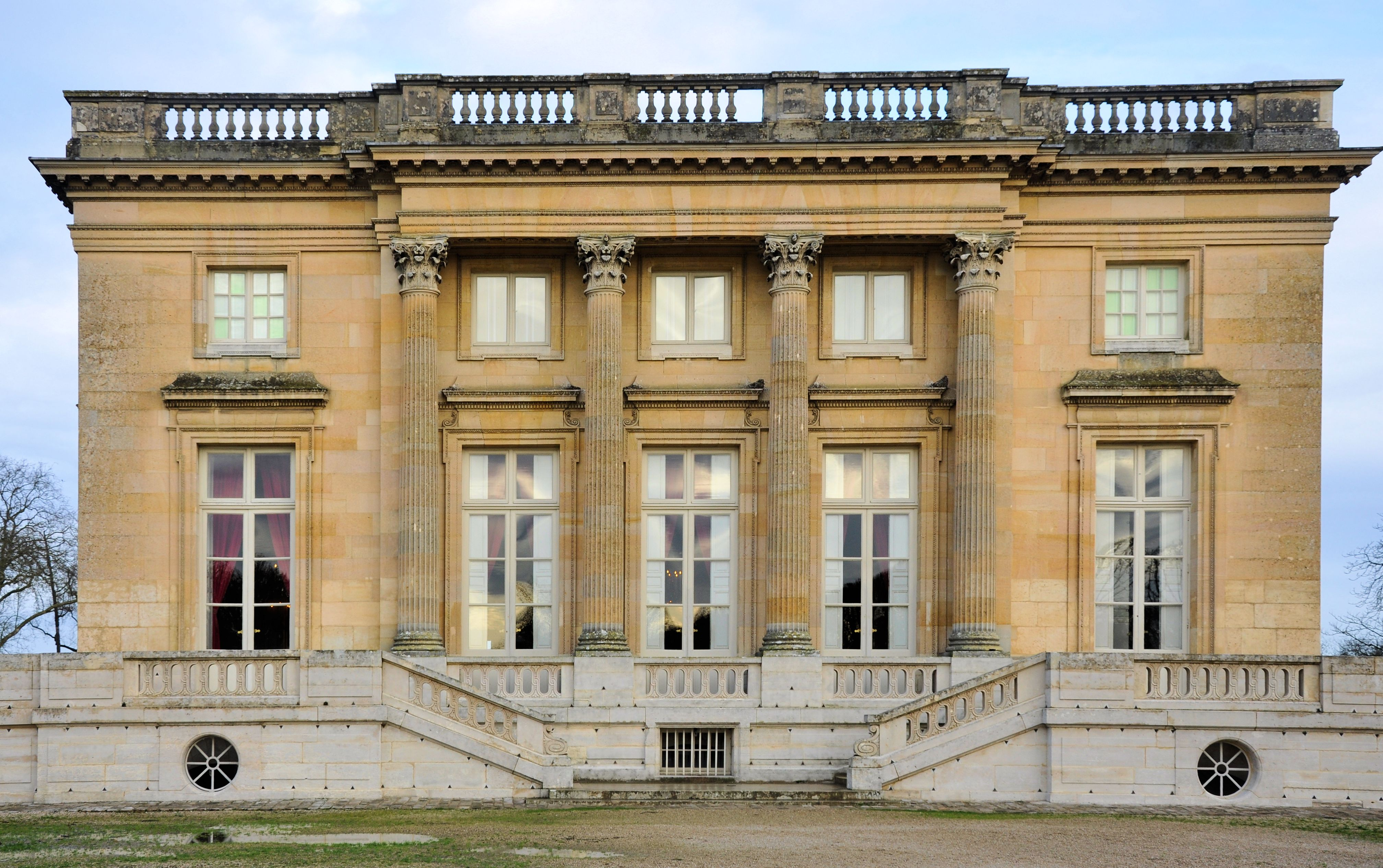
West façade of the Petit Trianon

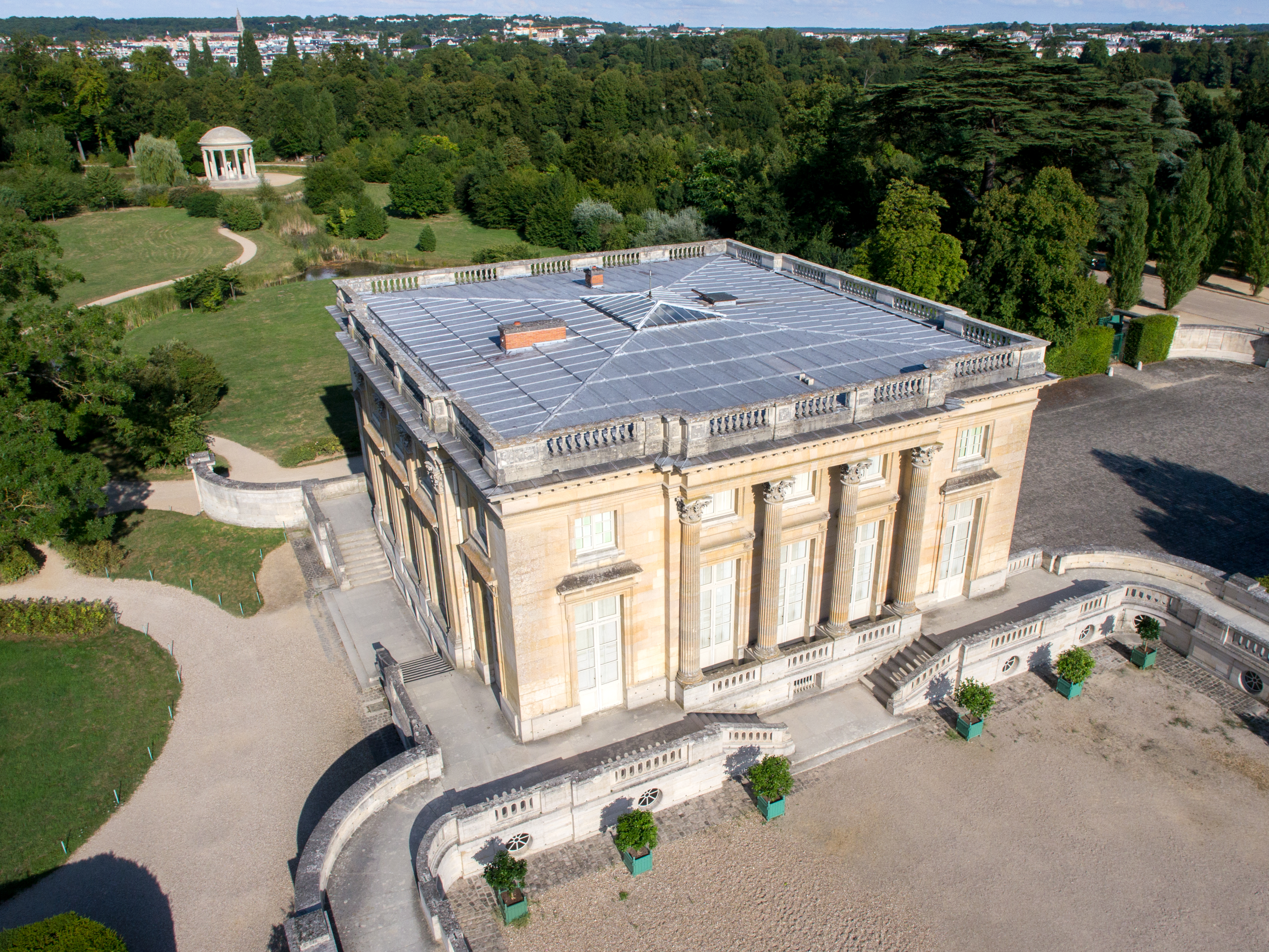
Aerial view of the Petit Trianon and its small park

At the request of Madame de Pompadour, Gabriel had made plans for a smaller pavilion at Versailles away from the main palace and the Grand Trianon. With the end of the expensive Seven Years' War Louis XV approved the plans, and between 1763 and 1768 the Petit Trianon was constructed. The building was cubic, and each façade was different; each was decorated with pilasters, columns and pediments in perfect proportion and harmony. The façades of the Petit Trianon represented in its most pure form the emerging style of Neoclassicism in France.

=== Royal Opera of Versailles ===
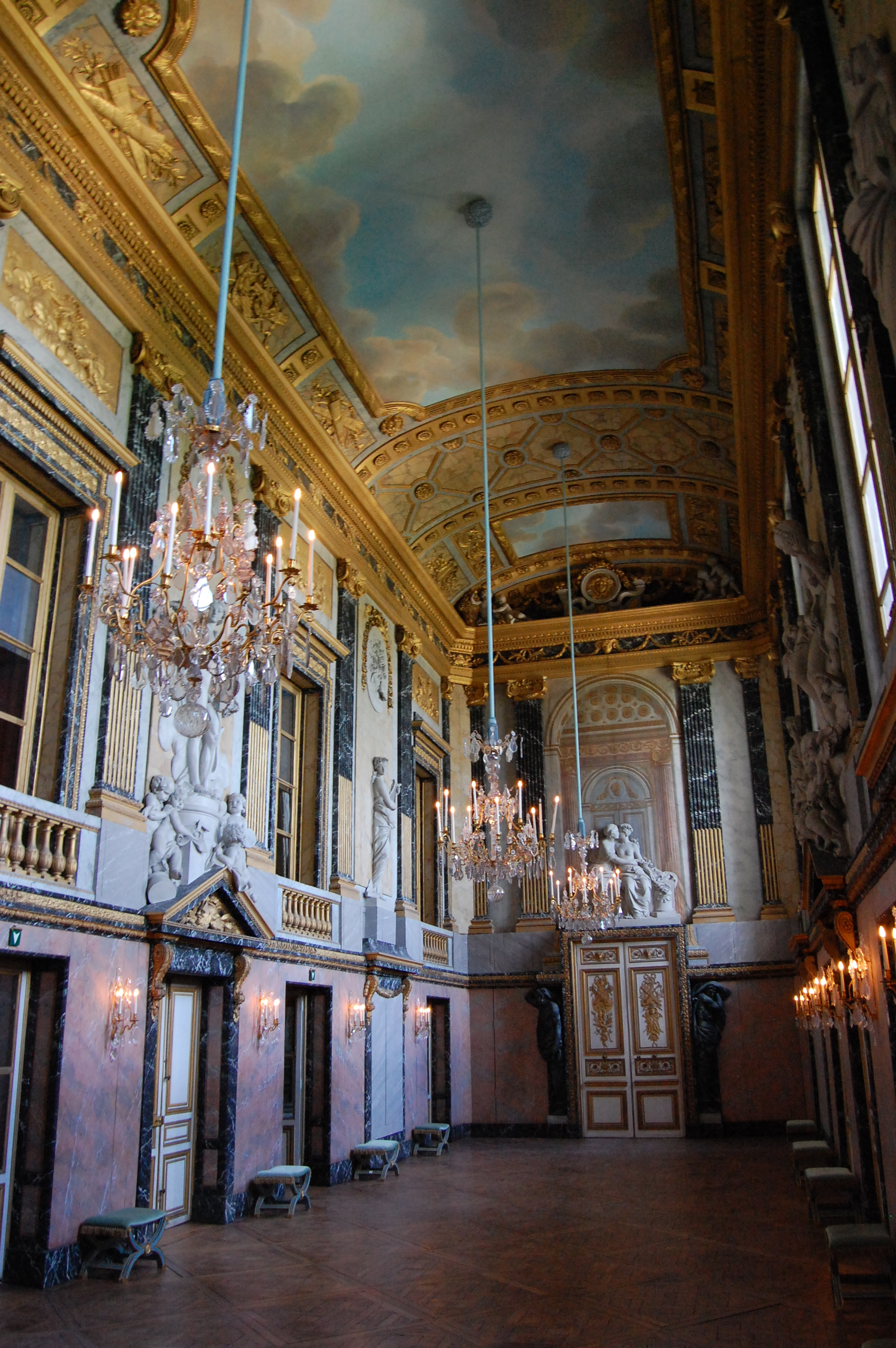
Foyer of the Royal Opera

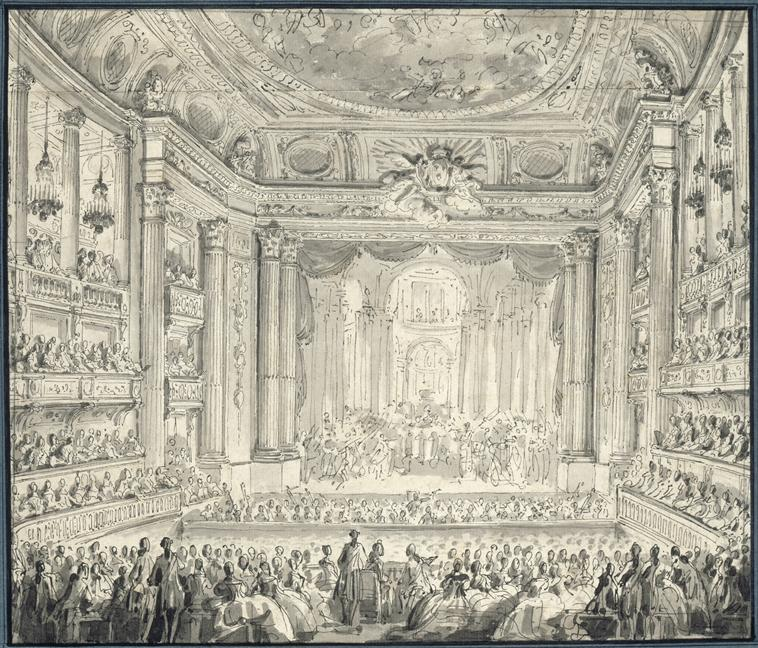
The Royal Opera during the celebration of the marriage of Louis XVI and Marie-Antoinette (1770)

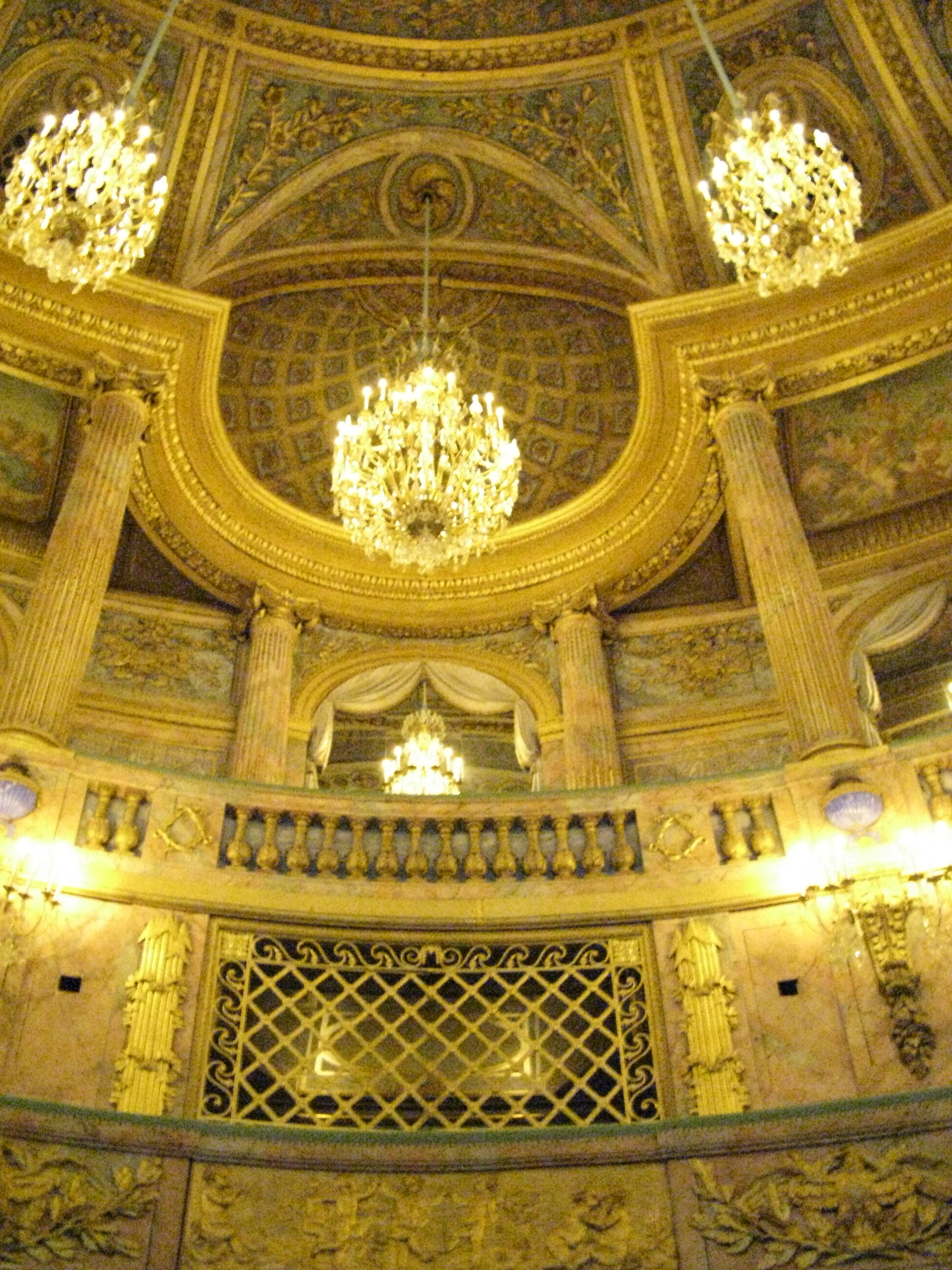
Royal box

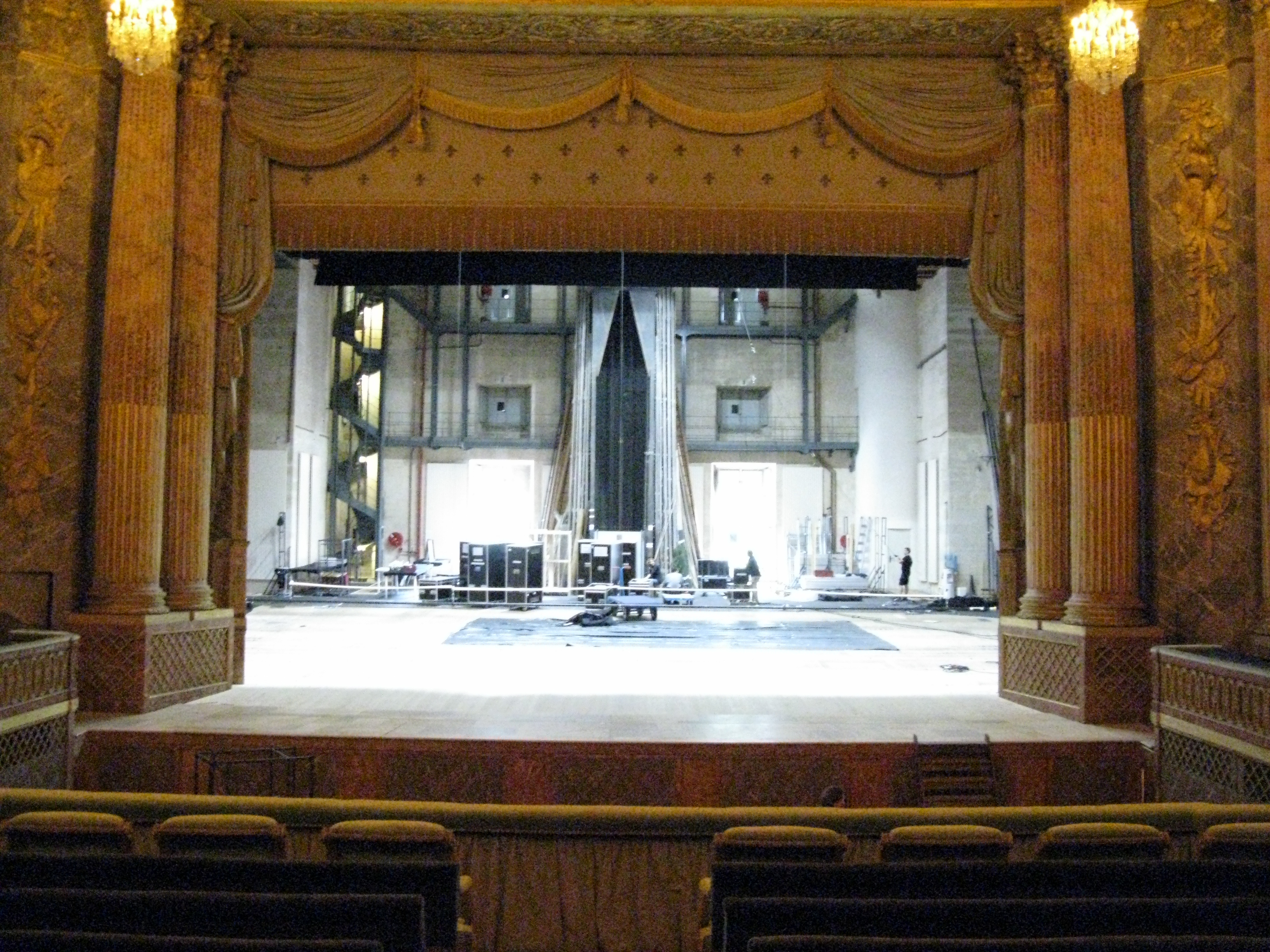
Stage of the Royal Opera

Much of his attention was devoted to modifications of the Palace of Versailles desired by Louis XV. The palace lacked a proper opera theater; a theater had been commanded under Louis XIV in 1682 for the end of the North Wing but the project had been put on hold due to its cost of the King's wars and the complexity of meeting the needs of the Court. Gabriel made a new proposal for the same site in 1748, but it was also put on hold due to the cost. Gabriel subsequently occupied himself with numerous modifications to the exterior of the palace, notably the completion and extension of the North Wing, following closely the original designs of Jules Hardouin-Mansart, completed in 1764.

The Opera project was revived in 1765 and was accelerated in 1770 for the celebrations of the marriage of the Dauphin, the future Louis XVI, to the Archduchess Marie Antoinette of Austria. To finish the project quickly and at lower cost, the theater was made entirely of wood, painted to resemble marble, but also giving it exceptionally good acoustics. The theater was in blue and gold, made in shape of truncated ellipse or oval, surrounded by tiers of boxes, decorated with carved and gilded wood, illuminated by three thousand candles whose light was reflected in mirrors. By this time Louis XV had a new mistress, Madame du Barry, and the royal box, the size of three ordinary boxes, had a grill to protect their privacy. Sculptures by Augustin Pajou and a painted ceiling by Louis Jean-Jacques Durameau completed the interior. Gabriel and his chief architectural engineer, Blaise Arnaud, studied installing a mechanism to hoist the floor of the theater up to the level of the stage, to create an enormous ballroom, but this was never completed.

=== Death ===
His final projects were the completion of the façades of the buildings he designed for the Place de la Concorde; the former Hôtel de Coislin, and the Hotel Crillon, finished in 1770. and the building of what today is the Hôtel de la Marine, the headquarters of the French Navy until 2016, which was finished in 1774. He died in Paris in 1782.

== Style ==
His sober rationality in planning and detail promoted the transition from Rococo to Neoclasscism. He was not especially known for boldness or originality; borrowing extensively from the French classicism and early classical models, particularly from the Louvre. He was known for his craftsmanship, his ability to balance the animation of the Baroque style with the more restrained neoclassicism, the proportions and balance and careful detail of his buildings, and his ability to create dramatic and harmonious ensembles of monumental buildings, as he did in the Place de la Concorde.

== Major works ==
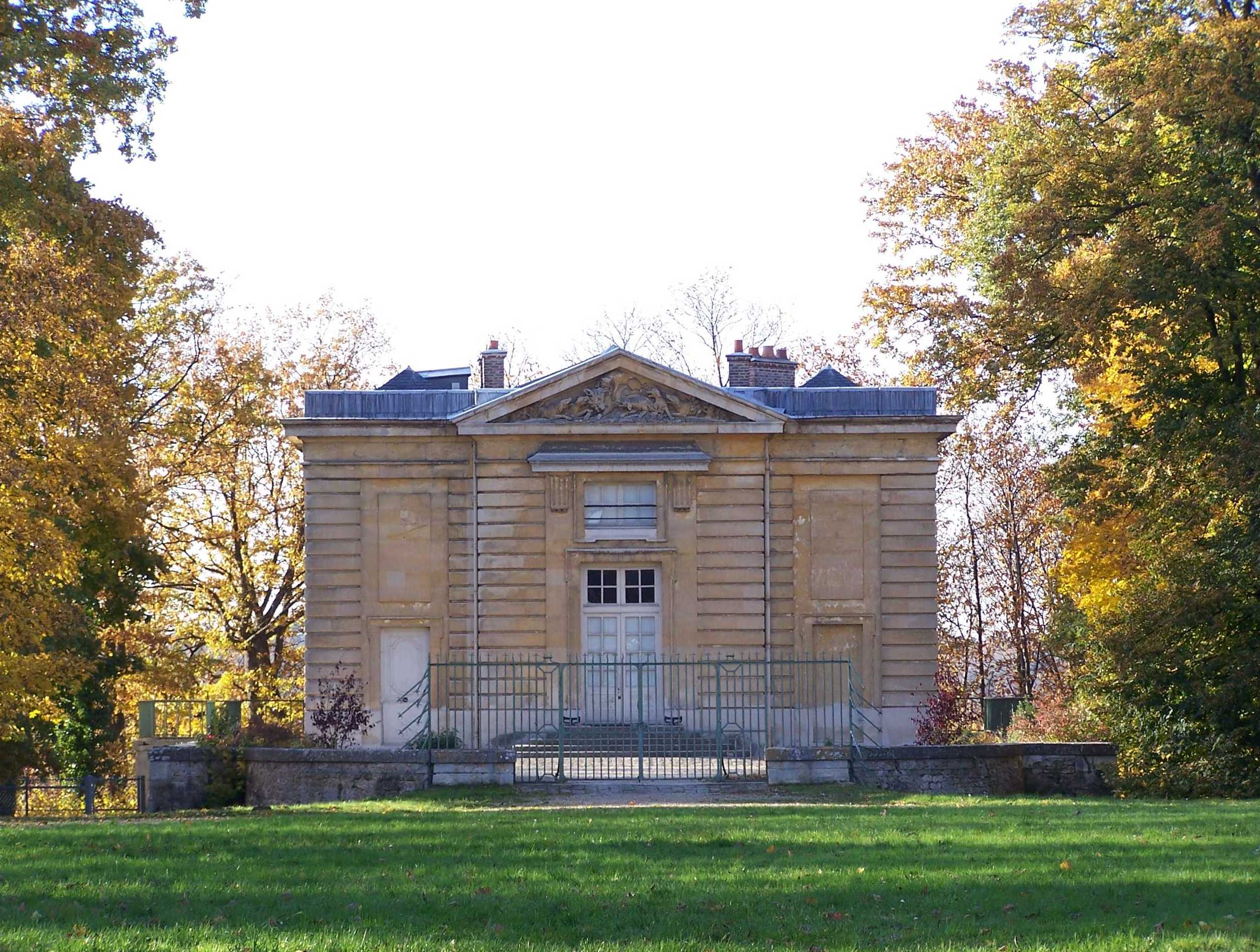
Pavillon Butard

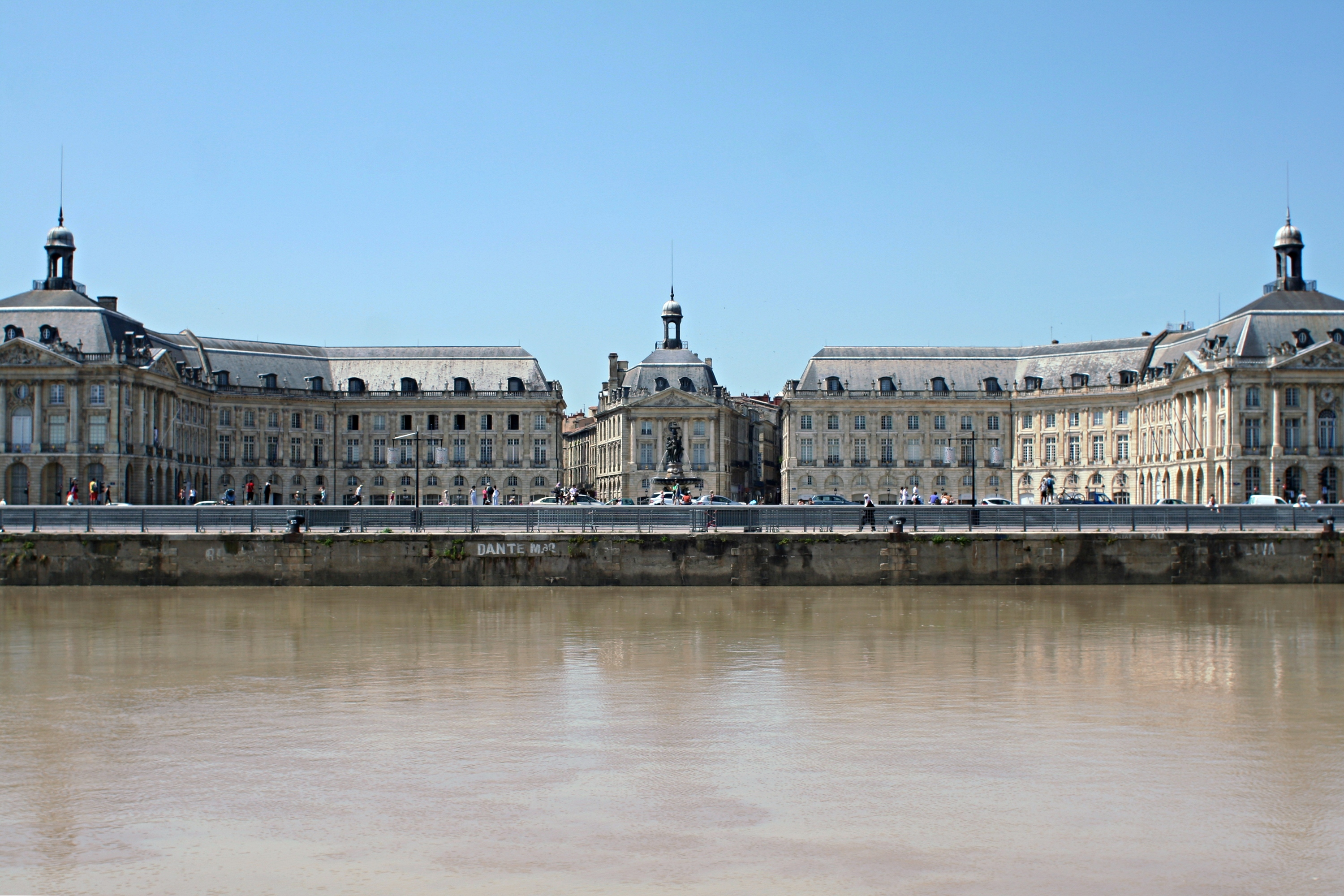
Place de la Bourse, Bordeaux

- Place de la Bourse, Bordeaux (as Place Royale), 1730–1775, begun by his father, after 1740 completed by Gabriel
- Extension and transformations at the Château de Choisy, 1740–1777
- Château de Compiègne, 1750 onwards
- Pavillon du Butard, 1750 at La Celle-Saint-Cloud.
- Extension of the Château de Menars (Loir-et-Cher), 1760–1764, for Madame de Pompadour
- French Pavilion of Versailles, beginning in 1750
- Petit Trianon, at Versailles, 1762 to 1768
- Pavillon de la Muette, Saint Germain-en-Laye, 1775
- École Militaire on the Champ de Mars, Paris
- Royal Opera at the Palace of Versailles, 1769–70
- Place de la Concorde (as Place Louis XV), 1772
- Hôtel de la Marine, Place de la Concorde, 1775
- Hôtel de Crillon, Place de la Concorde

== See also ==
- Neoclassicism in France
- Louis XV style

== Bibliography ==
- Braham, Allan (1980). The Architecture of the French Enlightenment. Berkeley: University of California Press. pp. 38–44. ISBN 9780520067394.
- Gallet, Michel (1999). "Anges Jacques Gabriel". Dictionnaire des Architectes. Paris: Encyclopaedia Universalis. pp. 256–264. ISBN 2-226-10952-8.
- Gallet, Michel; Bottineau, Yves (1982). Les Gabriel. Paris: Picard. ISBN 9782708400863..
- Gallet, Michel (1995). Les architectes parisiens du XVIIIe siècle: dictionnaire biographique et critique. Paris: Editions Mengès. pp. 212–224. ISBN 9782856203705.
- Kalnein, Wend von (1995). Architecture in France in the Eighteenth Century'. New Haven: Yale University Press. pp. 145–160. ISBN 9780300060133.
- Saule, Beatrix (2013). Versailles - The Chateau, the gardens, the Trianons. Paris: Art Lys. ISBN 9782711873395.
- Tadgell, Christopher (1978). Ange-Jacques Gabriel. London: A. Zwemmer. ISBN 9780302027813.
- Tadgell, Christopher (1982). "Gabriel, Ange Jacques". In Placzek, Adolf K. (ed.). Macmillan Encyclopedia of Architects. Vol. 2. London: The Free Press. pp. 133–144. ISBN 9780029250006.
- Tadgell, Christopher (1996). "Gabriel: (3) Ange-Jacques Gabriel". In Turner, Jane (ed.). The Dictionary of Art. Vol. 11. New York: Grove. pp. 882–884. ISBN 9781884446009.. Also at Oxford Art Online (subscription required).
