= French Pavilion of Versailles =

French Pavilion by the French Garden of the Petit Trianon of Versailles

Pavillon français
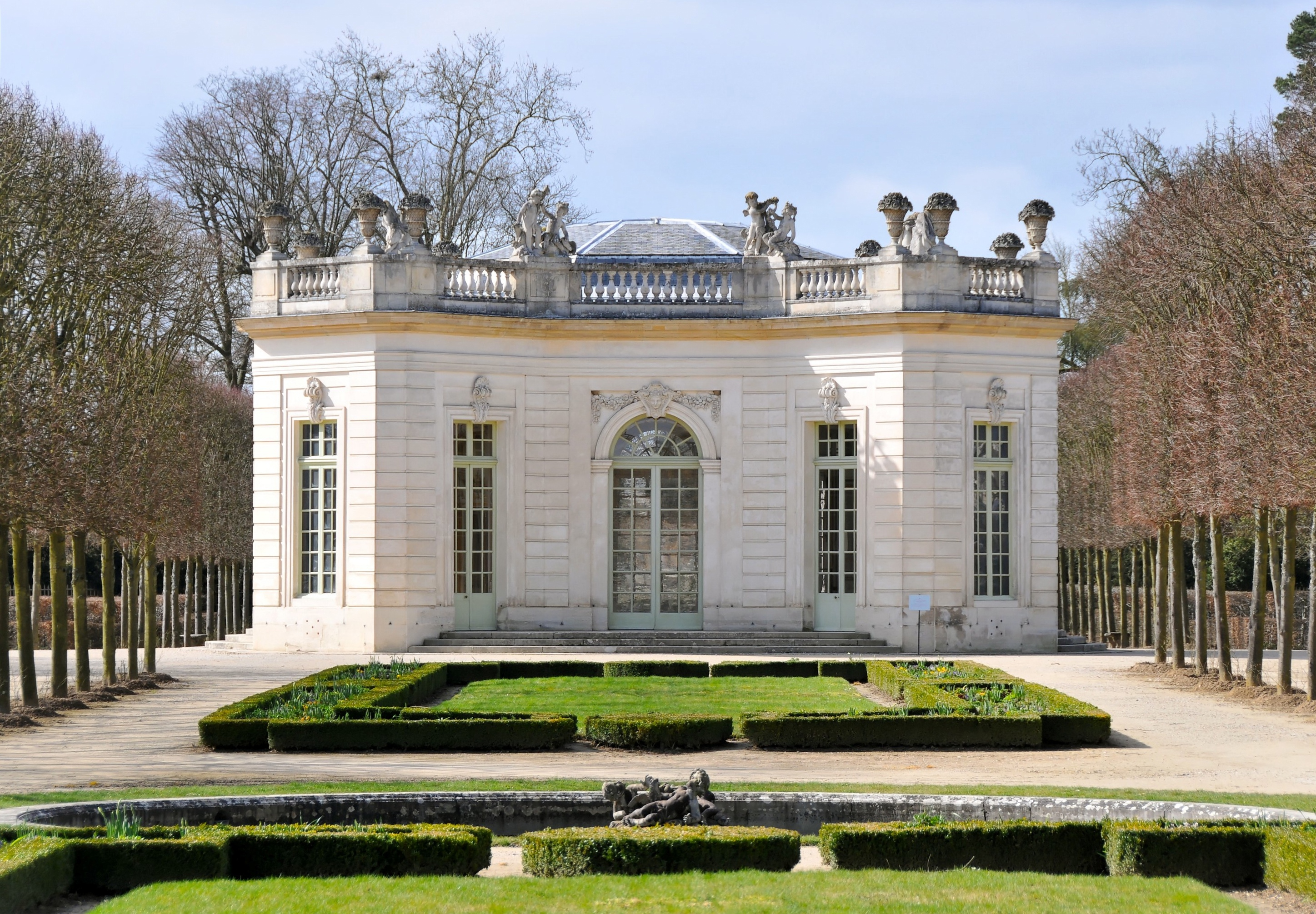
- East facade of the French Pavilion
- Interactive map of Pavillon français
- Location: Versailles
- Coordinates: 48°48′55″N 2°06′27″E
- Designer: Ange-Jacques Gabriel
- Beginning date: 1750
- Website: www.chateauversailles.fr/decouvrir-domaine/domaine-marie-antoinette-/les-jardins-et-le-hameau/les-jardins-a-la-francaise

The French Pavilion was built for Louis XV and Madame de Pompadour by Ange-Jacques Gabriel in the French Garden of the Petit Trianon, in the grounds of the Château de Versailles.Built in 1750, this pavilion is set in the heart of the formal garden, and its high French windows open onto its views. At once the centre and a natural extension of the "king's new garden", created to distract him from his melancholy, it serves as a music salon, a place for games and conversation. It is considered a masterpiece of balance between nobility and fantasy. Its original layout is based on an octagonal drawing room flanked by four small square cabinets arranged in a cross.

Jules-Antoine Rousseau's mascarons depicting the seasons adorn the cross-shaped windows on the stone facades. The balustrade is decorated with eight groups of children, allegories of the four seasons and the four elements, and eight vases of flowers by the same sculptor. The circular drawing room is decorated with carved panelling by Jacques Verbeckt, formerly covered in pastel colours to match the country atmosphere and now in gilding. Eight Corinthian columns support a cornice decorated with a variety of gallinaceous animals, a reference to the nearby domestic menagerie.

Turned into a café during the French Revolution, it once again became a party venue under the Empire, as it had been under the Ancien Régime, before slowly falling into disrepair. It underwent an initial restoration campaign at the end of the 19th century, which did little to restore it to its original state, before being completely restored in 2008. Classified with the Château de Versailles and its outbuildings as a historic monument by the list of 1862 and by decree of 31 October 1906.: it is open to the public as part of the Musée National des Châteaux de Versailles et de Trianon, within the Domaine de Marie-Antoinette.

== History ==
=== Construction ===
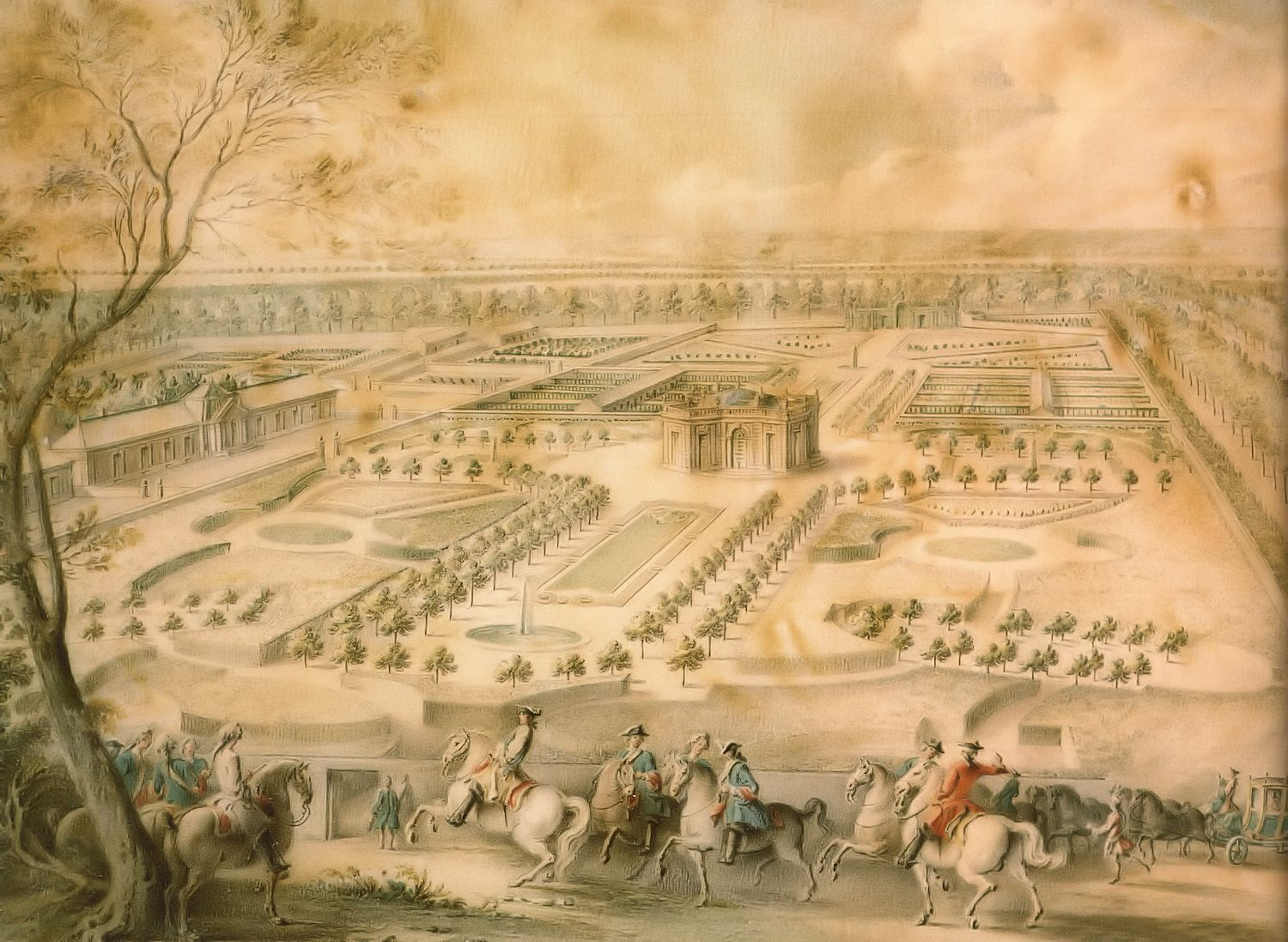
Louis XV's view of the Trianon gardens, the domestic menagerie and farmyards, the French Pavilion and the trellised portico Gouache attributed to Jacques-André Portail, circa 1750.

Gouache attributed to Jacques-André Portail, circa 1750.

At the end of 1744, King Louis XV returned to stay at Trianon Palace, which had been neglected for several decades, but which he still remembered fondly from his childhood. On 12 April 1747, Charles Lenormant de Tournehem, Director of the King's Buildings, and Ange-Jacques Gabriel, Chief Architect, visited the palace to launch a vast renovation project, the first studies of which were presented in December. The Marquise de Pompadour, who had been the King's mistress for two years, supported the project, with the aim of distracting Louis XV from his melancholy and sadness. As early as 1749, a new garden was laid out on land to the east of the château built by Jules Hardouin-Mansart. First of all, a menagerie was created, very different from that of Louis XIV, which was more exotic, as it was only intended to house domestic animals: chickens, cows and sheep. Its originality lies in the fact that it is little more than a farmyard and a dairy, but the dairy that is fitted out there gives it a character of "utility" and amusement. The king and his favourite appreciated the "beautiful hens" and enjoyed sampling the dairy products.

In front of this new menagerie, to the south, Gabriel designed a formal garden, planted with bosquets and adorned with basins, which Jean-Baptiste Belleville, the gardener of the marble Trianon, put into effect. The ambitions associated with this new garden soon required the recruitment of a florist-gardener, Claude Richard. Between the lawns and flower baskets were chicken coops and aviaries, and a trellised portico was erected on the eastern edge. (Note: It was on this site that the Petit Trianon château was built in 1762.) But the centrepiece of the perspective was a small pavilion that allowed visitors to immerse themselves in this new garden: the French Pavilion, then called the "Pavillon de la nouvelle ménagerie", was intended "for games, snacks or concerts". With the adjoining garden, the site was destined to become the "seat of a harmonious society, enlightened by the wise precepts of the physiocrats ".

Considered the Louis XV style paragon, the pavilion was lavishly adorned with projections, of which Gabriel was a master. After a variety of projects based on different architectural styles, the King opted for the most "baroque" form, in line with the models produced in Germany and Eastern Europe at the time. The carved stone building was designed in a more classical style, with lines of refinement strapping it together and its entablature crowned with a fence.

Begun in the spring of 1749, it was refurbished and roofed by August and ready to receive the vases of flowers and groups of sculpted children forming cushioning above the balustrade.

The particular design of the interior paving, presented by the architect on 29 May 1749, was executed using marble from Languedoc and the Pyrenees, as were the doorframes, the floors of certain cabinets and the fireplaces. After a few months' interruption during the winter, the work was completed in the spring of 1750 and the panelling and interior decorations were installed in the autumn.

=== Salon de divertissement ===
Although Louis XV was not a builder, he was passionate about architecture and plans. In 1754, he readily gave the French Pavilion as an example, telling Prince de Croÿ, who had come to ask his advice on the construction of the Château de l'Hermitage, that it was "in that style that it should be built".

This pavilion for games and conversation brought together the close friends and family of Louis XV and the Marquise de Pompadour, who also enjoyed the produce from the vegetable and fruit gardens and the dairy in the summer months. (Note: Gustave Desjardins, citing the writings of the Duc de Luynes, estimates that around twenty courtiers regularly accompanied the king and his mistress on "trips" to Trianon, not counting the gentlemen of the chamber, the captains of the guards and other high-ranking officers: Madame de Mirepoix, the Duchesse de Brancas, (Note: Louise Diane Françoise de Clermont-Gallerande, lady-in-waiting, widow of the Duke of Villars) the Marquise de Livry, (Note: Thérèse-Bonne Gillain de Bénouville, wife of François-Hyppolite Sanguin, Marquis de Livry) Madame de Marchais, (Note: Élisabeth Josèphe de Laborde, Binet de Boisgiroult de Sainte-Preuve family, Baroness de Marchais, future Countess d'Angiviller.) the Marquise d'Estrades, (Note: Élisabeth Charlotte Huguet de Sémonville.) the Comtesse de Pons, (Note: Marie Guyonne de Théobon Rochefort) the Marquise de Sassenage, (Note: Marie Françoise Casimire Bérenger.) the Comtesse du Roure, (Note: Marie Antoinette Victoire de Gontaut-Biron.) all ladies in the usual society of the Marquise de Pompadour or actresses in the Petits Cabinets theatre; among the men were the Prince de Soubise, the Duc de Luxembourg, the Duc d'Ayen, the Marquis de Montferrand, (Note: Charles-Antoine de Gontaut, lieutenant general of the king's armies) the Marquis de Poyanne, (Note: Léonard de Baylens, marshal of camp) the Baron de Montmorency, the Marquis de Meuse, (Note: Henri Louis de Choiseul-Meuse.) the Duc de Chevreuse, the Duc de Chaulnes, etc. Louise Diane Françoise de Clermont-Gallerande, lady-in-waiting, widow of the Duc de Brancas.)

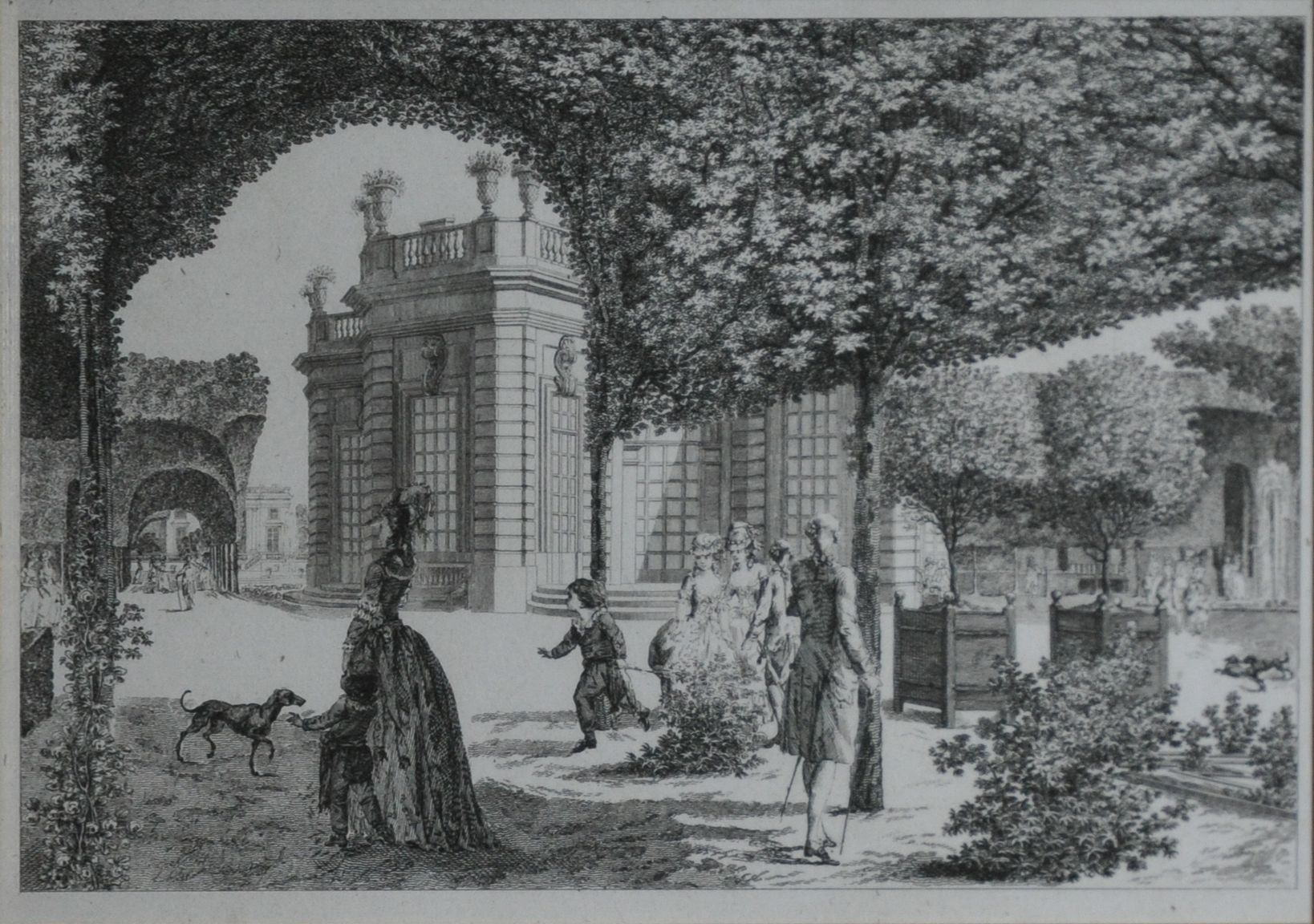
Marie-Antoinette strolling through the Jardin français, near the Pavillon français and the Petit Théâtre, in the company of Madame Royale, the Duc de Normandie and the Dauphin.

Marie-Antoinette, who took possession of the Petit Trianon estate in 1774, made no changes to the pavilion, the only substantial addition to the French garden being the construction of a small theatre. Conquered by the charm of this delicate edifice, she even gave parties there: in July 1781, canvas tents were added to the pavilion for lantern-lit concerts to mark the visit of her brother, Emperor Joseph II. When the royal family was at Trianon, the salon was used for card games, music and conversation, as in any aristocratic residence in the eighteenth century; it was the ideal place for suppers on warm summer evenings. The queen also held balls there, adding a demountable marquee. (Note: Gustave Desjardins shows a "Design for a tent-like ballroom to be placed in front of the Pavilion in the middle of the French Garden of the Petit Trianon".)

During the French Revolution, the French Pavilion, like the entire Petit Trianon estate, was abandoned, then stripped of its furnishings at the auction sales that began in August 1793. Under the Directoire, it was converted into a café for the occupants of the Château du Petit Trianon, which had been transformed into a hotel, and the French garden was the venue for popular balls, with occasional illuminations and fireworksice.

As the Petit Trianon regained its status as a palace at Napoleon's instigation, the pavilion was restored in 1806, although the changes did not last: the Corinthian columns were restored and new capitals with winged women or scrolls were created in papier-mâché; an eagle was painted on the dome, soaring towards the Empyrean; the panelling was covered in grey and blue tones and the fireplaces were removed. In 1810, a circus was set up nearby to stage a performance by the Franconi brothers. At the height of imperial life at Trianon the following year, Marie-Louise used the French Pavilion as part of the "Empress's Festival"; for the occasion, as in the previous century, two large blue and white striped coutil tents with a fringe of red wool were erecte. The French Pavilion was also used for the "Empress's Festival".

=== 20th and 21st centuries ===
The building was restored for the first time in the nineteenth century, but the latest campaign, carried out in 2008 by Pierre-André Lablaude, chief architect of historic monuments thanks to sponsorship from Breguet watches, restored the pavilion to its original state. All the decorations, which had deteriorated considerably over time, were restored: the panelling, sculptures and ornaments, ceilings, marble floors and parquet flooring. The two marble fireplaces and the warming hood were restored. The interior shutters were recreated.

Given the difficulty of restoring the eighteenth-century decor in the delicate tones on a water-green background, which were known in principle but whose distribution remained unknown, the decision was taken to retain the gilding, albeit dissonant, added in the following century.

Lastly, the organisation of the small wings has been restored to its original configuration: under Louis XV, two of them, reserved for service, were completely separated from the central salon and could only be accessed from the outside. The 2008 works therefore reinstate these old partitions.

The Pavillon français has also been used for film and television shoots, including (Note: The dates given are those of the shoot.)

- 1927: La Valse de l'adieu, a film directed by Henry Roussel
- 2005: Marie-Antoinette, directed by Sofia Coppola
- 2011: Le Chevalier de Saint-Georges, a docu-drama directed by Claude Ribbe.

The Pavillon français also hosts shows and performances, such as the oratorical joust between actors Fabrice Conan and Georges Caudron in September 2012, on "La femme au temps de la Pompadour ".

== Description ==
=== French garden ===
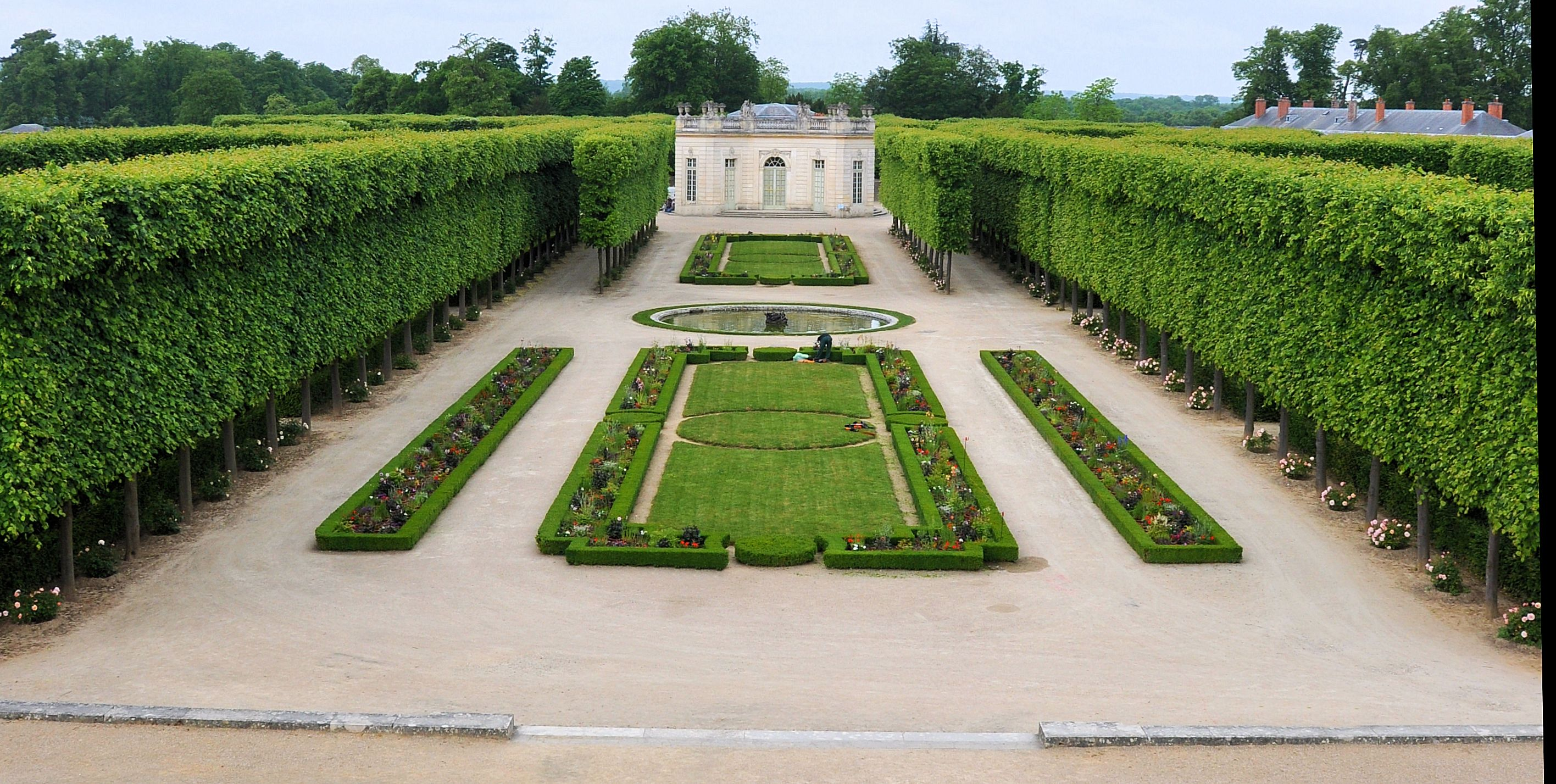
View of the French Garden and the French Pavilion from the Château du Petit Trianon.

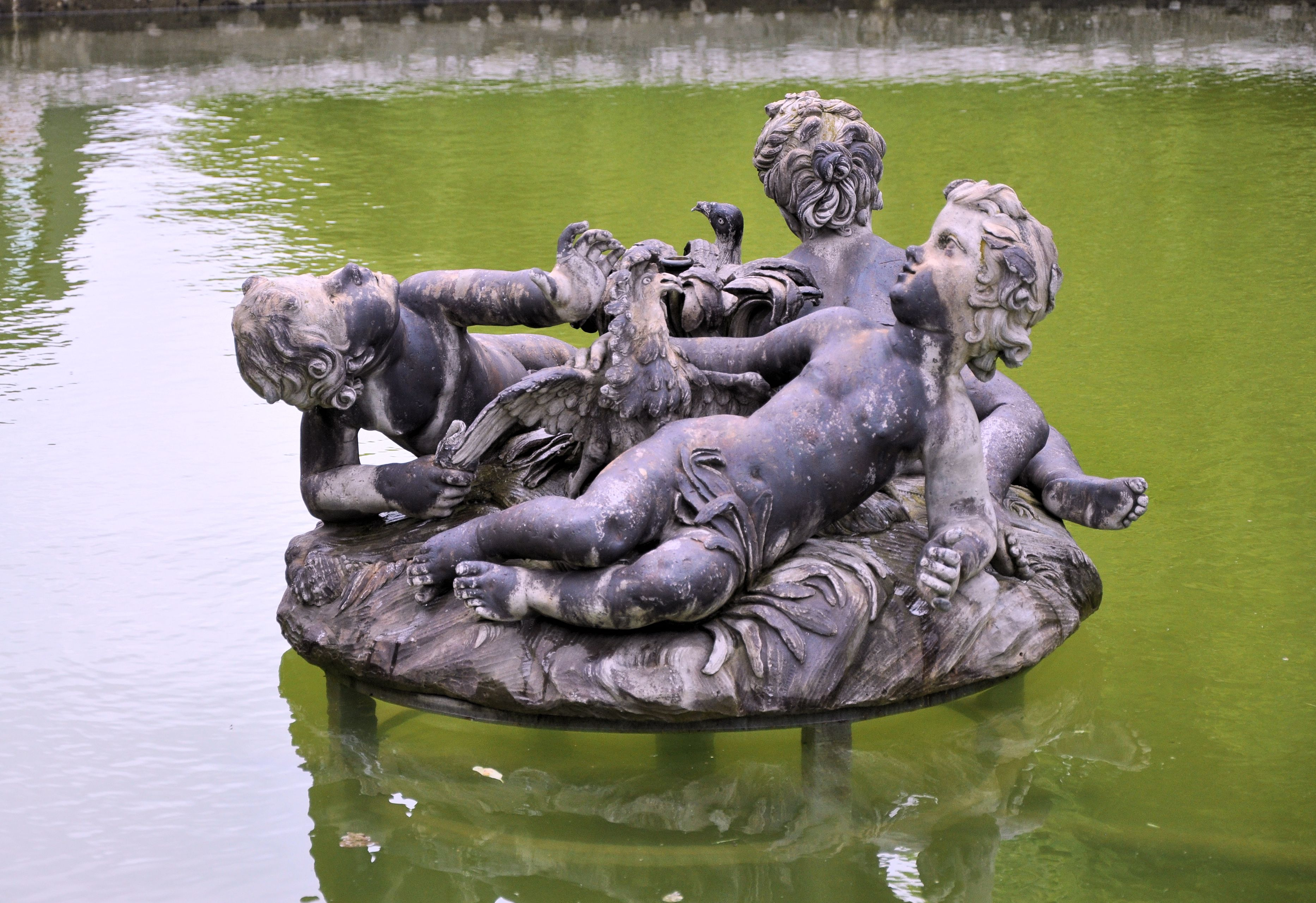
Group of children in a pond in the Jardin français.

The French garden, of which the pavilion is the centerpiece, was created in 1749 by the architect Ange-Jacques Gabriel. It comprises a long lawn with flower borders, the regularity broken by two of the four basins. These marble-edged pools, circular or square in shape, are arranged opposite each facade of the pavilion and are embellished with lead statues representing groups of three children playing with fish and waterfowl, sculpted by Jules-Antoine Rousseau. The long parallel avenues lined with poplars also delineate the green rooms set in bower beds, providing easy access to the chapel or the theatre.

Heading east towards the Grand Trianon, you take the "Evergreen Alley", planted with evergreen trees, before arriving at the "Reunion Bridge", so named as the only realisation of Napoleon's project to unite the two Trianons, between which there was previously no communication. This small bridge, originally made of wood but rebuilt in metal in 1889, spans a sunken pathway replacing the old planted driveway that separated the two estates.

=== Exterior ===
Plan of the French Pavilion based on old prints and drawings by Claude-Louis Châtelet, updated after the latest restorations.

The pavilion is called "French" because of its location in the centre of the formal garden. It is a model of Rococo architecture. Its plan is centred, in the shape of a St Andrew's cross. In fact, this motif is rendered by the outline of an octagon flanked by four rectangular hors d'oeuvre cabinets, all set within a circular representation marked by the external steps. This perfect, centred plan follows in the footsteps of contemporary architects, while retaining only the essentials, giving the building a character that is more brilliant than grandiose.

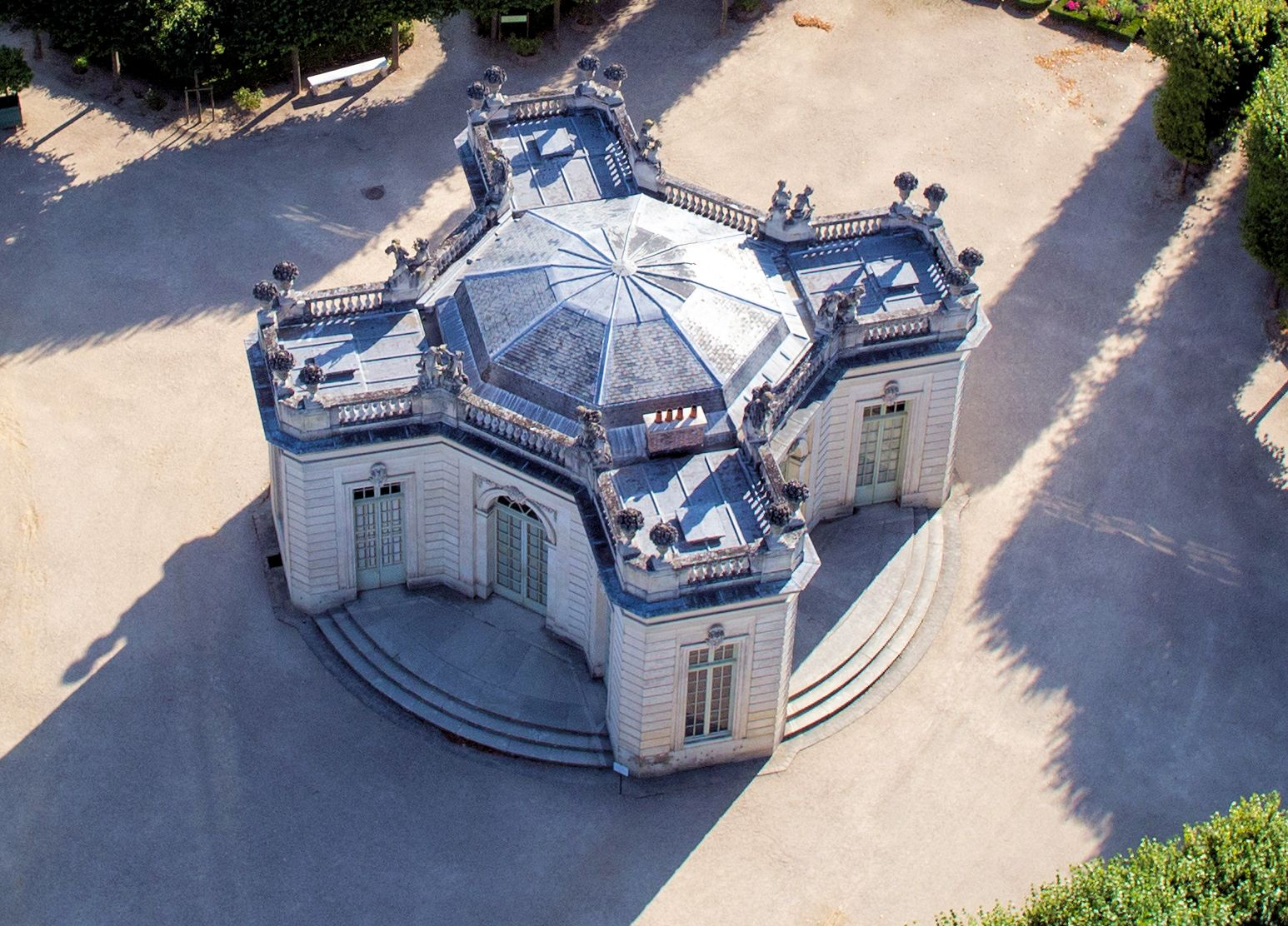
Aerial view of the French Pavilion at sunset.

The combination of the Masse floor plan (Note: The "massed plan" is a compact, unstretched plan that can accommodate juxtaposed pavilions.) and the flat roofs covering the adjoining offices alone, as well as the Pavillon frais nearby, (Note: Although the principle of the flat roof hidden behind balustrades originated in Italy, as d'Aviler points out, Hardouin-Mansart had already incorporated it at Trianon-sous-Bois and Marly.) places Gabriel in line with his more modern colleagues such as Ledoux and Boullée. In contrast to the star-shaped cabinets, with their Italian-style roof terraces, the central octagonal salon, with its four arched French windows, has a domed roof. Each of the cabinets is illuminated by three large windows with rectilinear lintels. Above each of these twelve windows is a bracket one metre high and sixty centimetres wide decorated with a plant symbolising a season. The four other French windows opening onto the living room are surmounted by Méry stone masks of divinities, also representing the seasons.

On the balustrade, statuettes of children alternate with vases of flowers, originally the work of Jules-Antoine Rousseau, sculptor to the king's buildings. These eight groups are arranged in line with each of the re-entrant corners of the façade; they represent the four seasons and the four elements, measure approximately 1.50 metres and are carved in the round from Saint-Leu stone. Executed in 1749-1750 at a cost of 38,301 livres, the sixteen statuettes of children were placed in storage after the French Revolution. The eleven least damaged were restored in 1893, but the other five were reproduced by the sculptor Alphonse Guilloux. Considered to be of poor quality, these copies were withdrawn and, between 1960 and 1964, all eight groups were completely redone by Georges Chauvel and Eugène Joachim.

When these statuettes were installed in 1967, it was decided to restore the sixteen missing flower baskets. As no model had been preserved, sculptor Pascal Soullard drew inspiration from the drawings in the "Modena album". The flowers in the vases, originally made of lead, are now made of stone.

Groups of children on the balustrade, allegories of the seasons and the elements

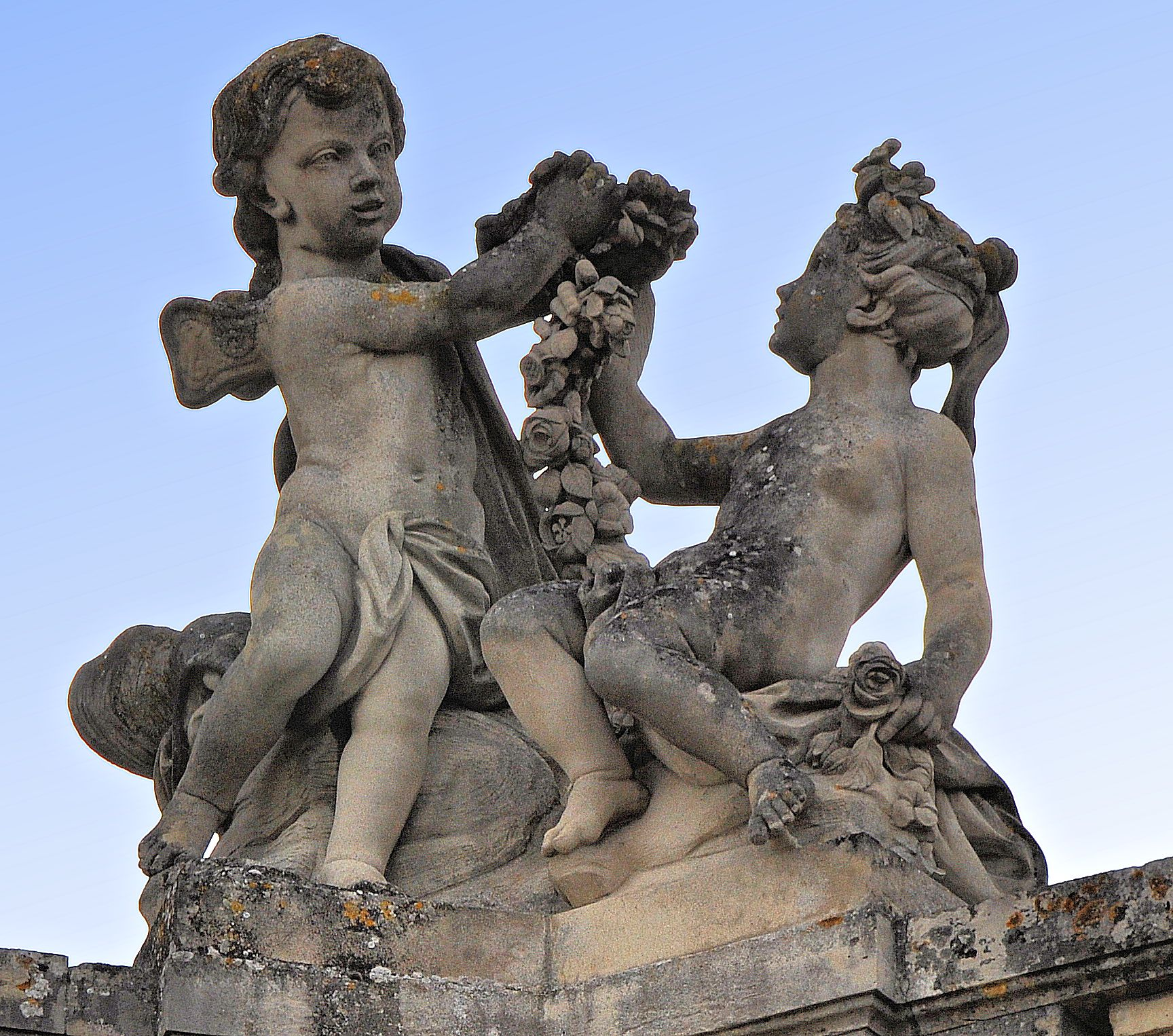
Towards the castle: children with flowers. Springtime.

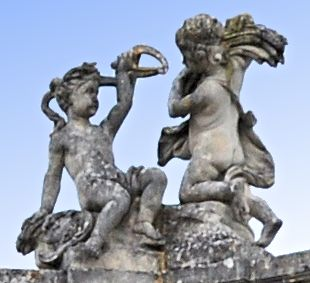
Towards the Fresh Pavilion: harvesting children. Summertime.

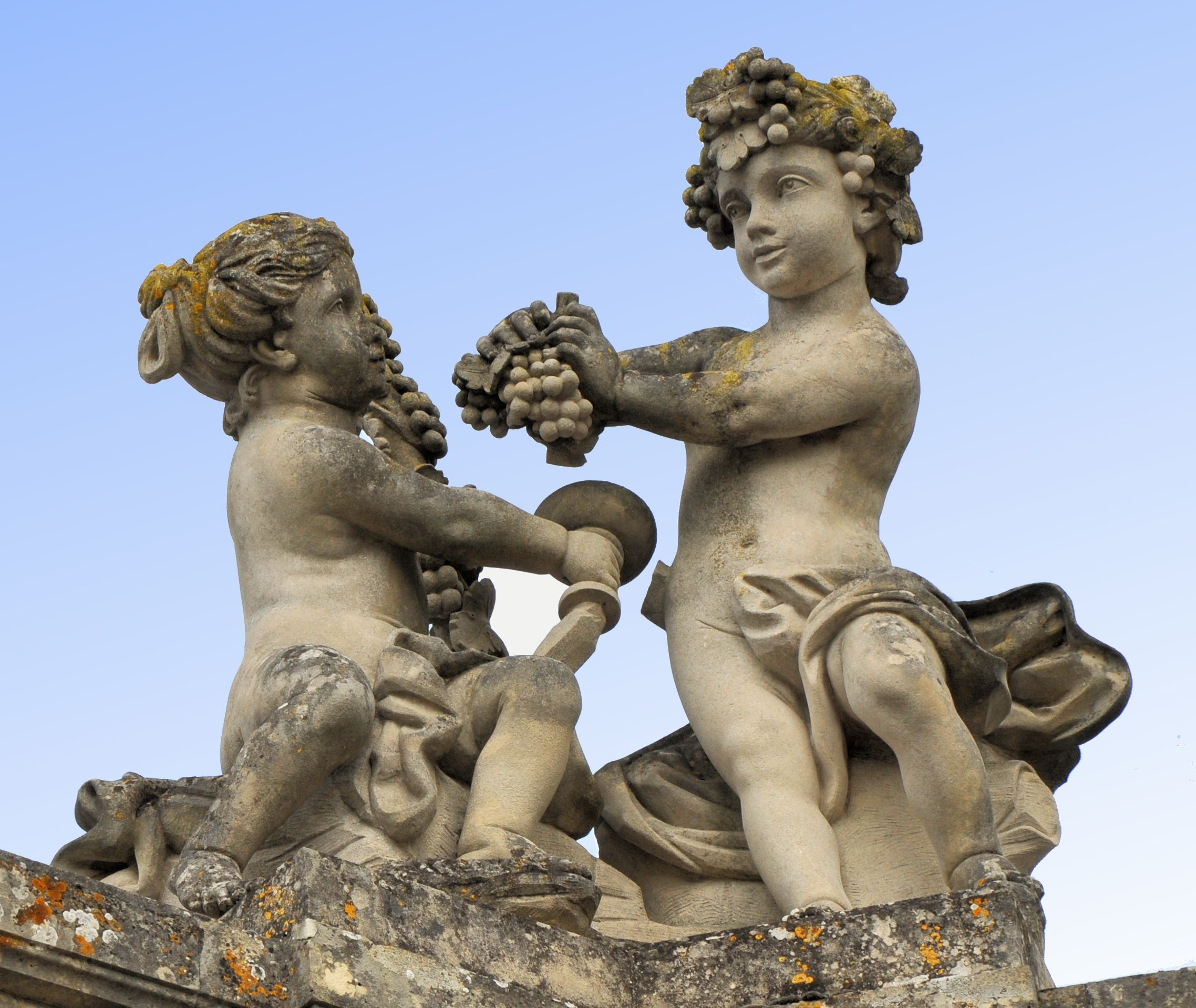
Towards the Grand Trianon: children picking grapes. The autumn.

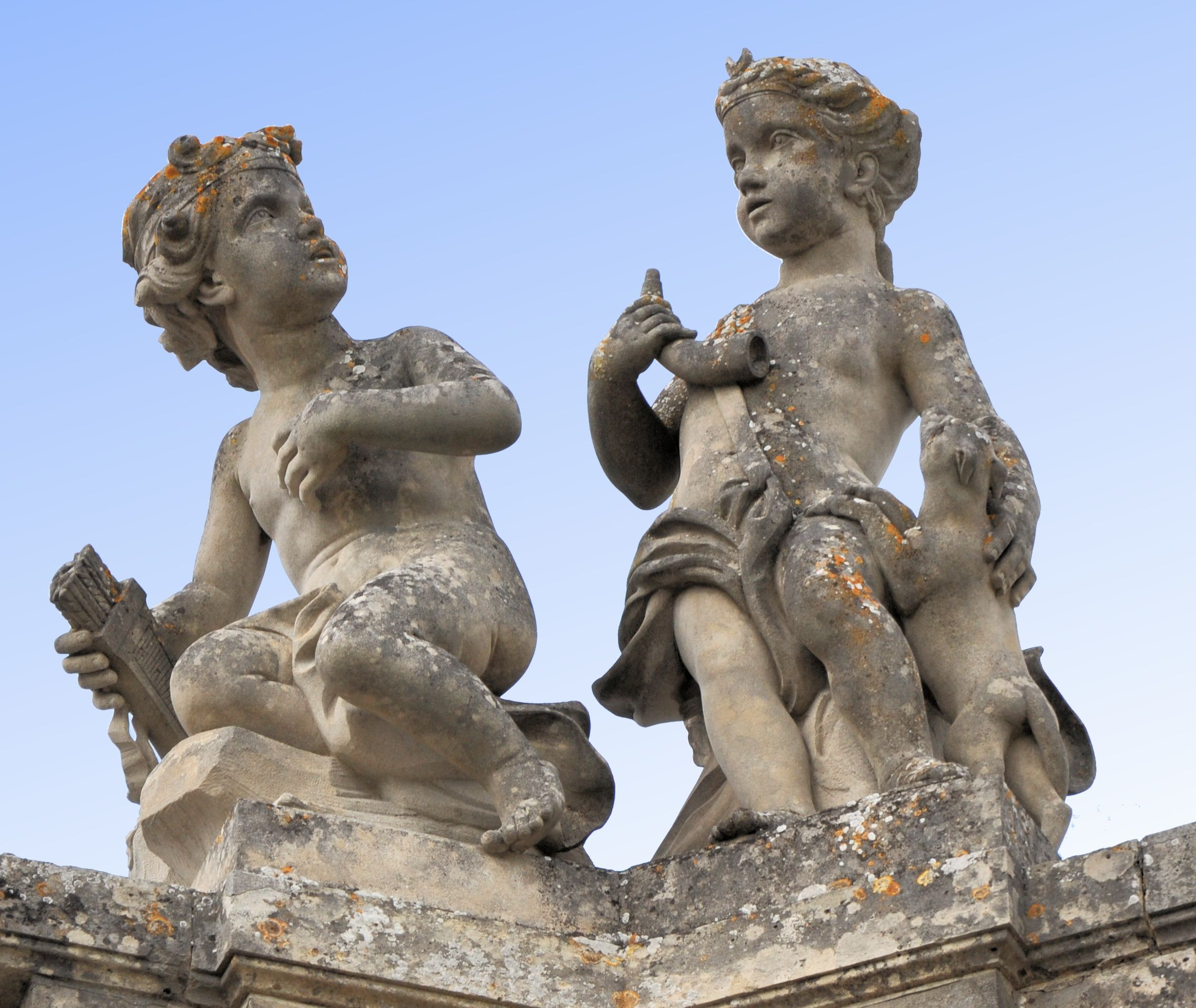
To the menagerie: child hunters. The winter.

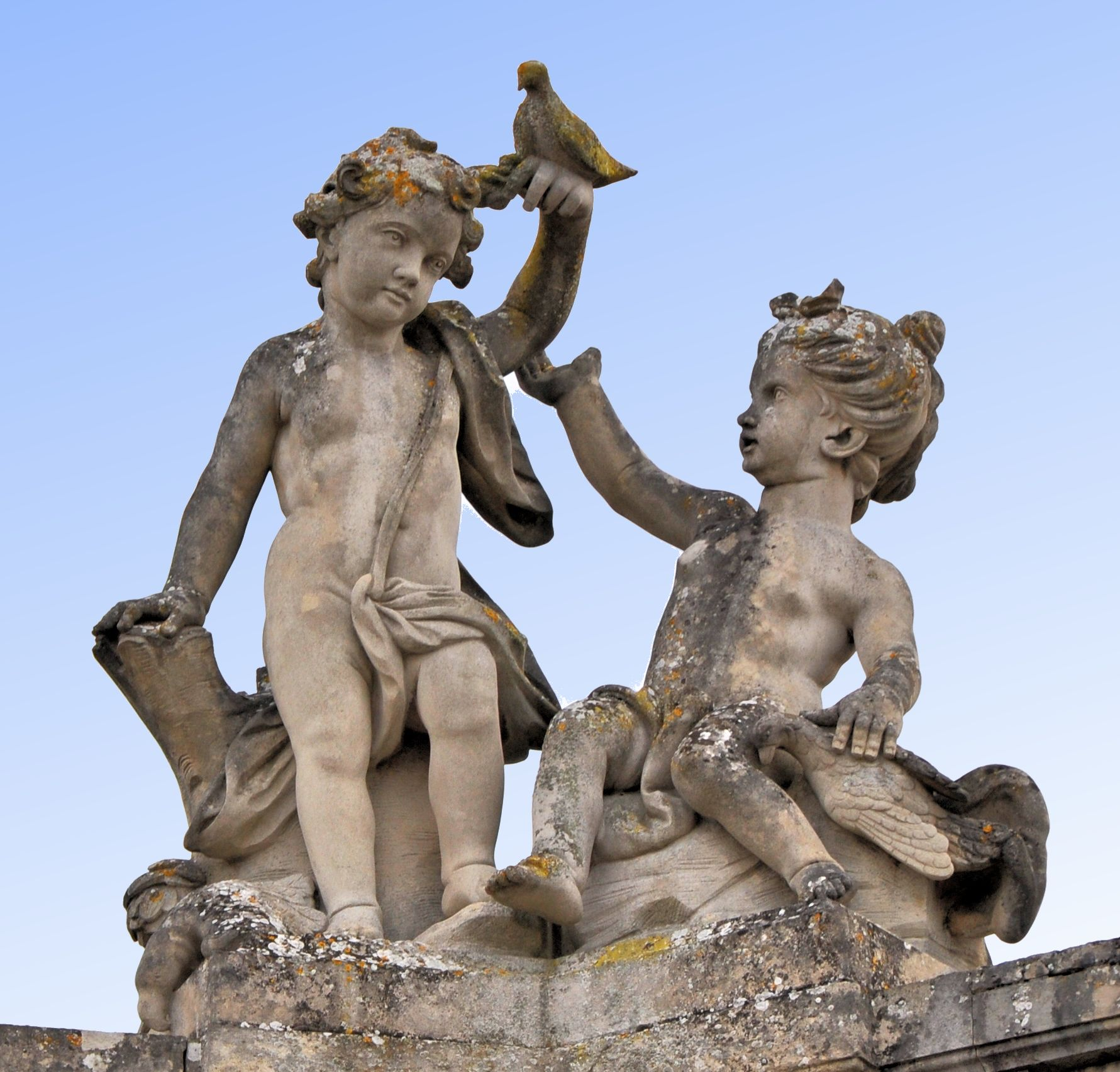
Towards the castle: children with birds. Air.

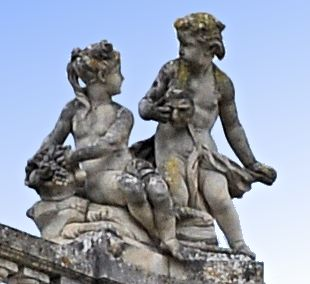
Towards the Fresh Pavilion: children with masks and fruit. The Earth.

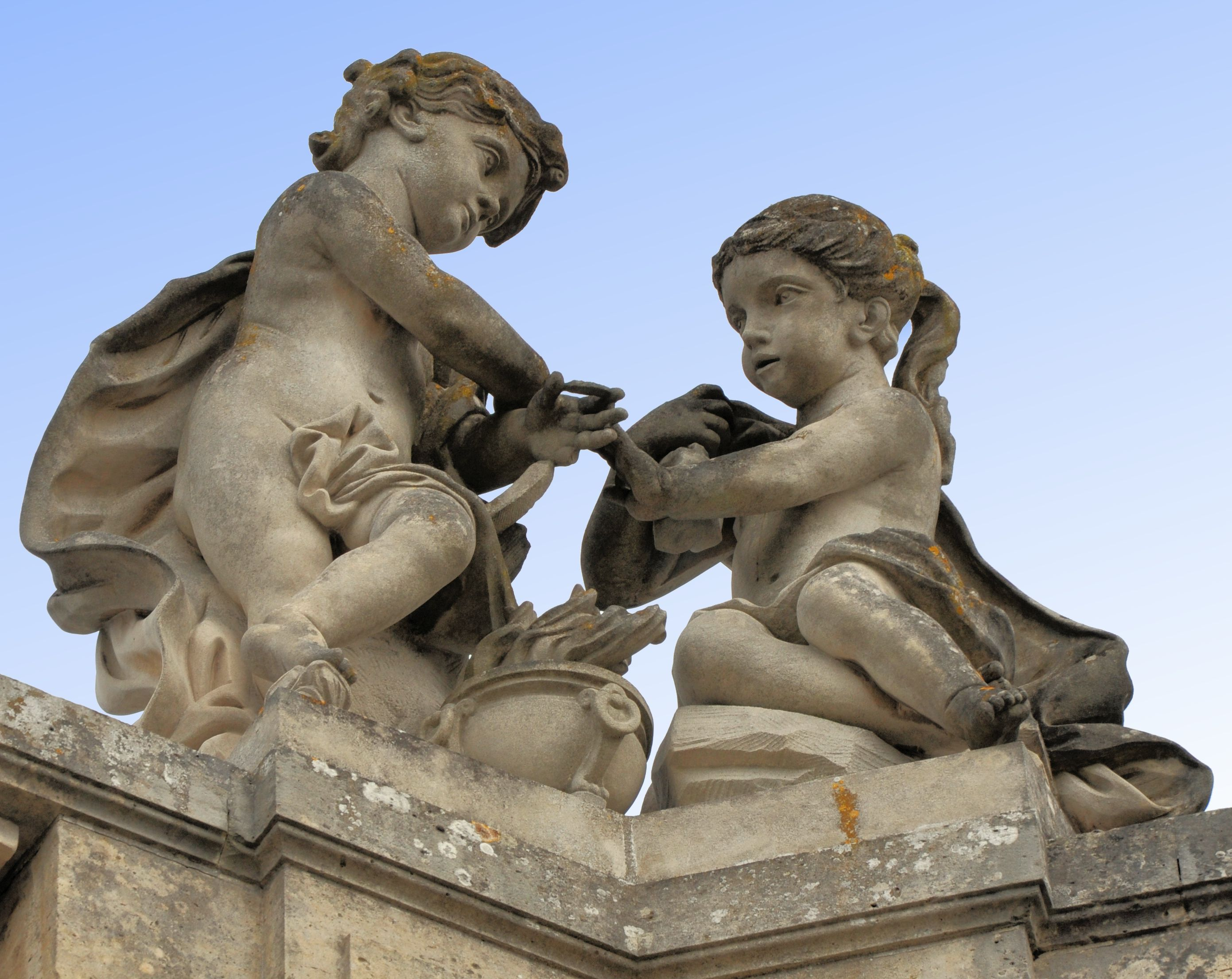
Towards the Grand Trianon: children at the brazier. The fire.

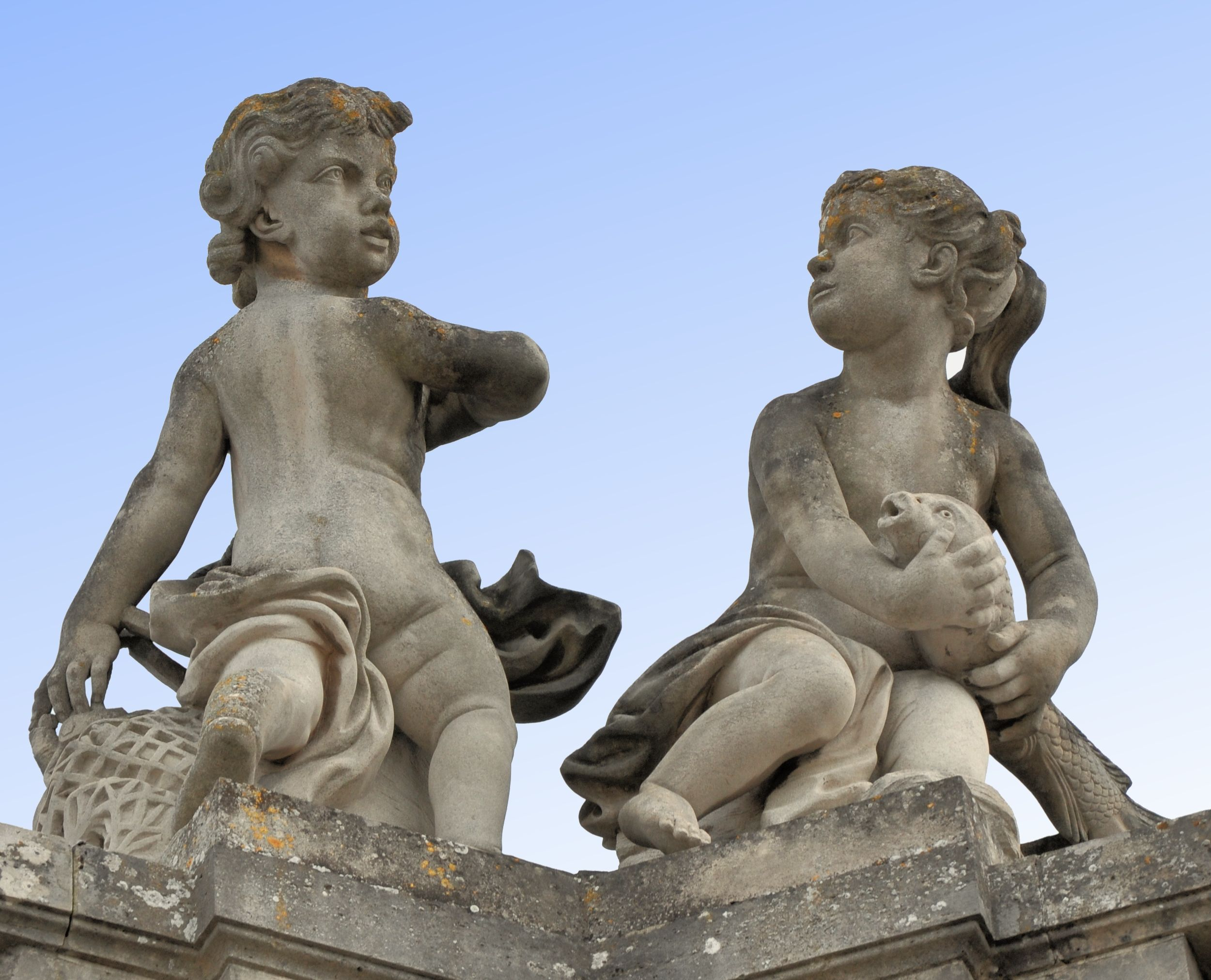
Towards the menagerie: fishing children. The water.

=== Central lounge ===
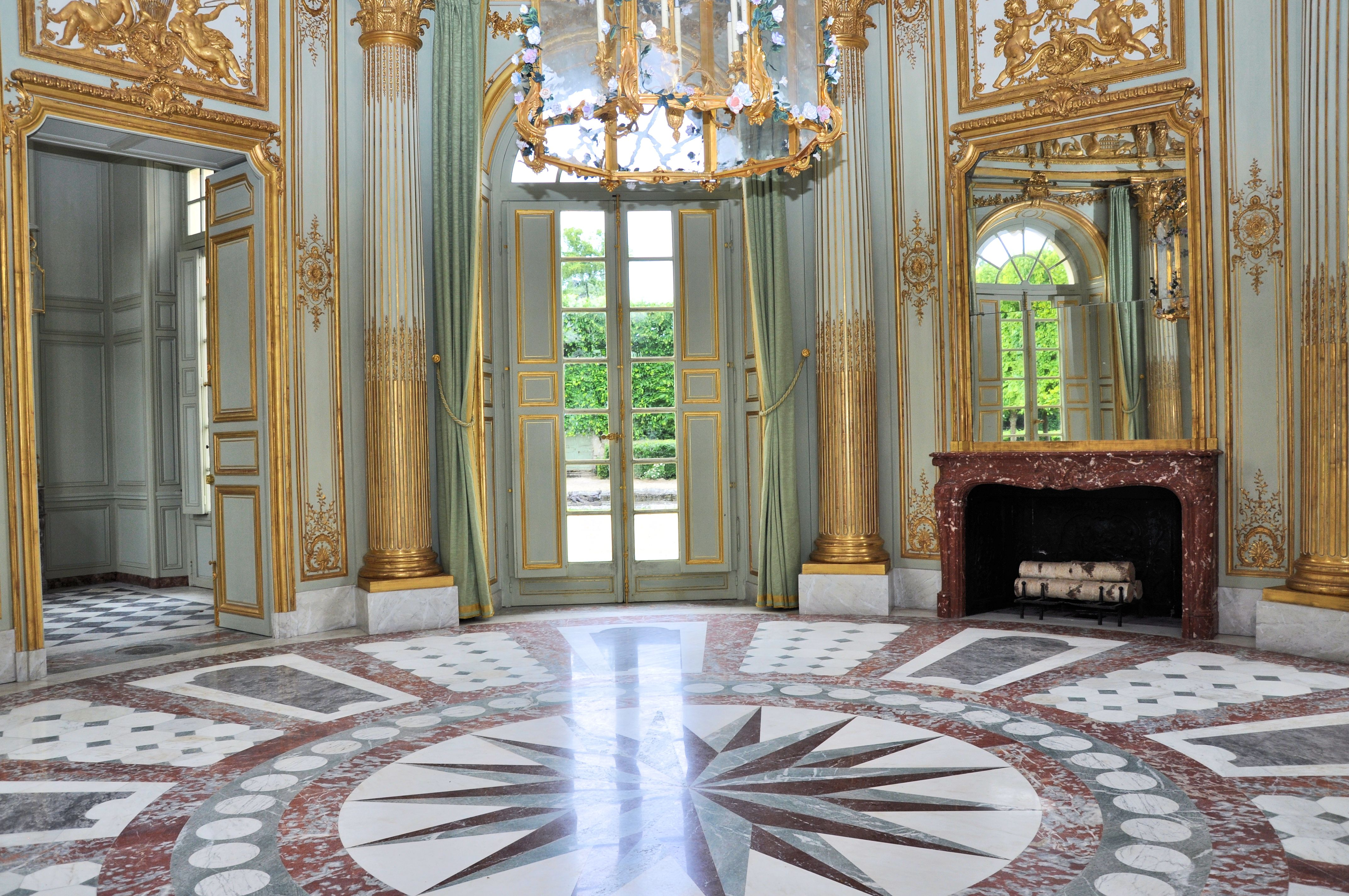
Central lounge of the French Pavilion.

The cornice of the central salon is supported by eight Corinthian columns. The frieze, decorated with farmyard animals, recalls, not without humour, the menagerie voisine: there are hens, roosters, pigeons, ducks and even a few swans, as well as Amours, above the door, playing with cages and baskets, and representing, in harmony with the exterior decoration, the four elements. This ornamentation is directly inspired by the King's and Madame de Pompadour's taste for domestic animals and gives the impression that nature is bursting into this pavilion, which blends in perfectly with the garden.

The wood panelling, executed by Jean-Antoine Guesnon and Christophe Clicot, was sculpted by Jacques Verbeckt in the Rococo style. During a restoration in the 19th century, a great deal of gilding was added to the woodwork, replacing the country colours in shades of yellow, green and blue created by the King's painter, Médard Brancourt, to match the furniture. This luxurious character, however, runs counter to the original spirit of a bucolic atmosphere.

Two large mirrors from opposite cabinets face each other. The floor is covered with marble in a variety of patterns and colours: turquoise blue and Campan green, Languedoc red and Italian cherry, and veined white. Under the Ancien Régime, it was covered in winter with a carpet from the Manufacture de la Savonnerie, designed by Jean-Baptiste Chevillion and perfectly suited to its circular shape. It was delivered in 1751 but disappeared during the Revolution.

On the ceiling, an eight-sided lantern with eight gilded copper fuses is decorated with garlands of flowers in Vincennes porcelain; the four small equivalent lanterns with five sides and five fuses have now disappeared. Celadon green gros de Tours curtains with gold braid replaced the originals, which were made of chamarré cotton canvas framed with green painted canvas and edged with gold braid. The furniture, which was dispersed during the Revolution and not found, consists of eighteen yellow-painted wooden chairs with gilded mouldings and covered in green and white Persian cloth edged with gold braid.

Central lounge doorframe

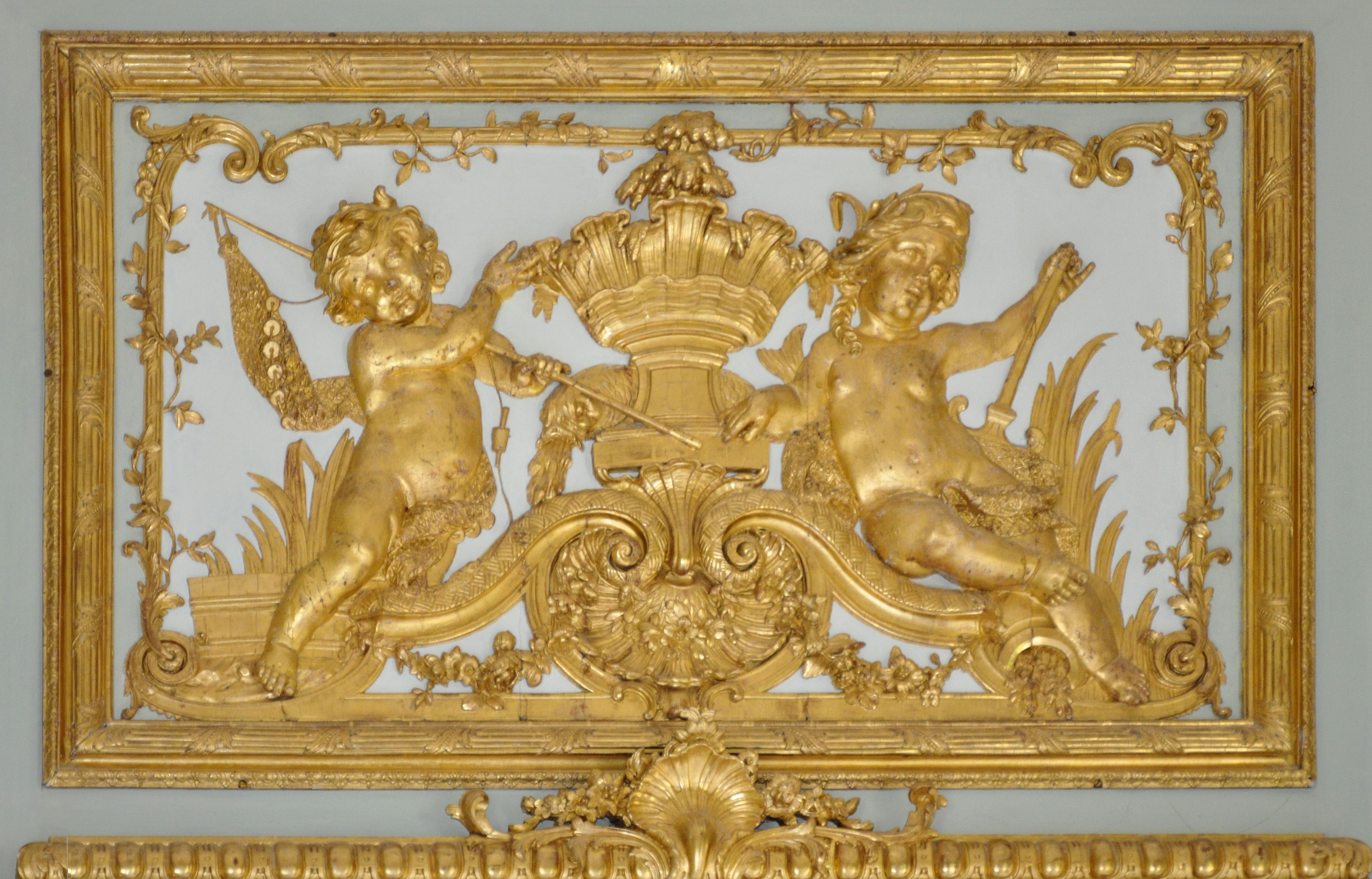
Door overlay to the warmer; allegory of Water.

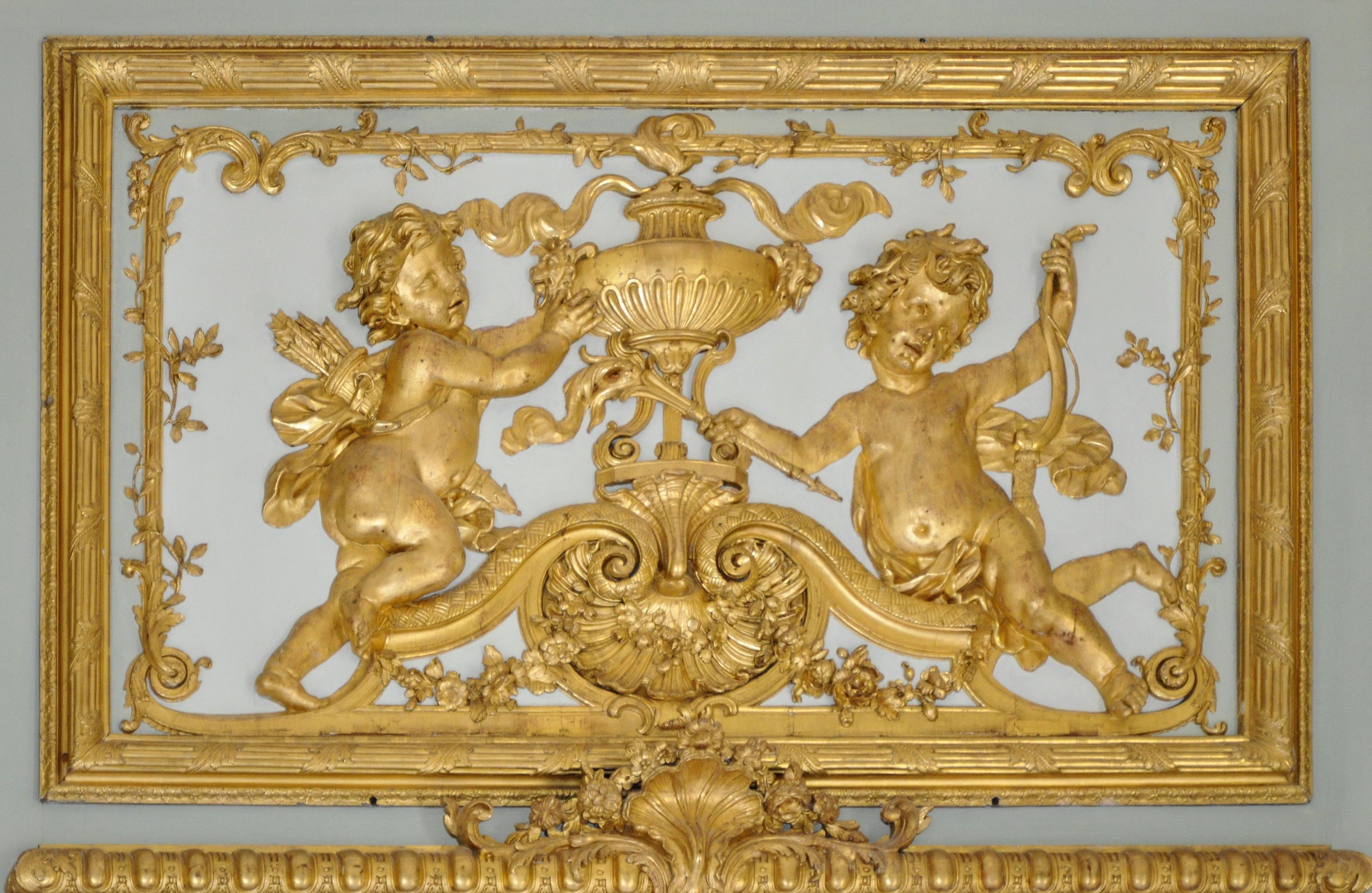
Door overlay to the coffee room; allegory of fire.

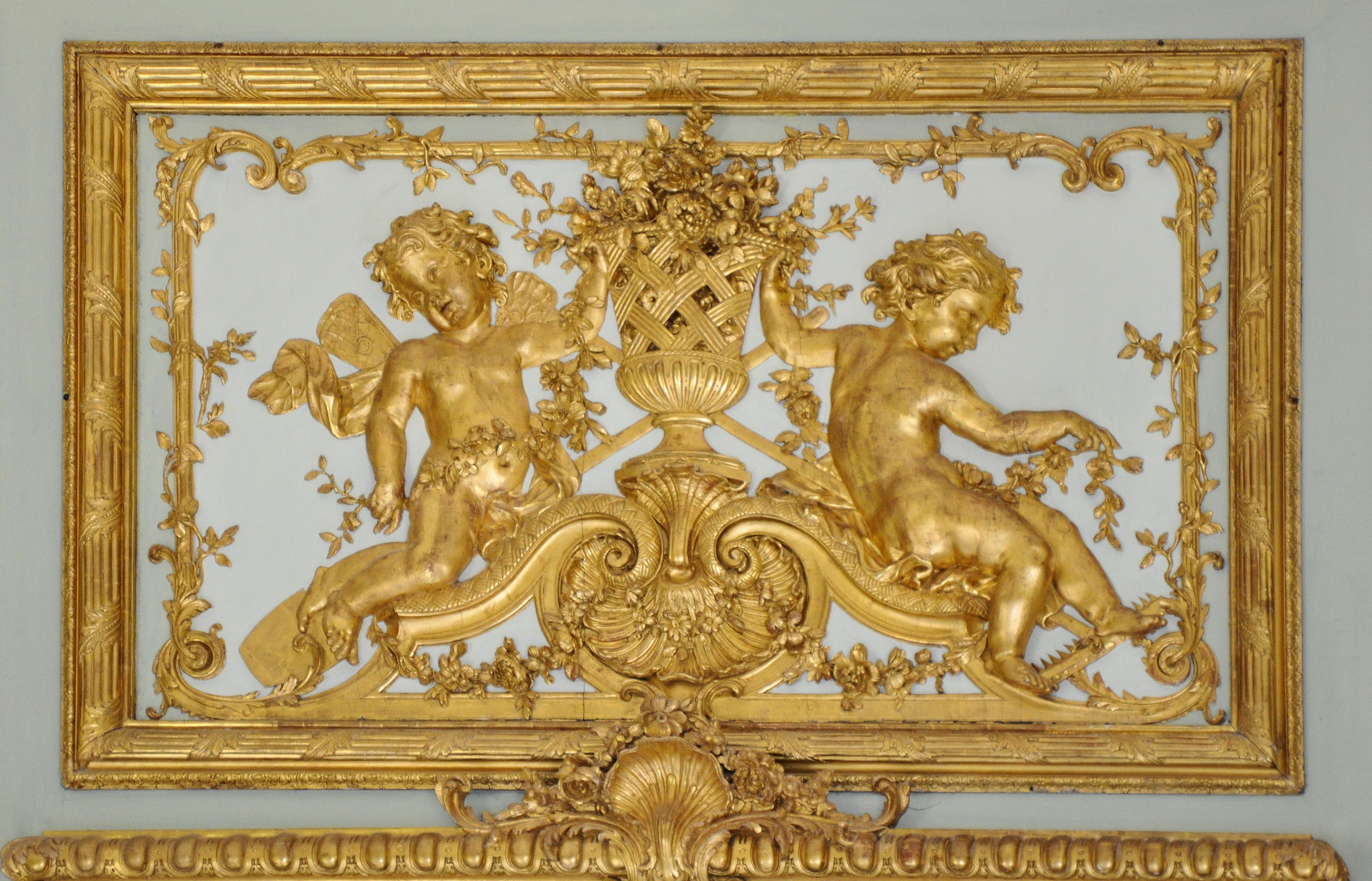
Doorframe to the boudoir; allegory of the Earth.

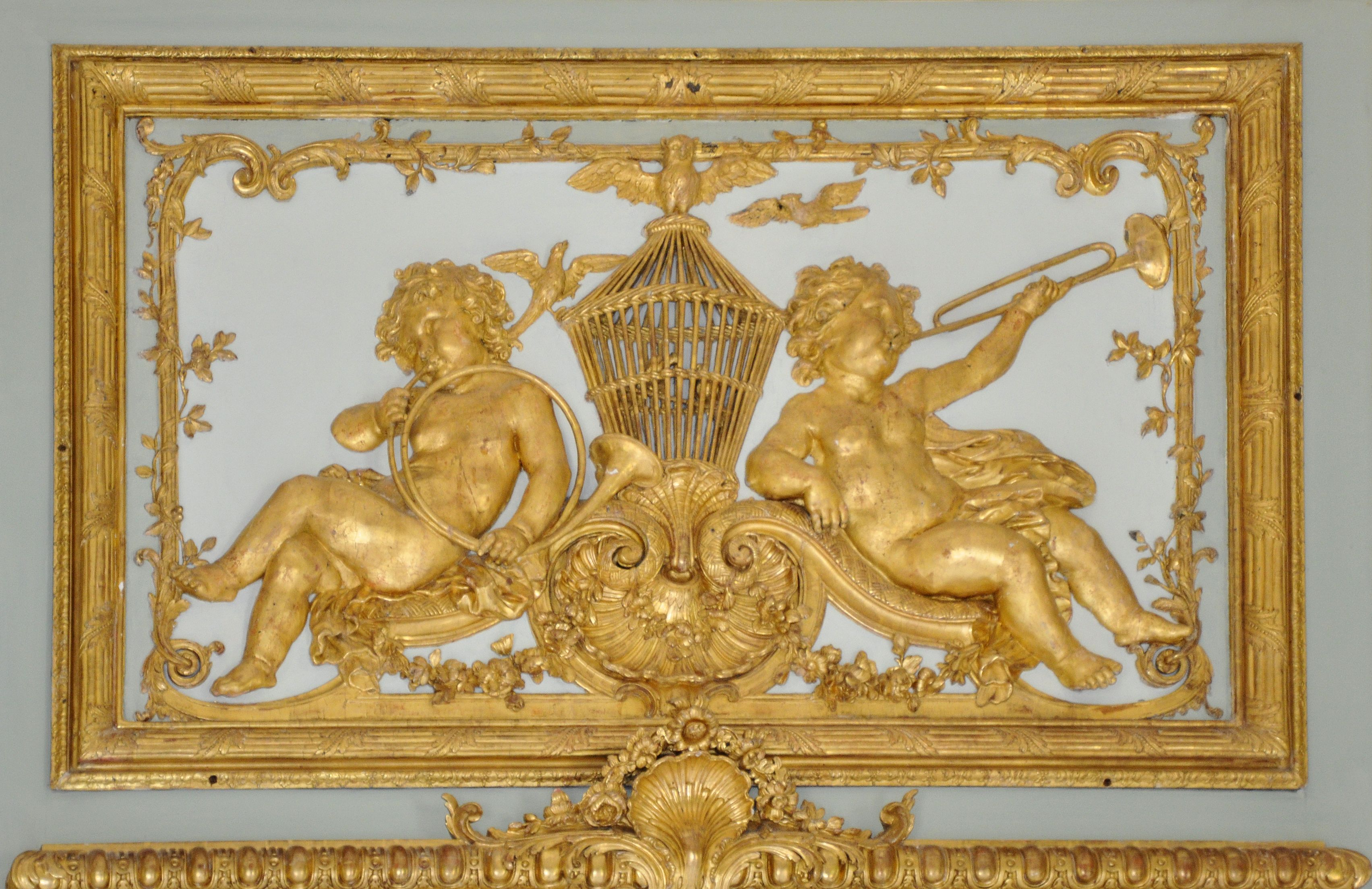
Door overlay to the antechamber; allegory of Air.

=== Small cabinets ===
The four cabinets are arranged on a diagonal axis in relation to the compositional lines of the garden and the views from the central salon towards the buildings surrounding the pavilion.

The boudoir on the left, facing the château, has a ceiling and panelling decorated with arabesques. Originally with a black and white marble floor, it now has a panelled parquet floor that was restored in 2008. Under Louis XV, there is a small rosewood table with a sliding shelf and a rack desk, used by the King for his herbarium. A yellow ottoman sofa is covered in white pekin. Opposite is an antechamber with simple panelling and a Languedoc marble fireplace.

The third room is a warming room, a small kitchen where food is kept warm, accessible only from the outside and equipped with a stove and a hood leaning against the fireplace in the central sitting room. It is made of painted stone and the floor slab is simple stone. The last room was originally divided in two: the part overlooking the drawing room had an "English-style place", fitted with modern valved equipment and made of rosewood, for the sake of comfort and privacy; (Note: In 1806, a new invention was installed on this toilet, featuring a natural rocking system, a new seat with molded lunette and a glass door. All have since disappeared.) the second part was reserved for the preparation of coffee, which King Louis XV had a particular taste for. Today, the partition has disappeared and a staircase has been created to lead to the underground installations.

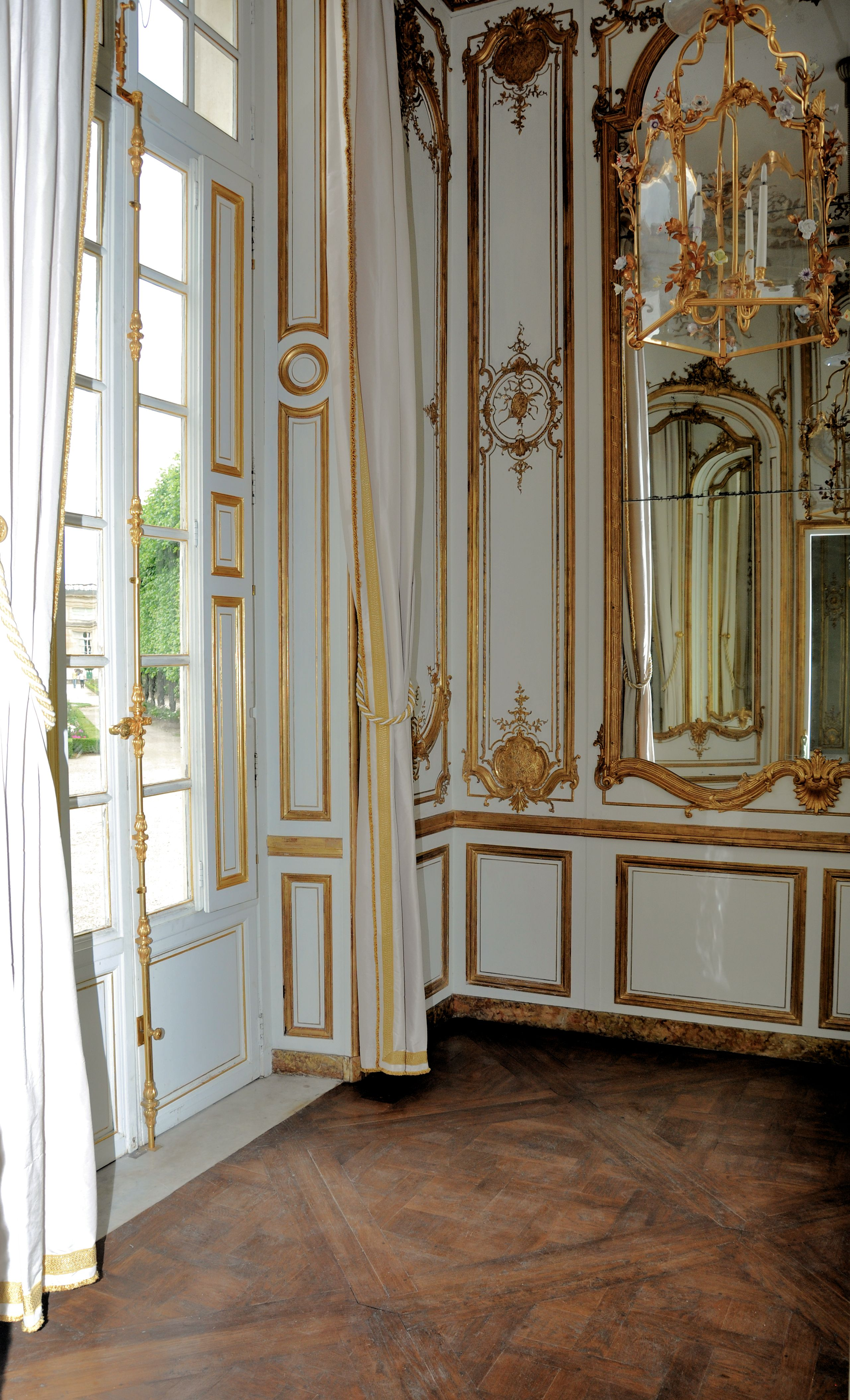
Boudoir.

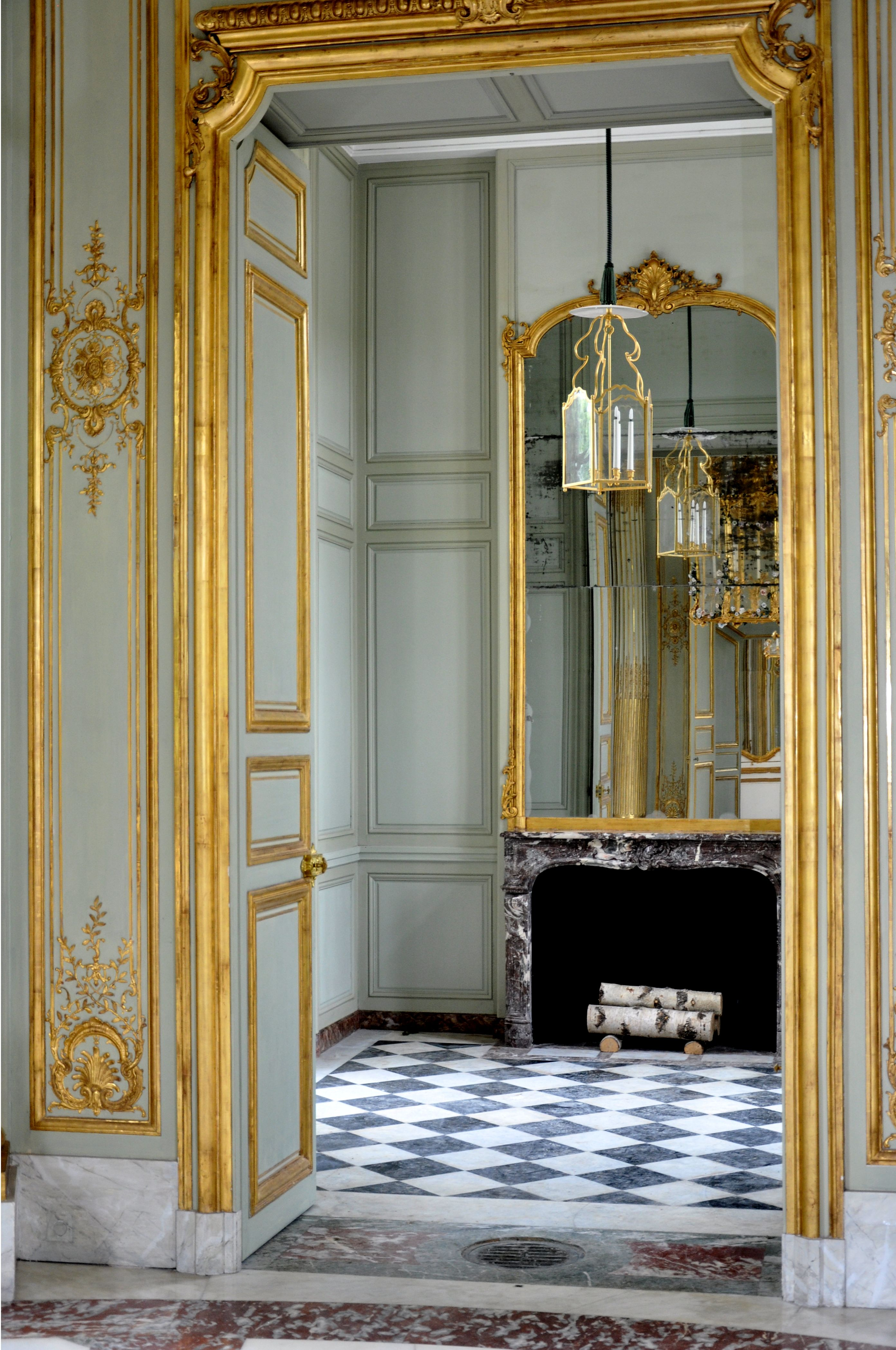
Anteroom.

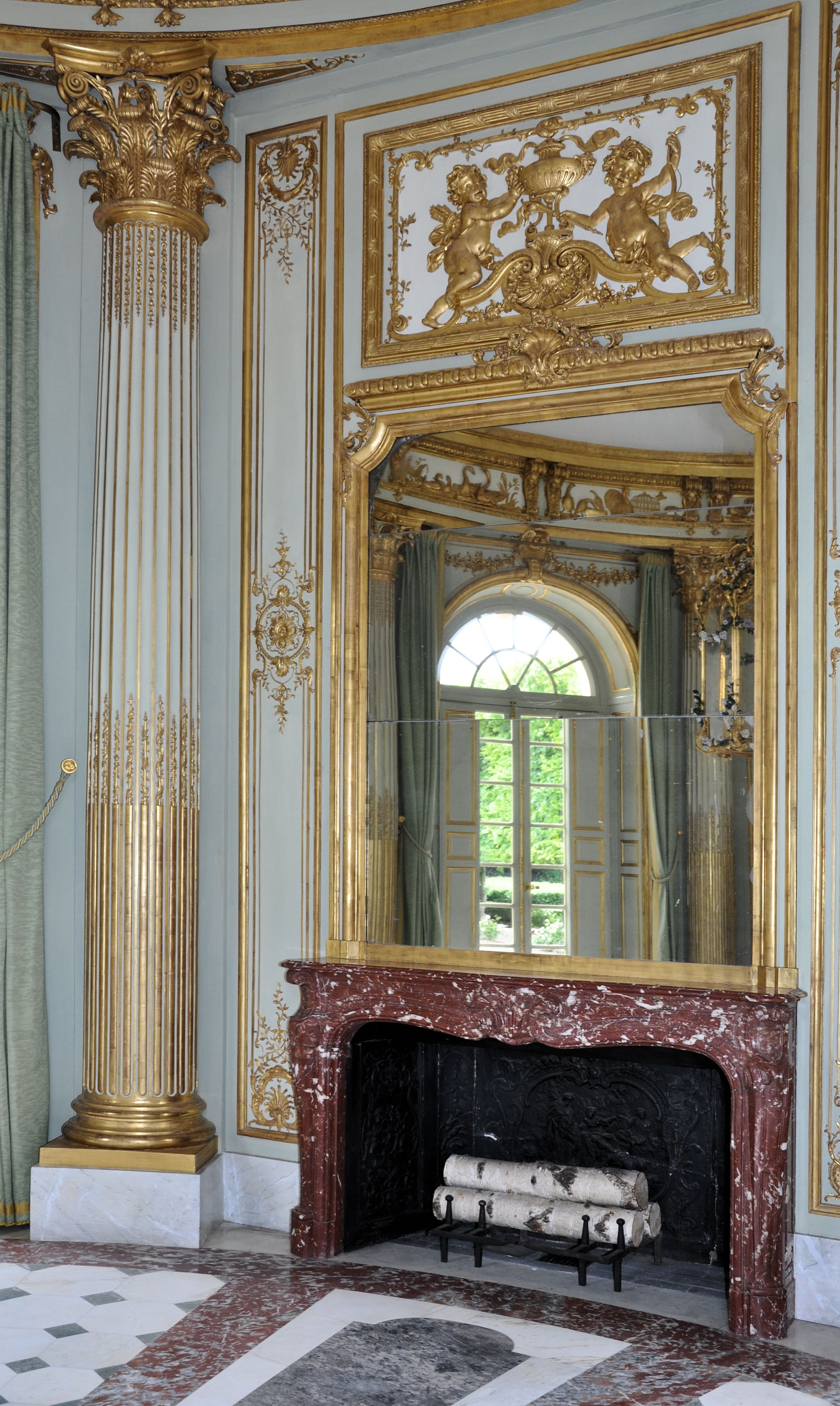
Fireplace overlooking the warming room.

== See also ==
- Petit Trianon
- Pavilion
- Folly
- French Pavilion

== Bibliography ==
- Desjardins, Gustave (1885). Le Petit Trianon: Histoire et description, Versailles, L. Bernard.
- Nolhac, Pierre de (1913). Le Trianon de Marie-Antoinette. Paris: Calmann-Lévy.
- Benoît, Jérémie (2009). Le Grand Trianon: Un palais privé à l'ombre de Versailles (préf. Pierre Arizzoli-Clémentel et Jean-Jacques Aillagon). Lathuile/Versailles: Éditions du Gui. ISBN 978-2-9517417-8-2.
- Ledoux-Lebard, Denise (1989). Versailles, le Petit Trianon : Le mobilier des inventaires de 1807, 1810 et 1839, (préf. Yves Bottineau). Paris: Les éditions de l'amateur. ISBN 2-85917-086-3.
- Pérouse, Jean-Marie de Montclos (2012). Ange-Jacques Gabriel: L'héritier d'une dynastie d'architectes. Paris: Éditions du patrimoine. ISBN 978-2-7577-0217-8.
- Baulez (Michel Gallet et Yves Bottineau), Christian (2004). Les Gabriel. Paris: Éditions Picard. ISBN 2-7084-0721-X.
