= The Judgement of Paris (Boucher) =

Painting by François Boucher

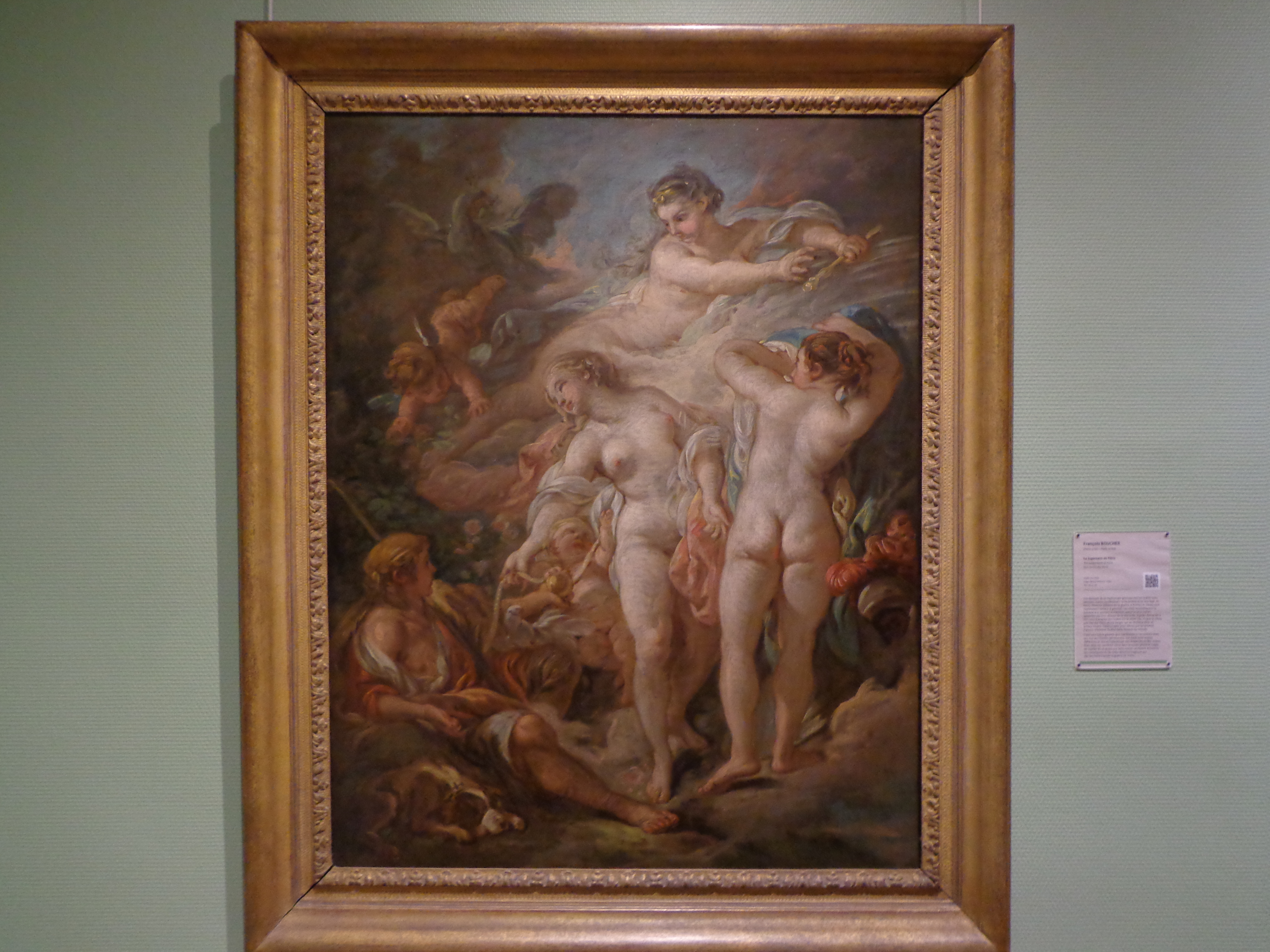
- Artist: François Boucher
- Year: c. 1763
- Medium: oil paint on canvas
- Movement: Rococo
- Subject: Judgement of Paris
- Dimensions: 110 cm × 86 cm (43 in × 34 in)
- Location: Musée des Beaux-Arts, Mulhouse
- Accession: 1961

The Judgement of Paris (French: Le Jugement de Pâris) is an oil-on-canvas mythological painting by the French Rococo artist François Boucher. It was painted c. 1763 and belongs to the Musée des Beaux-Arts of Mulhouse, France. Its inventory number is 61.1.16.

The painting was bequeathed to the museum by Alfred Wallach (1882–1961). Its authenticity as a genuine Boucher had been disputed until the British specialist Alastair Laing established that it was indeed painted by the master himself. Two 1763 preparatory drawings have survived, one depicting Aphrodite with Eros (now in the Albertina in Vienna), and the other one depicting Athena (current location unknown).

A similar work by Boucher on the same theme, dated 1754, is owned by the Wallace Collection in London.
