= Lovers in a Park =

Painting by François Boucher

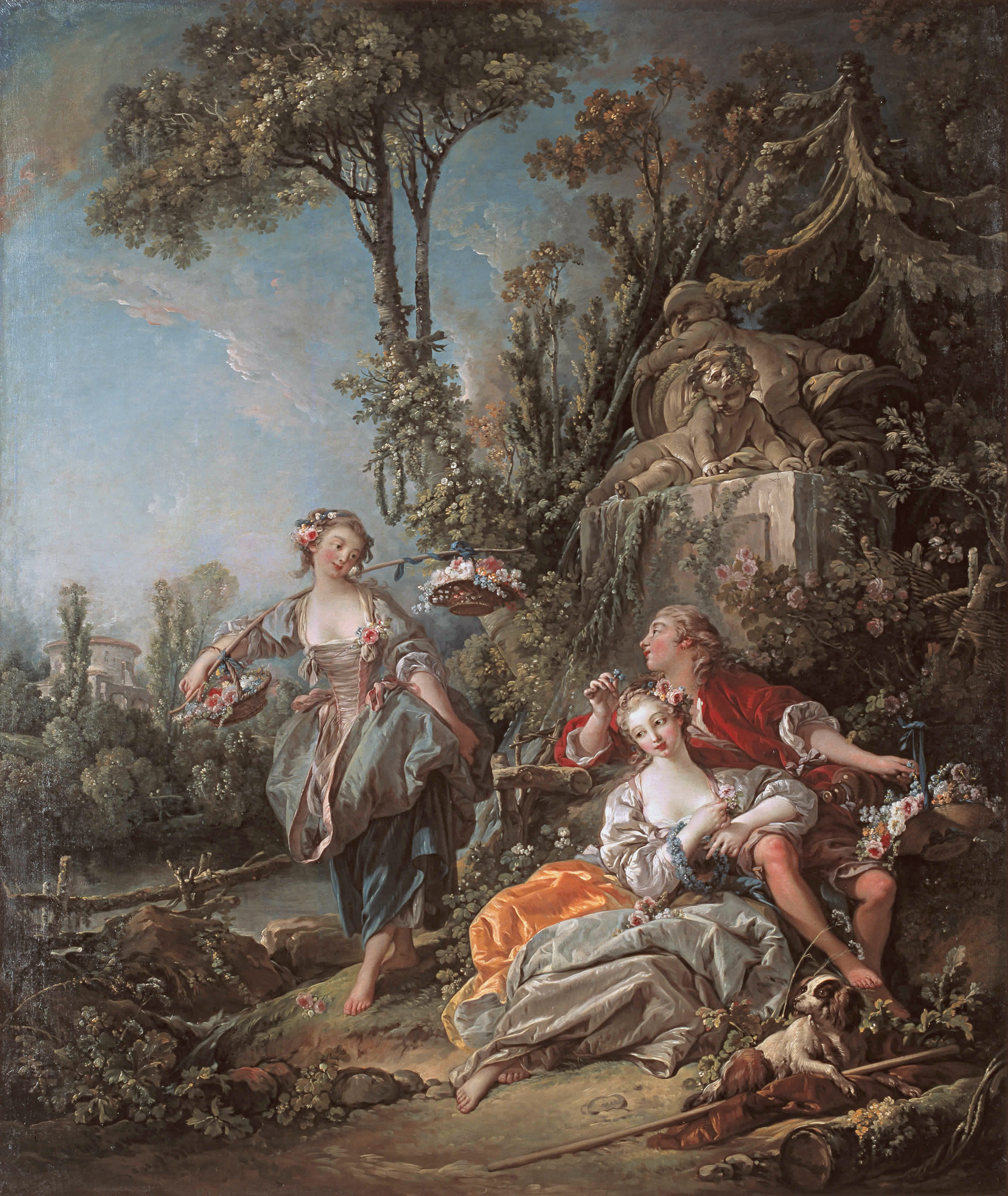
- The painting in the Timken Museum of Art, 2016
- Artist: François Boucher
- Year: 1758
- Medium: Oil on canvas
- Dimensions: 232.5 cm × 195 cm (91.5 in × 77 in)
- Location: Timken Museum of Art, San Diego, California, U.S.

Lovers in a Park is a 1758 oil painting on canvas by the French artist François Boucher. It is in the Timken Museum of Art, in San Diego. It depicts a scene that takes place in a park with a luscious vegetation, where a couple of lovers is surprised by a female peasant who is passing by. The painting is a characteristic example of Boucher's Rococo style.
