= Jupiter and Callisto (Boucher, 1759) =

Painting by François Boucher

Jupiter in the Guise of Diana and the Nymph Callisto
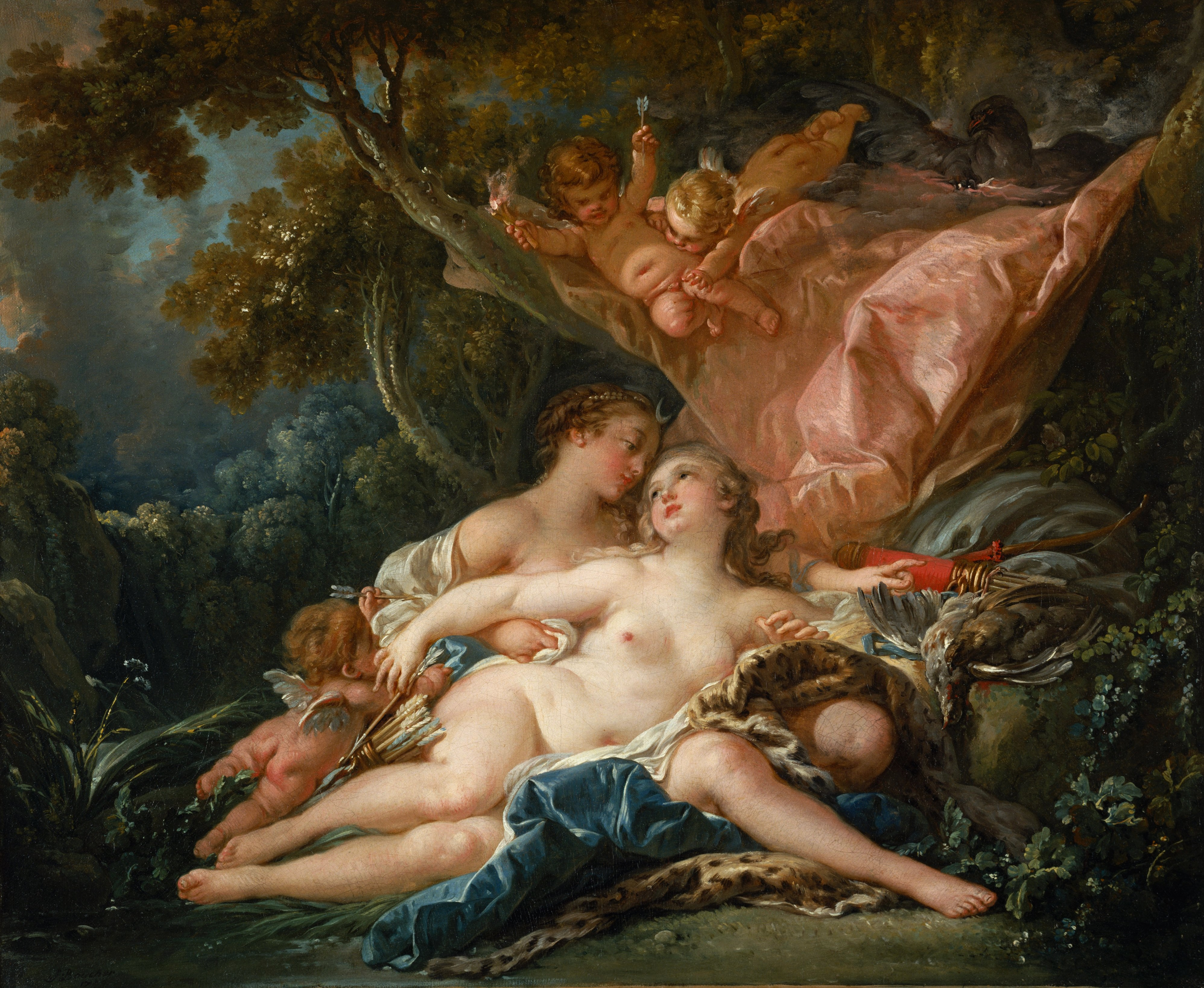
- Artist: François Boucher
- Year: 1759
- Dimensions: 57.79 cm × 69.85 cm (22.75 in × 27.50 in)
- Location: Nelson-Atkins Museum of Art, Kansas City

Jupiter and Callisto or The Nymph Callisto Seduced by Jupiter in the Guise of Diana is a 1759 oil painting on canvas by the French Rococo painter François Boucher, now in the Nelson-Atkins Museum of Art in Kansas City, United States.

It shows Jupiter seducing Callisto whilst disguised as Diana.
