= Pompadour at Her Toilette =

Painting by François Boucher

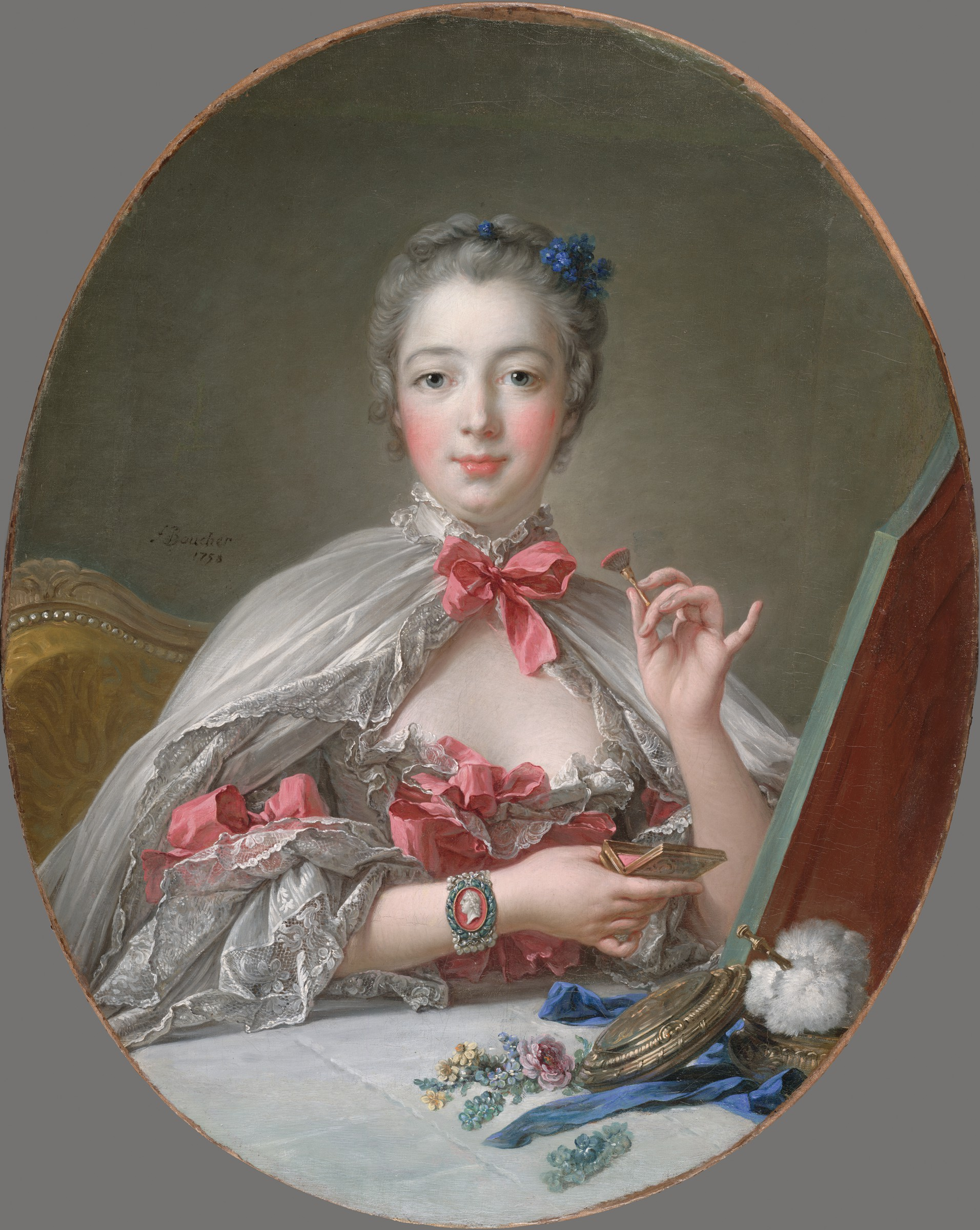
- Artist: François Boucher
- Year: 1750
- Medium: Oil on canvas
- Dimensions: 81 cm × 65 cm (32 in × 26 in)
- Location: Harvard Art Museums, Cambridge, MA

Pompadour at Her Toilette is an oil-on-canvas painting by François Boucher from 1750 (with later additions) depicting Madame de Pompadour, the mistress of King Louis XV of France.

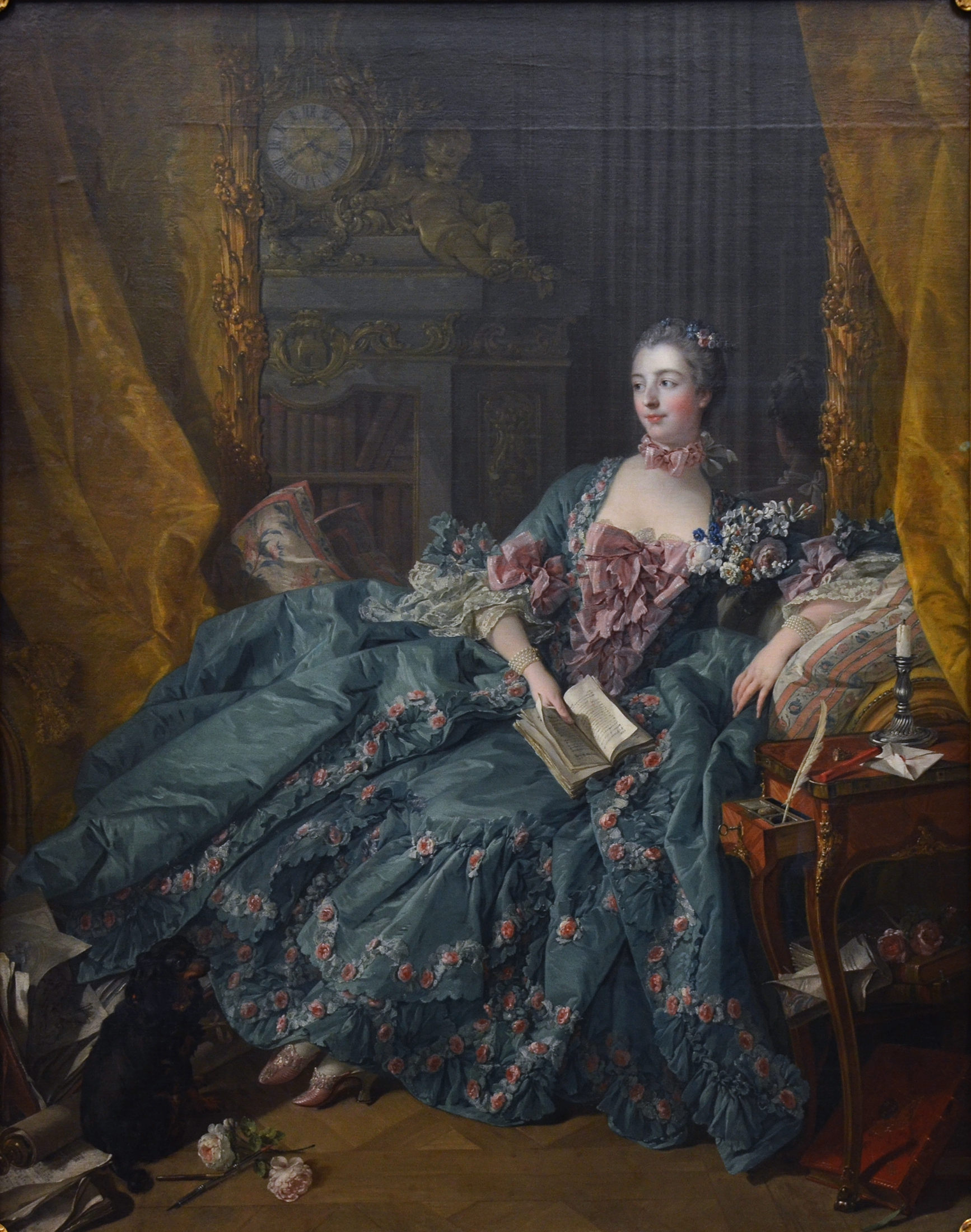
Boucher's painting titled "Madame de Pompadour" also demonstrates the Rococo style

The format of the painting changed several times after its initial creation. It was originally a small, rectangular bust, closely cropped around Pompadour's face. Boucher later enlarged the canvas with several rectangular strips, adding in the surrounding toilette scene. Sometime in the late eighteenth century, the painting was again adjusted to give it an oval format. The expanded composition is significant for its representation of Pompadour in the act of applying her rouge makeup. Further, the addition of rouge makeup connects to popular trends of pink skin at the time. Art historians have interpreted the depiction of makeup in the scene along with the many additions and changes to the composition as an exploration of Pompadour's agency in fashioning her own image.

== Context and description ==
Boucher composed the painting in 1750, when Madame de Pompadour was 37 years old. At the time, she was suffering from migraines, fevers, seizures, and other ailments. Her body became thin and bony due to weight loss, and her complexion became jaundiced and wrinkled. Thus, the portrait, which shows her healthy figure and smooth white skin, is more representative of her past beauty and youth, which had won her the position of being the king's favorite mistress.

Boucher's use of delicate brushstrokes, pastel colors, and sensuous subject matter reflects the characteristics of the Rococo movement. The application of makeup further relates to the Rococo emphasis on surface decoration and artifice. Pale pink and white dominate Boucher's palette in this painting, which aligns with the most popular cosmetic colors at the time. Through his use of pale pink and white, Boucher is able to draw an analogy between oil paint and makeup, connecting the art of painting to the rituals of the toilette. The blue flowers in Madame de Pompadour's hair and the blue ribbons by the mirror serve as a contrast to the dominant pink hues. The light and feathery brushstrokes Boucher uses create an illusion of applying powder to the face further connect the actions of the artist and the patron.

== Relationship between Pompadour and Boucher ==
Madame de Pompadour had a longstanding artistic relationship with Boucher, often commissioning him to paint her portraits. In particular, Pompadour at Her Toilette can be seen as a collaborative work between Madame de Pompadour and Boucher. As an artist in the eighteenth century, Boucher was a prominent figure in the Rococo movement. However, his characteristic color palette garnered both admiration and criticism.

Boucher's pink and pastel colors along with his feathery brushstrokes work together to represent his distinctive artistic style as a Rococo artist. Similarly, Madame de Pompadour utilized Boucher's technique to convey her own self-image. While Boucher executed the painting, Madame de Pompadour guided the vision and dictated her own representation as an important and wealthy woman. This collaboration rendered the painting a reflection of both the artist and the patron.

The painting Pompadour at Her Toilette is novel in its two-fold approach to self-representation in art-making. The portrayal of Madame de Pompadour applying makeup parallels to Boucher's application of oil paint on the canvas, blurring the lines between the roles of artist and subject. The autonomy displayed by Madame de Pompadour suggests that she was equally an executor of the image, rather than merely its subject.

== Use of makeup ==
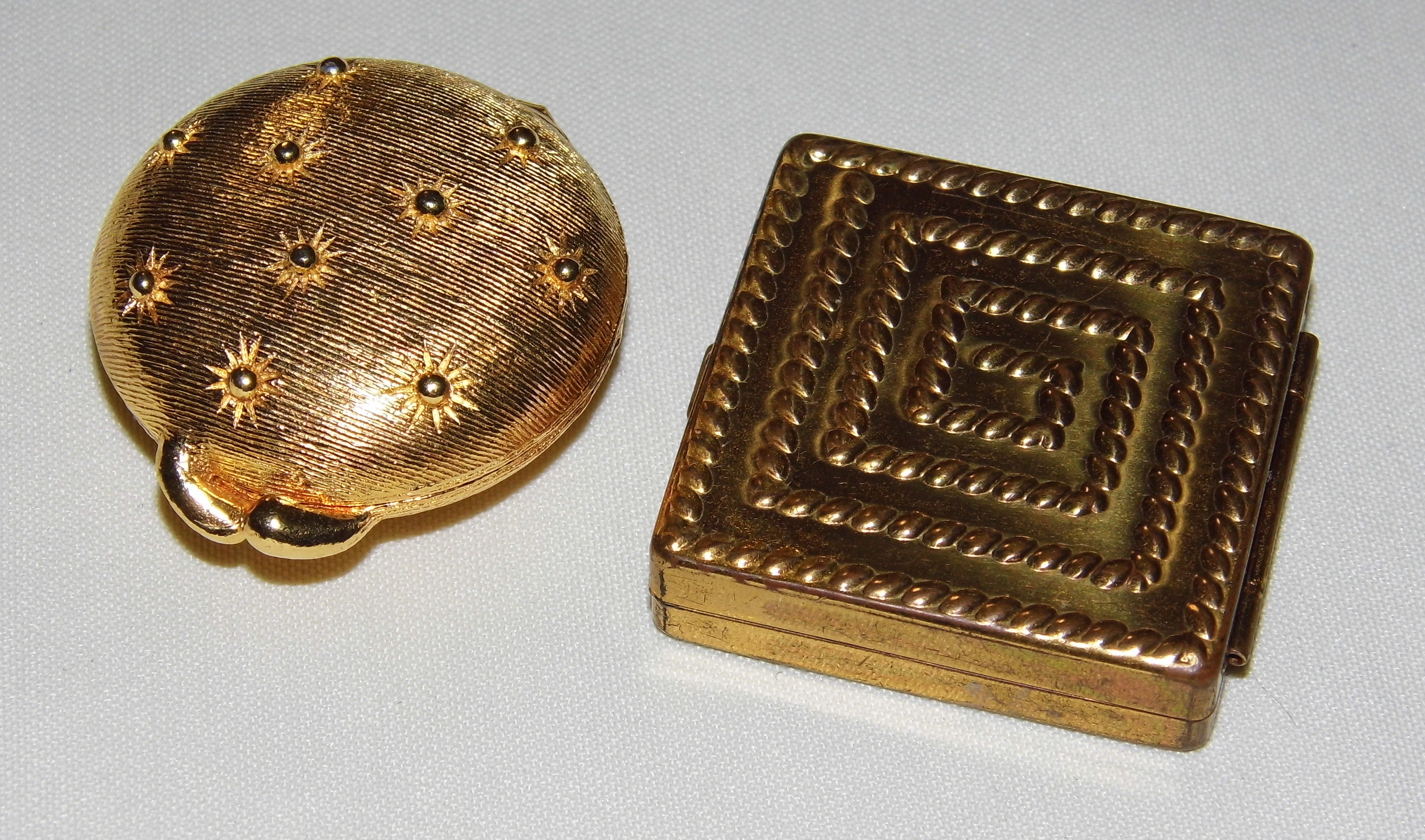
A pair vintage rouge compacts

In one hand, Madame de Pompadour holds a small rectangular tin of rouge, and in the other, she wields a cosmetic brush freshly dipped in the color, poised to apply it to her skin. In the eighteenth century, rouge makeup served as a stark contrast to pale skin, enhancing its whiteness, which was considered a standard of beauty. Historically, rouge also symbolized higher social status and courtly elegance.

Madame de Pompadour's appointment to lady-in-waiting over the more respectable and saintly woman Marie Leszczyńska generated controversy in 1756. Madame de Pompadour's new role breached court etiquette, as the role was typically reserved for ladies of the most ancient and noble lineage. It was expected that, in her new role, Madame de Pompadour would give up her frivolous gowns and rouge makeup. Instead, she appeared at court more lavishly adorned and made up than ever before. Madame de Pompadour's decision to defy tradition and maintain her extravagant dress and makeup reflects her autonomy in defining her identity, irrespective of societal expectations.

Madame de Pompadour used makeup to assert her wealth and elevated status at court, disregarding those who deemed her unworthy. While Madame de Pompadour occupied an important social position, her bold display of French-made rouge can be interpreted as an embrace of French market products during this period and a demonstration of her fashionable tastes. Furthermore, her aim was to forge a closer relationship between the emerging wealthy French aristocracy and the monarchy. Hence, the use of rouge makeup served as a visual marker of her wealth and social standing, allowing her, as a mistress, to project the image of a high-class courtly woman and symbolically enhance her image.
