= Pastoral with a Couple near a Fountain =

Painting by François Boucher

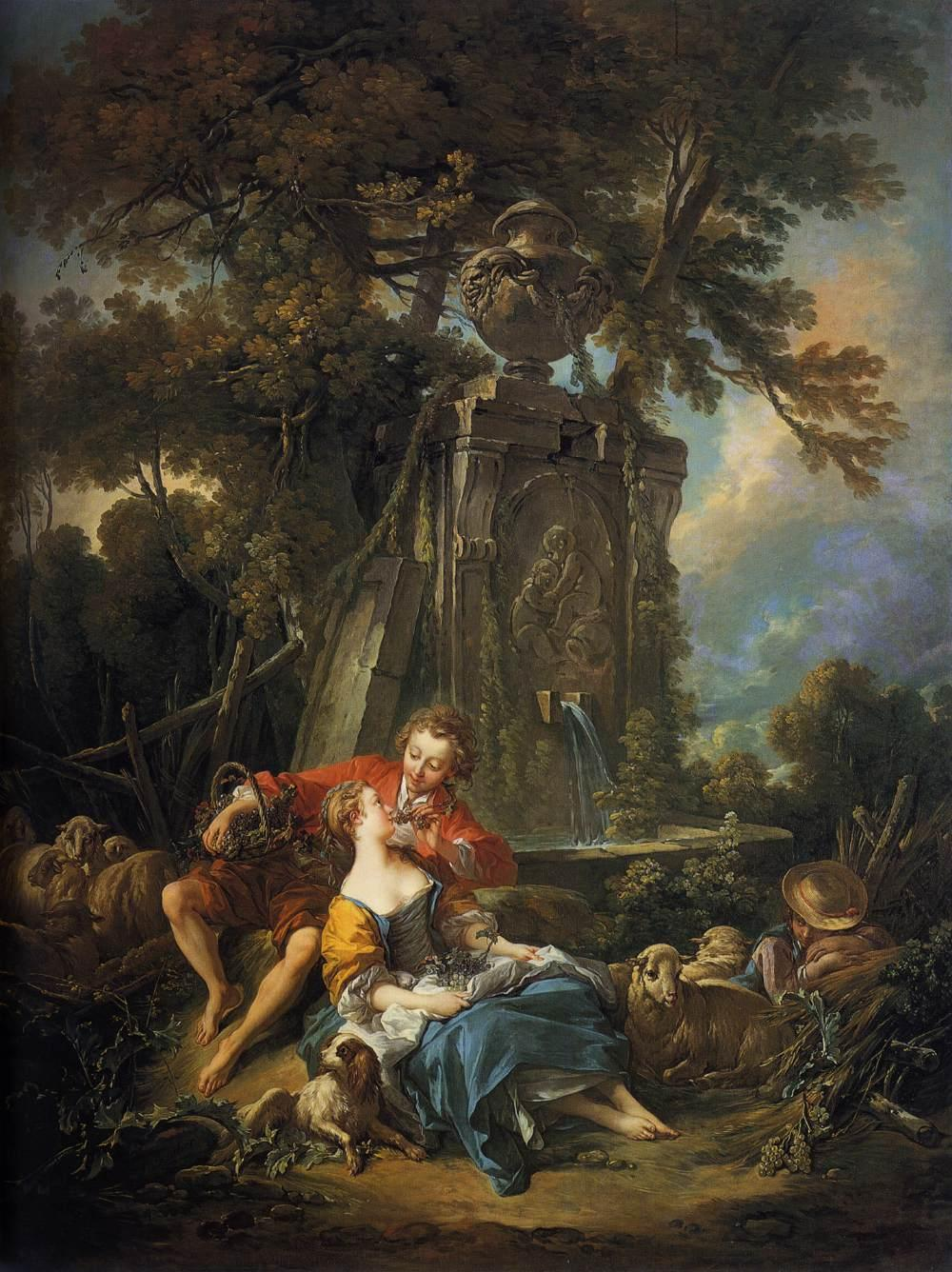
- Artist: François Boucher
- Year: 1749
- Medium: Oil on canvas
- Dimensions: 198 cm × 259 cm (78 in × 102 in)
- Location: Wallace Collection, London

Pastoral with a Couple near a Fountain or An Autumn Pastoral is an oil on canvas painting by the French Rococo artist François Boucher, created in 1749. It is held in the Wallace Collection, in London.
