= Fishing (Boucher) =

Painting by François Boucher

- La pêche à la ligne (French)
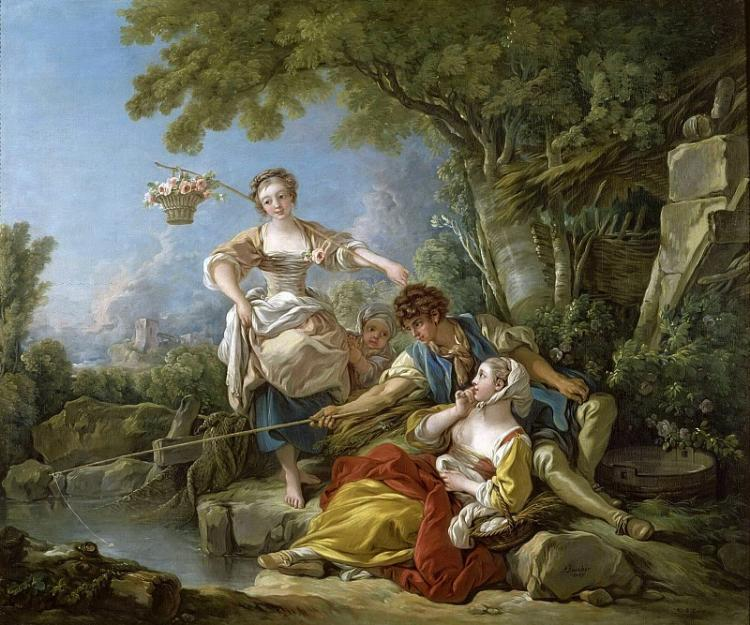
- Artist: François Boucher
- Year: 1757
- Medium: oil on canvas
- Dimensions: 150 cm × 188 cm (59 in × 74 in)
- Location: Grand Trianon; Paris

Fishing (French: La pêche à la ligne) is a painting executed in 1757 by the French Rococo artist François Boucher.

== Description ==
The painting is an oil on canvas with dimensions of 150 x 188 centimeters. It is in the collection of the Grand Trianon, in Versailles.

== Sources ==
- Pierre Lemoine (ed.) Versailles and Trianon: Guide to the Museum and National Domain of Versailles and Trianon, Réunion des musées nationaux, 1990
