= François Boucher =

French painter (1703–1770)

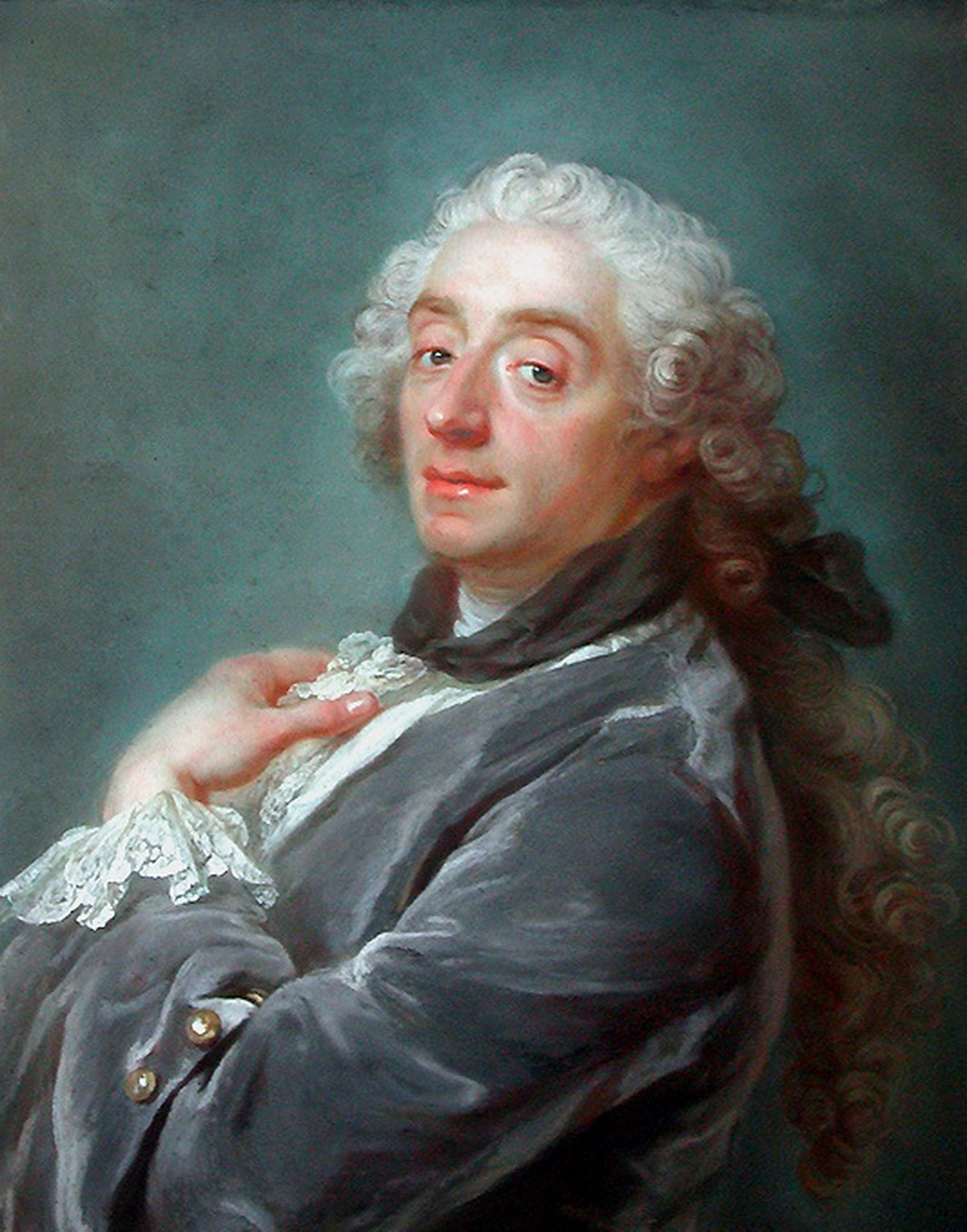
- Portrait by Gustaf Lundberg (1741)
- Born: 29 September 1703; Paris, France
- Died: 30 May 1770 (aged 66); Paris, France
- Known for: Painting
- Movement: Rococo

Signature
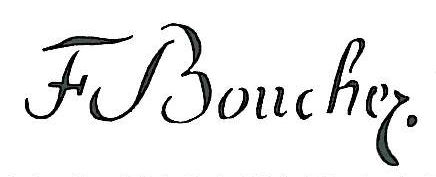

François Boucher (UK: /ˈbuːʃeɪ/ BOO-shay, US: /buːˈʃeɪ/ boo-SHAY; French: [fʁɑ̃swa buʃe]; 29 September 1703 – 30 May 1770) was a French painter, draughtsman and etcher, who worked in the Rococo style. Boucher is known for his idyllic and voluptuous paintings on classical themes, decorative allegories, and pastoral scenes. He was perhaps the most celebrated painter and decorative artist of the 18th century.

== Life ==
A native of Paris, Boucher was the son of a lesser known painter Nicolas Boucher, who gave him his first artistic training. At the age of seventeen, a painting by Boucher was admired by the painter François Lemoyne. Lemoyne later appointed Boucher as his apprentice, but after only three months, he went to work for the engraver Jean-François Cars.

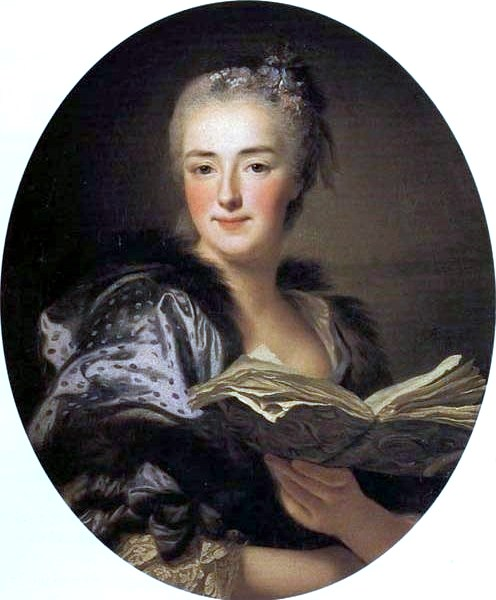
Portrait of Marie-Jeanne Buzeau, wife of Boucher by Alexander Roslin

In 1720, he won the elite Grand Prix de Rome for painting, but did not take up the consequential opportunity to study in Italy until five years later, due to financial problems at the Académie royale de peinture et de sculpture. On his return from studying in Italy he was admitted to the refounded Académie de peinture et de sculpture on 24 November 1731. His morceau de réception (reception piece) was his Rinaldo and Armida of 1734.

Boucher married Marie-Jeanne Buzeau in 1733. The couple had three children together. Boucher became a faculty member in 1734 and his career accelerated from this point as he was promoted Professor then Rector of the academy, becoming inspector at the Royal Gobelins Manufactory and finally Premier Peintre du Roi (First Painter of the King) in 1765.

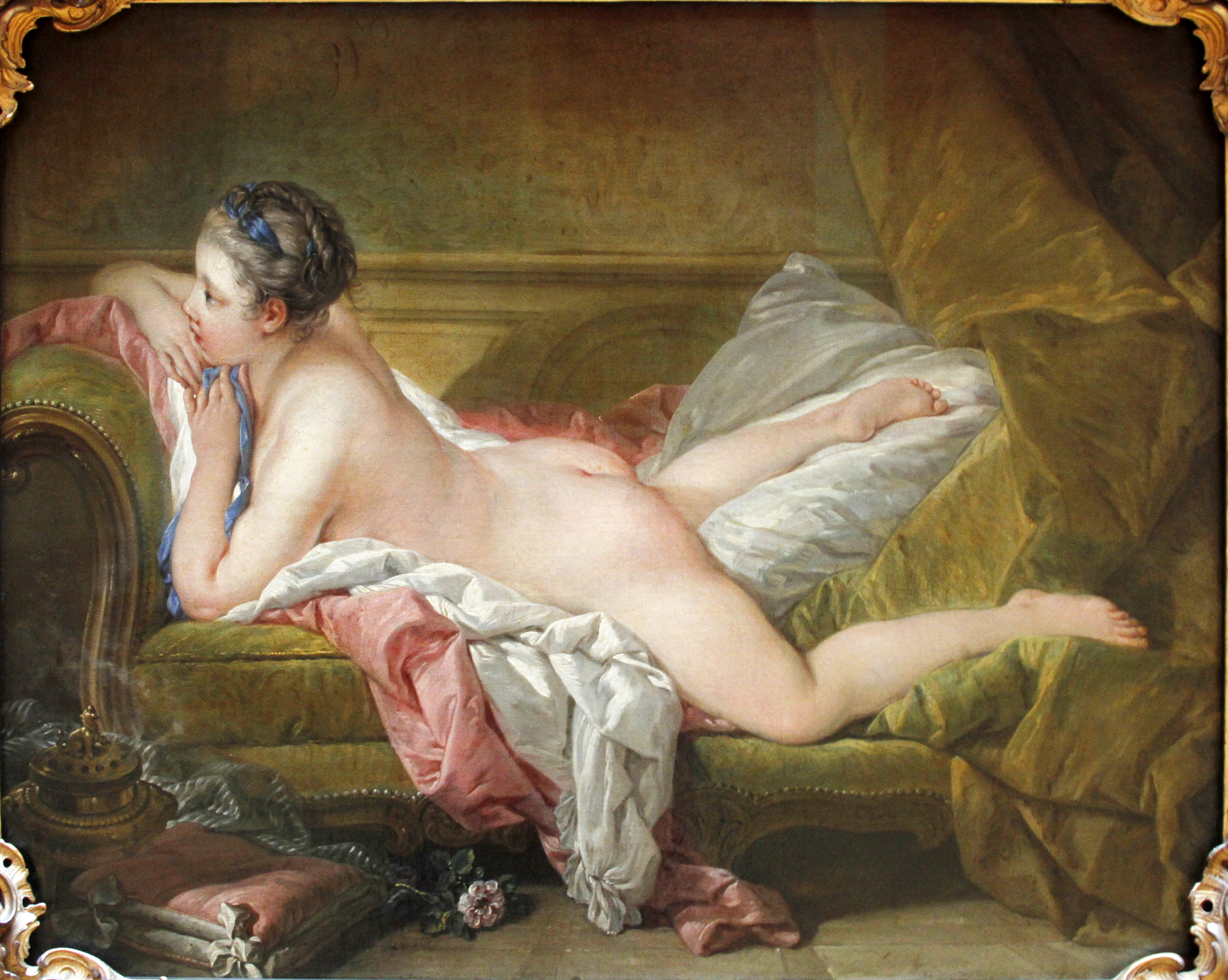
The Blonde Odalisque or Resting Girl, (thought to be Marie-Louise O'Murphy) c. 1752

Boucher died on 30 May 1770 in his native Paris. His name, along with that of his patron Madame de Pompadour, had become synonymous with the French Rococo style, leading the Goncourt brothers to write: "Boucher is one of those men who represent the taste of a century, who express, personify and embody it."

Boucher is famous for saying that nature is "trop verte et mal éclairée" (too green and badly lit).

Boucher was associated with the gemstone engraver Jacques Guay, whom he taught to draw. He also mentored the Moravian-Austrian painter Martin Ferdinand Quadal as well as the neoclassical painter Jacques-Louis David in 1767. Later, Boucher made a series of drawings of works by Guay which Madame de Pompadour then engraved and distributed as a handsomely bound volume to favored courtiers.

== Painting ==
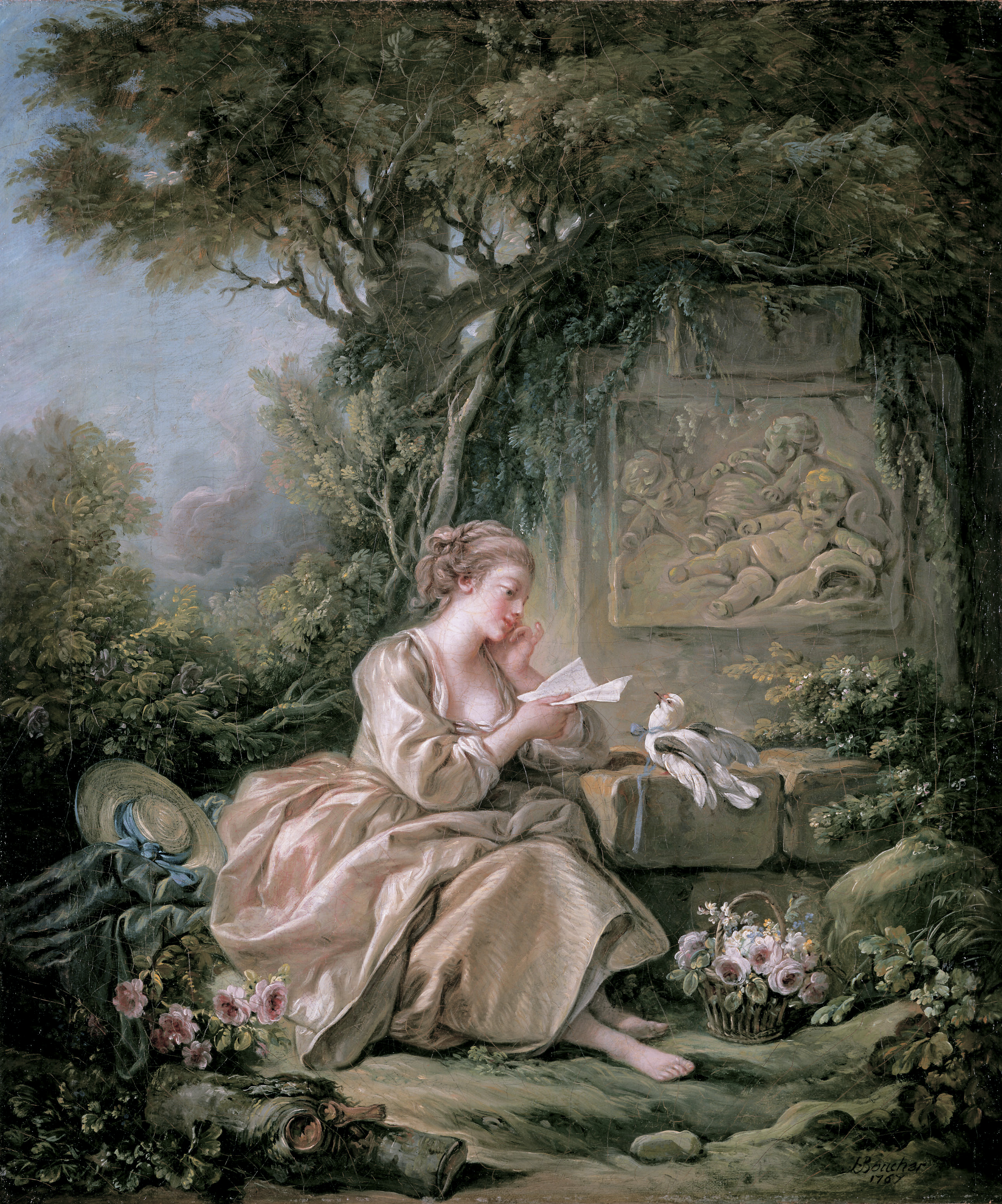
The Secret Message, 1767 (Herzog Anton Ulrich Museum, Braunschweig)

Boucher took inspiration from artists such as Peter Paul Rubens and Antoine Watteau. Boucher's early works celebrate the idyllic and tranquil portrayal of nature and landscape with great elan. However, his art typically forgoes traditional rural innocence to portray scenes with a definitive style of eroticism as his mythological scenes are passionate and intimately amorous rather than traditionally epic. Boucher's paintings of a flirtatious shepherd and shepherdess in a woodland setting, featured in The Enjoyable Lesson (The Flute Players) of 1748 and An Autumn Pastoral (The Grape Eaters) of 1749, were based upon characters in a 1745 play by Boucher's close friend Charles-Simon Favart. Boucher's characters in those paintings later inspired a pair of figurines created by the Sèvres Porcelain Manufactory, c. 1757–66. Marquise de Pompadour (mistress of King Louis XV), whose name became synonymous with Rococo art, was a great admirer of his work. Marquise de Pompadour is often referred to as the "godmother of Rococo" and Boucher's portraits were central to her self-presentation and cultivation of her image. For instance, Boucher's 'Sketch for a Portrait of Madame de Pompadour', displayed in the Starhemburg room at Waddesdon Manor, acts as a surviving example of the oil preparation prior to the, now lost, portrait. In one hand she holds her hat, in the other she picks up a pearl bracelet with a portrait of the king – symbolising the relationship upon which her status depends.

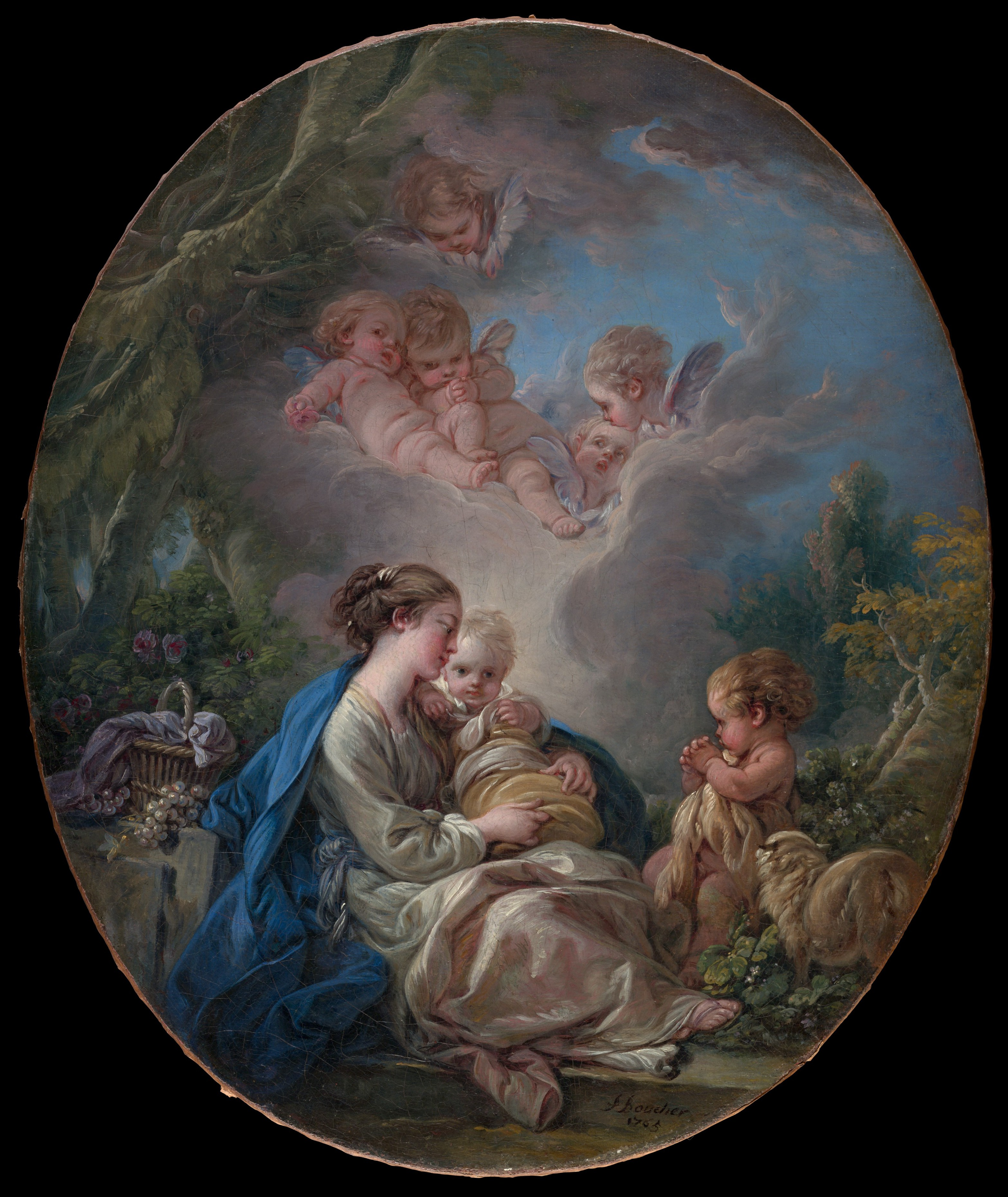
Virgin and Child with the Young Saint John the Baptist and Angels, 1765 (Metropolitan Museum of Art)

Boucher's paintings such as The Breakfast (1739), a familial scene, show how he was as a master of the genre scene, where he regularly used his own wife and children as models. These intimate family scenes are contrasting to the licentious style seen in his Odalisque portraits.

The dark-haired version of the Odalisque portraits prompted claims by the art critic Denis Diderot that Boucher was "prostituting his own wife", and the Blonde Odalisque was a portrait that illustrated the extramarital relationships of the King. Boucher gained lasting notoriety through such private commissions for wealthy collectors and, after Diderot expressed his disapproval, his reputation came under increasing critical attack during the last years of his career.

== Theatrical and tapestry designs ==
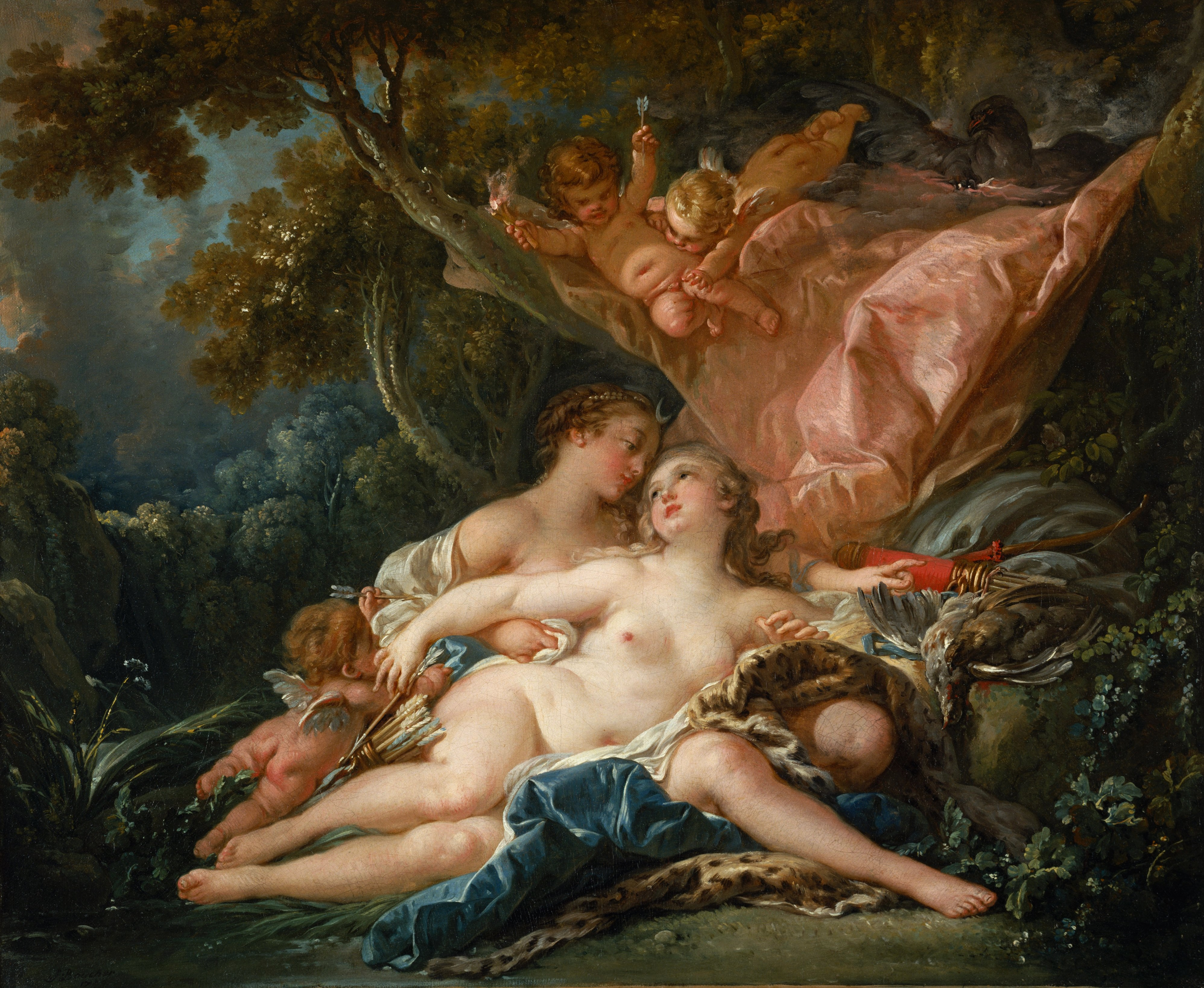
Jupiter and Callisto, 1759 (Nelson-Atkins Museum of Art, Kansas City)

Along with his painting, Boucher also designed theater costumes and sets, and the ardent intrigues of the comic operas of Charles Simon Favart closely paralleled his own style of painting. Tapestry design was also a concern. For the Beauvais tapestry workshops he first designed a series of Fêtes italiennes ("Italian festivals") in 1736, which proved to be very successful and often rewoven over the years, and then, commissioned in 1737, a suite of the story of Cupid and Psyche. During two decades' involvement with the Beauvais tapestry workshops Boucher produced designs for six series of hangings in all, like the tapestry showing Psyche and the Basketmaker from 1741 to 1742.

Boucher was also called upon for designs for court festivities organized by that section of the King's household called the Menus-Plaisirs du Roi and for the opera and for royal châteaux Versailles, Fontainebleau and Choisy. His designs for all of the aforementioned augmented his earlier reputation, resulting in many engravings from his work and even reproduction of his designs on porcelain and biscuit-ware at the Vincennes and Sèvres factories. The death of Oudry in 1755 put an end to its contribution to Beauvais but his collaboration with the Gobelins lasted until 1765, when he stepped down from his position as an inspector.

== Drawings and prints ==
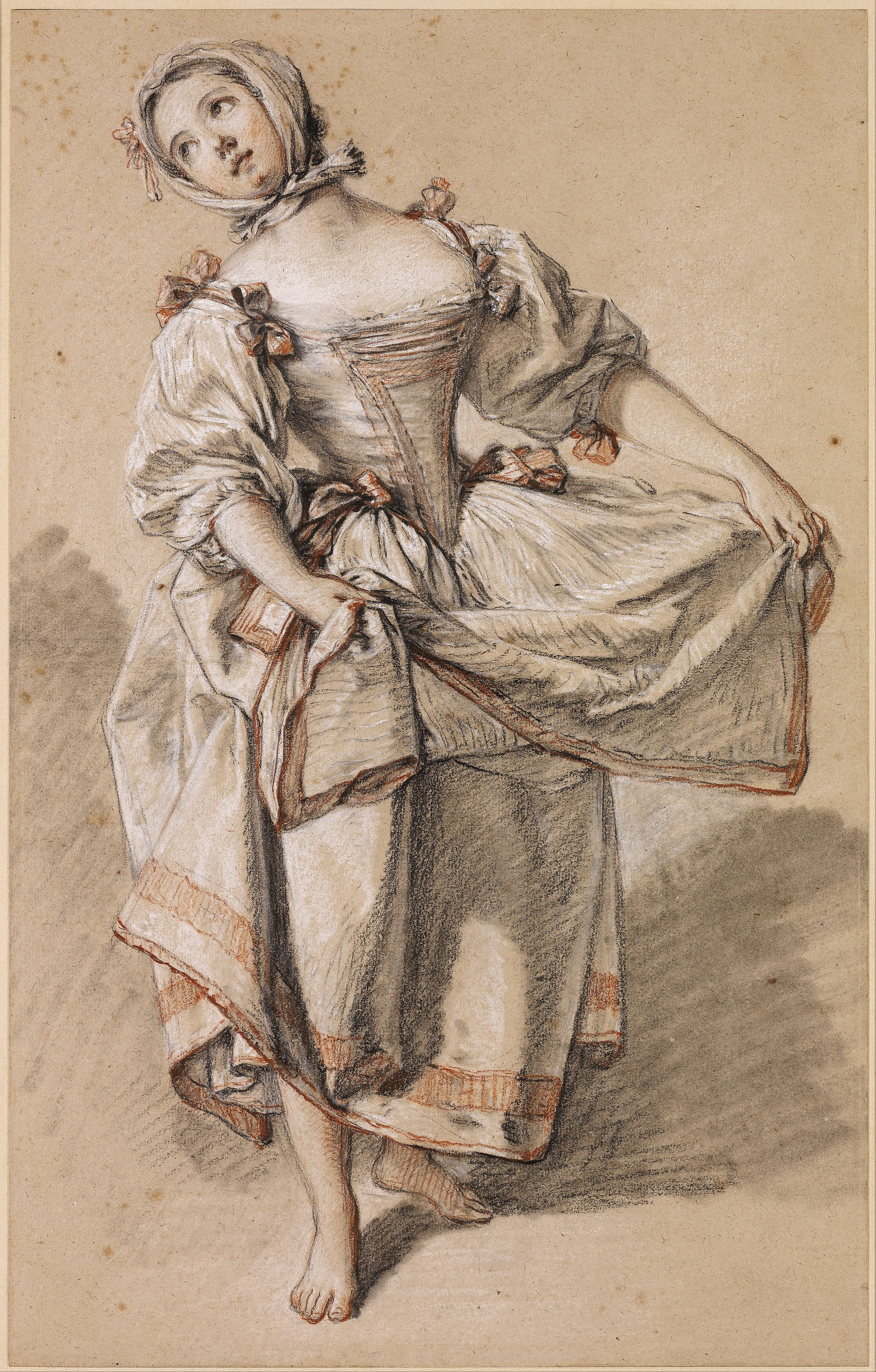
Young Country Girl Dancing, black, red and white chalk and stump on paper

Boucher was a prolific and varied draftsman. His drawings served not only as preparatory studies for his paintings and as designs for printmakers but also as finished works of art for which there was a great demand by collectors. Boucher followed standard studio practices of the time, by first working out the overall composition of his major canvases, and then making chalk studies for individual figures, or groups of figures. He also relied on oil and gouache sketches in the preparation of major commissions.

Gradually he made more and more sketches as independent works for the market. The Adoration of the Shepherds (Metropolitan Museum of Art), a free and painterly sketch in gouache, was long considered a preparatory sketch for Madame de Pompadour's private altarpiece La lumière du monde (ca. 1750, Musée des Beaux-Arts, Lyon). Recent scholarship suggests, however, that it was made at least 10 years later as an autonomous work. In the last decade of his career the artist began to favor brown chalk, a fabricated medium.

Boucher was also a gifted engraver and etcher. Boucher etched some 180 original copperplates. He made many etchings after Watteau. He thus helped propagate a taste for reproductions of drawings. When his own drawings began to sell, 266 of them were etched in stipple substitutes by Gilles Demarteau. These were printed in red ink so they resembled red chalk drawings which could be framed as little pictures. They could then be hung in the small blank spaces of the elaborately decorated paneling of luxury dwellings.

Boucher's most original inventions were decorative, and he contributed to the fashionable style of chinoiserie, after having etched 12 'Figures Chinoises' (Chinese figures) by Watteau.

== Gallery ==
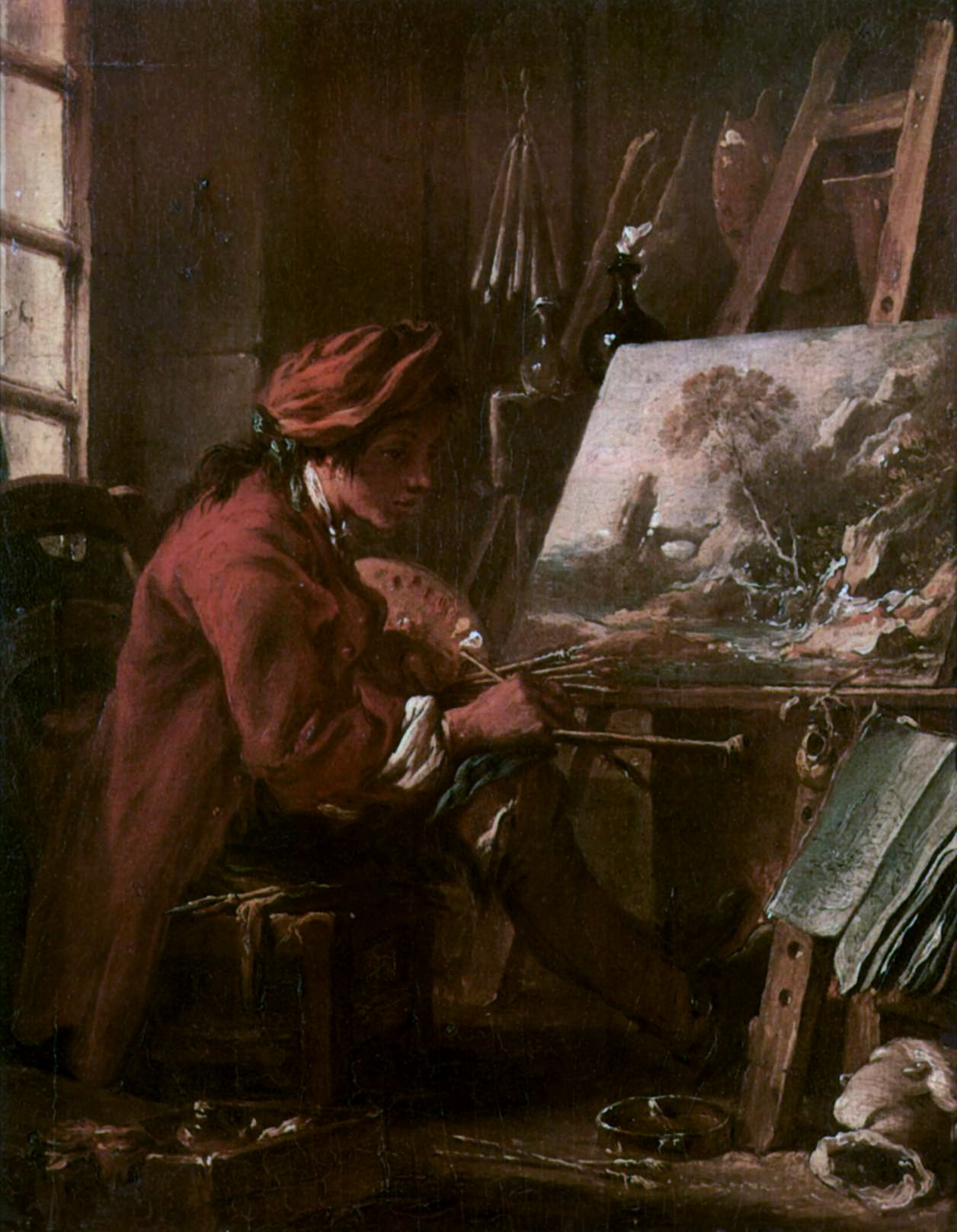
Self-portrait in the Studio, 1720, Louvre

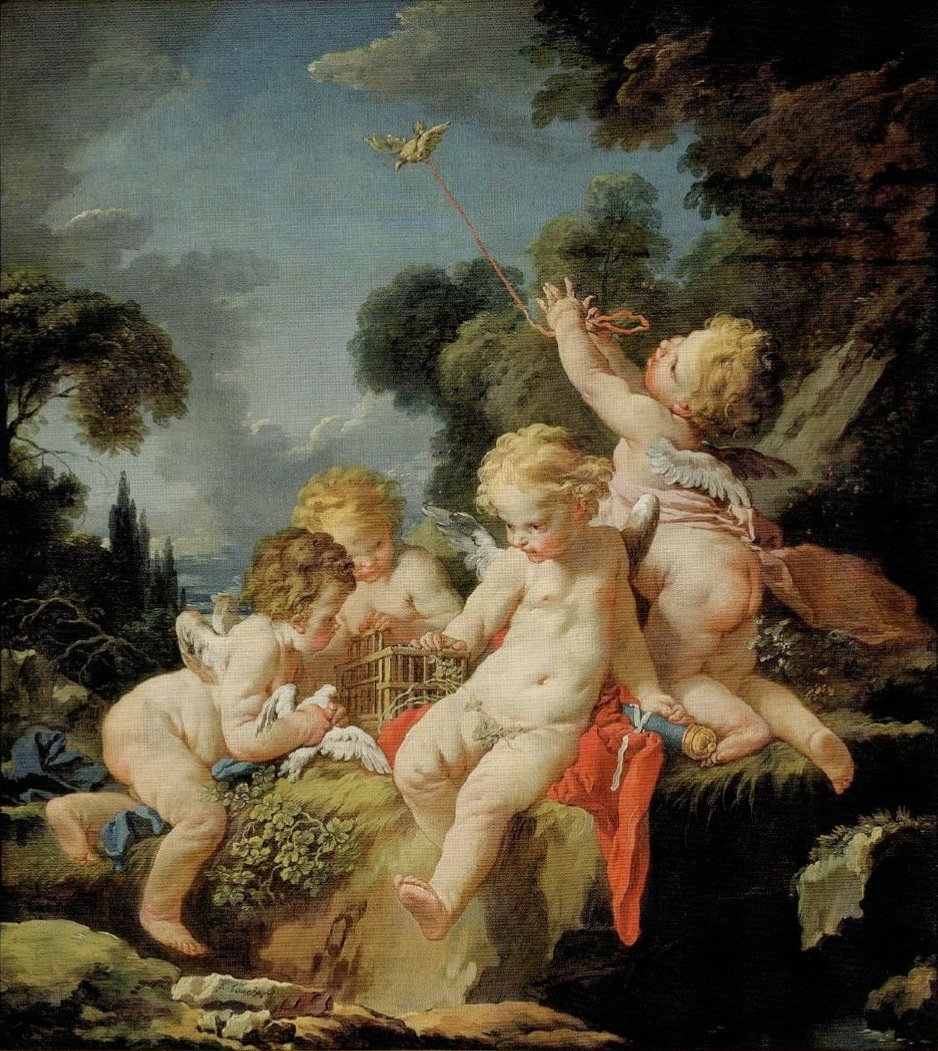
Putti with Birds, 1730–1733, Honolulu Museum of Art

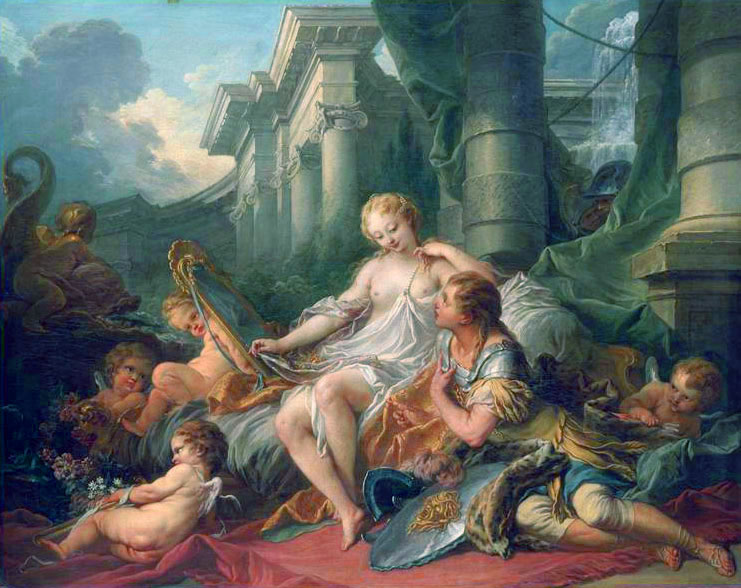
Rinaldo and Armida, 1734 (Reception piece), Louvre

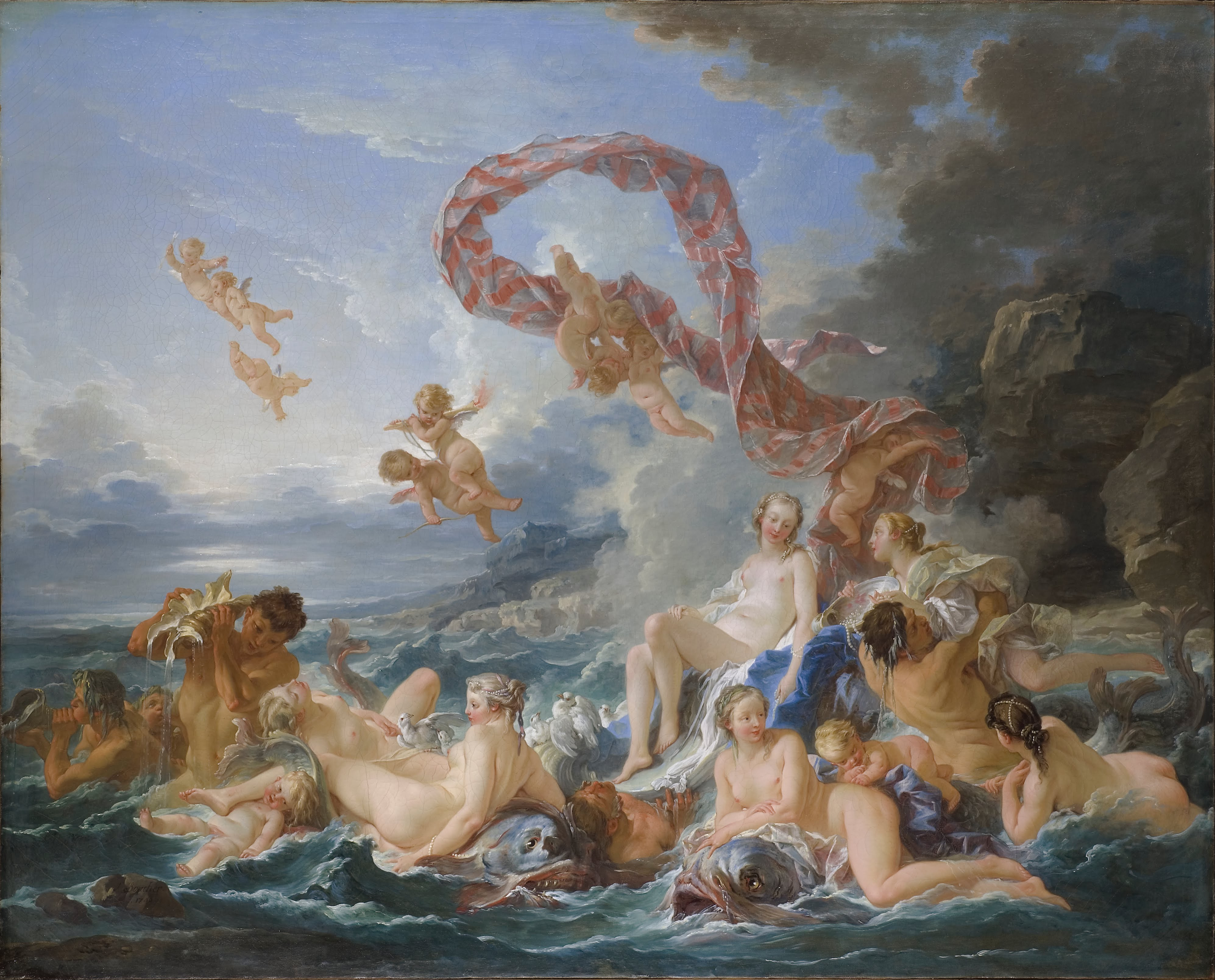
The Triumph of Venus, 1740, Nationalmuseum Stockholm

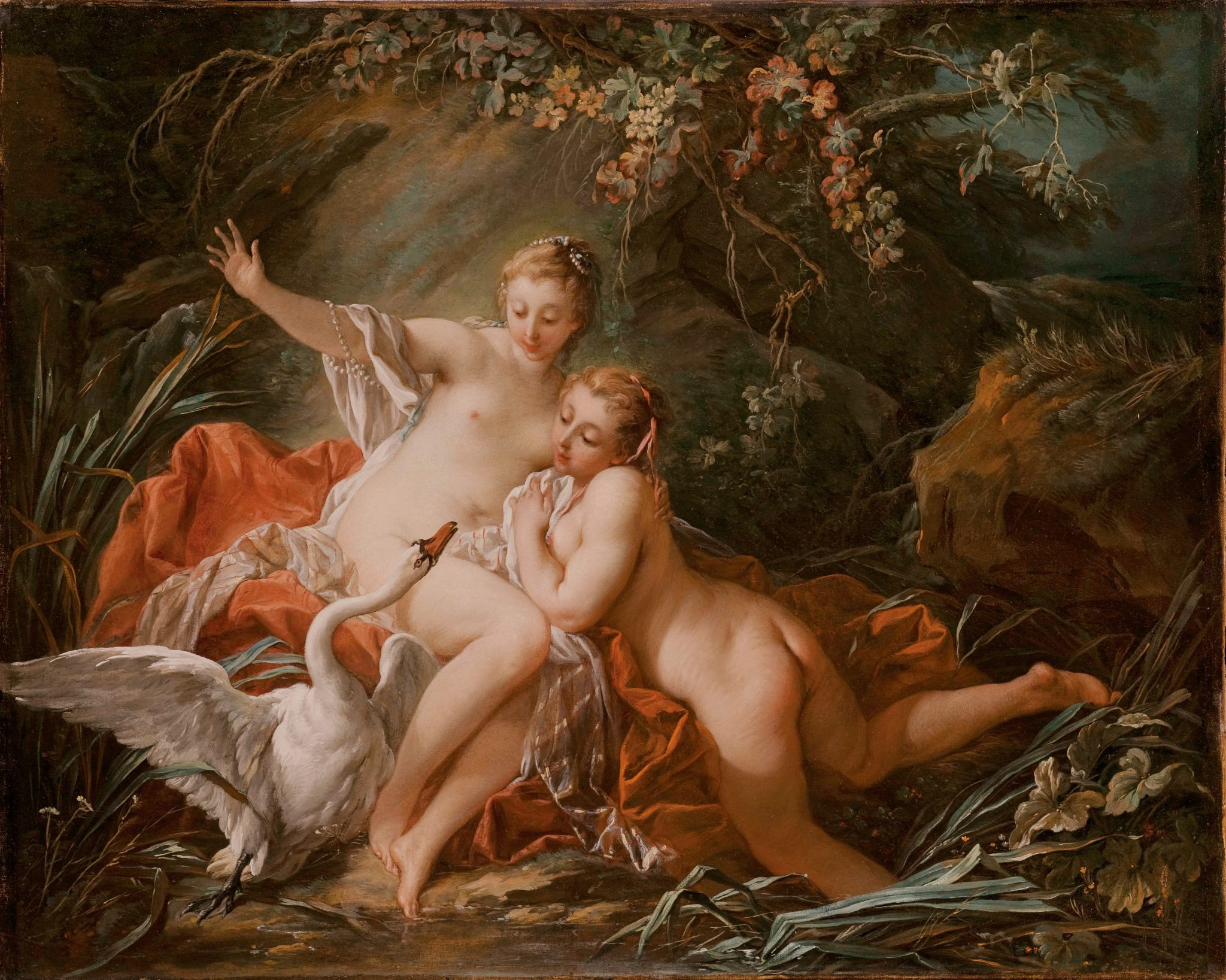
Leda and the Swan, 1741, Los Angeles County Museum of Art

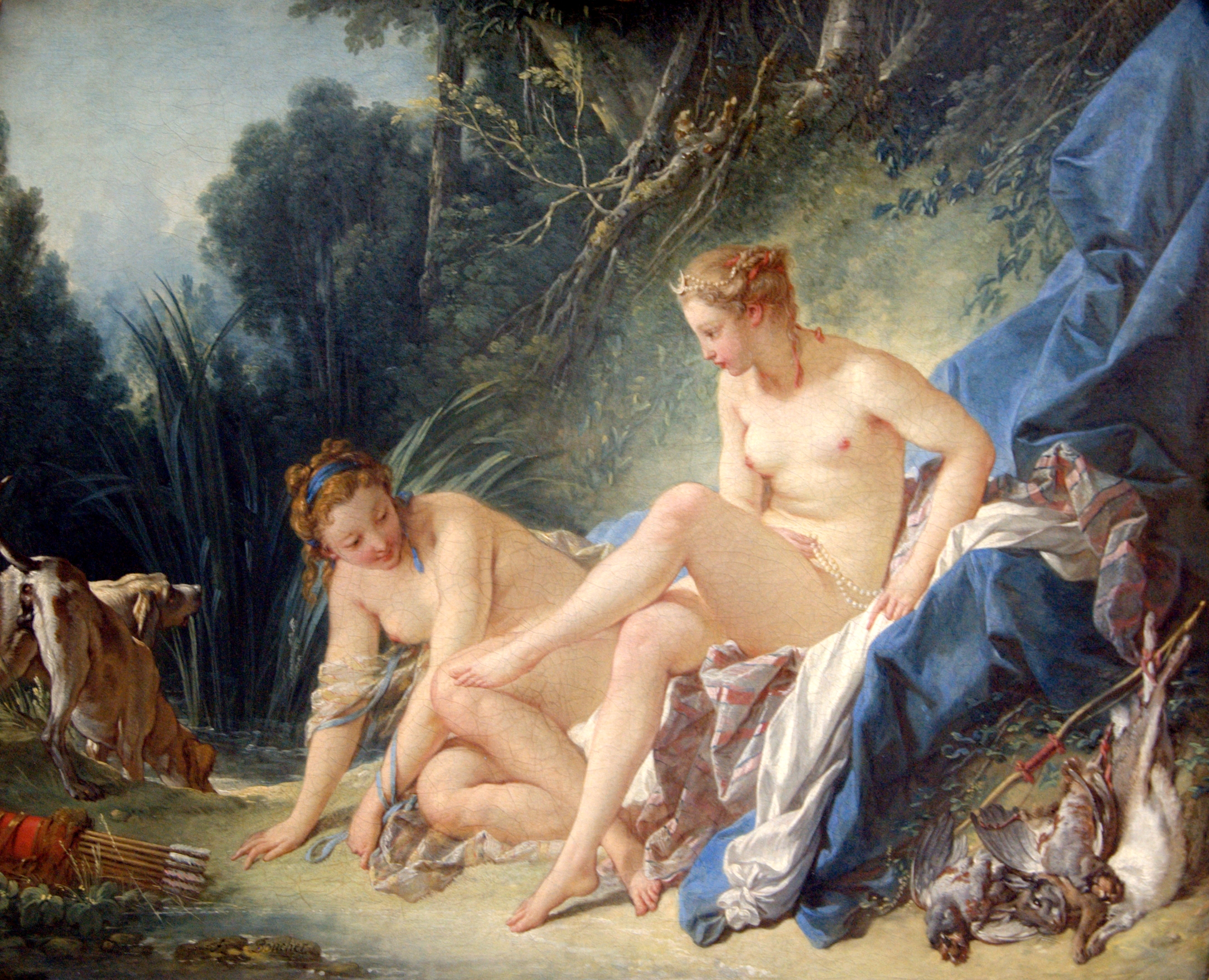
Diana Leaving the Bath, 1742, Louvre

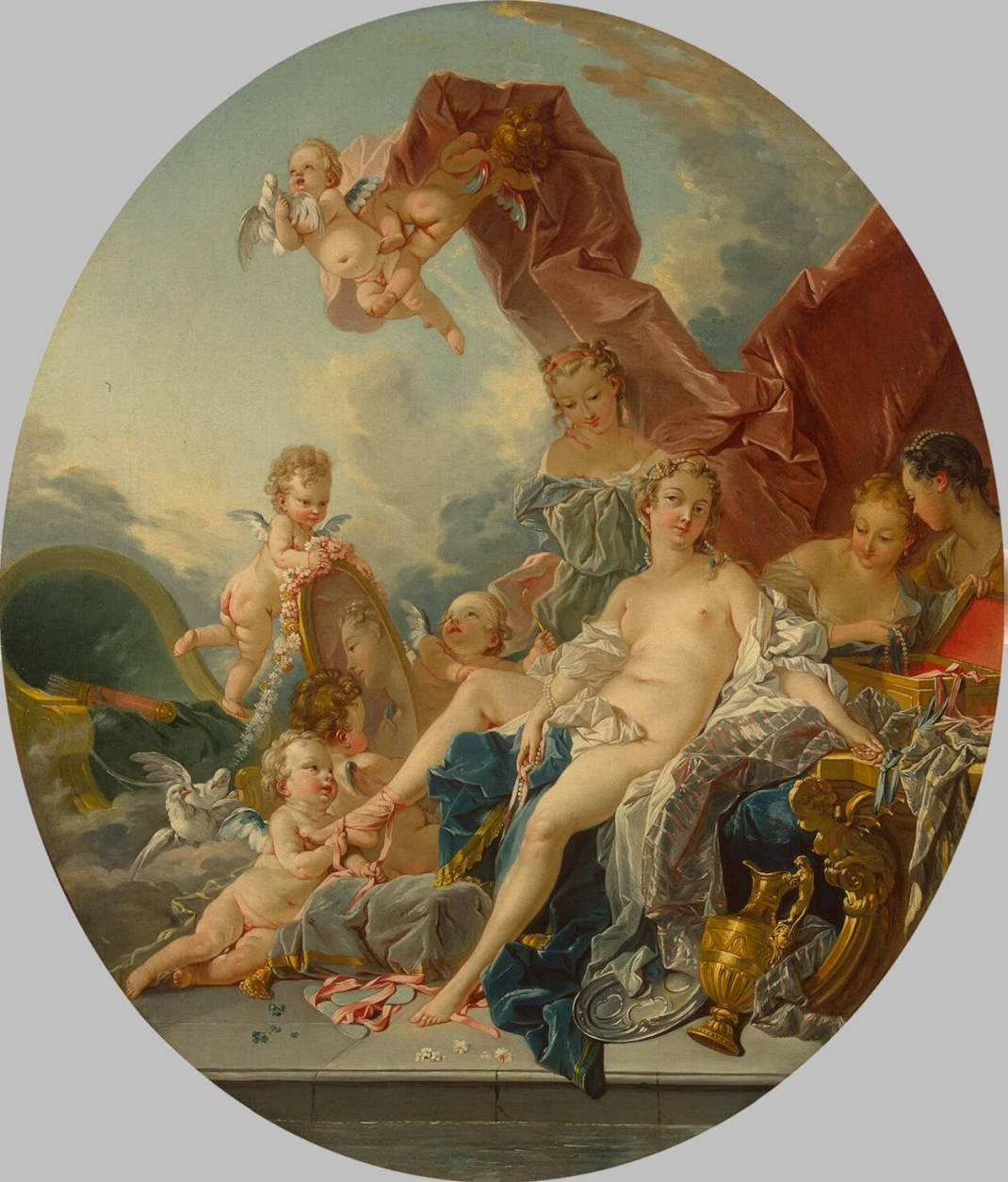
La Toilette de Venus, after 1743, Hermitage Museum

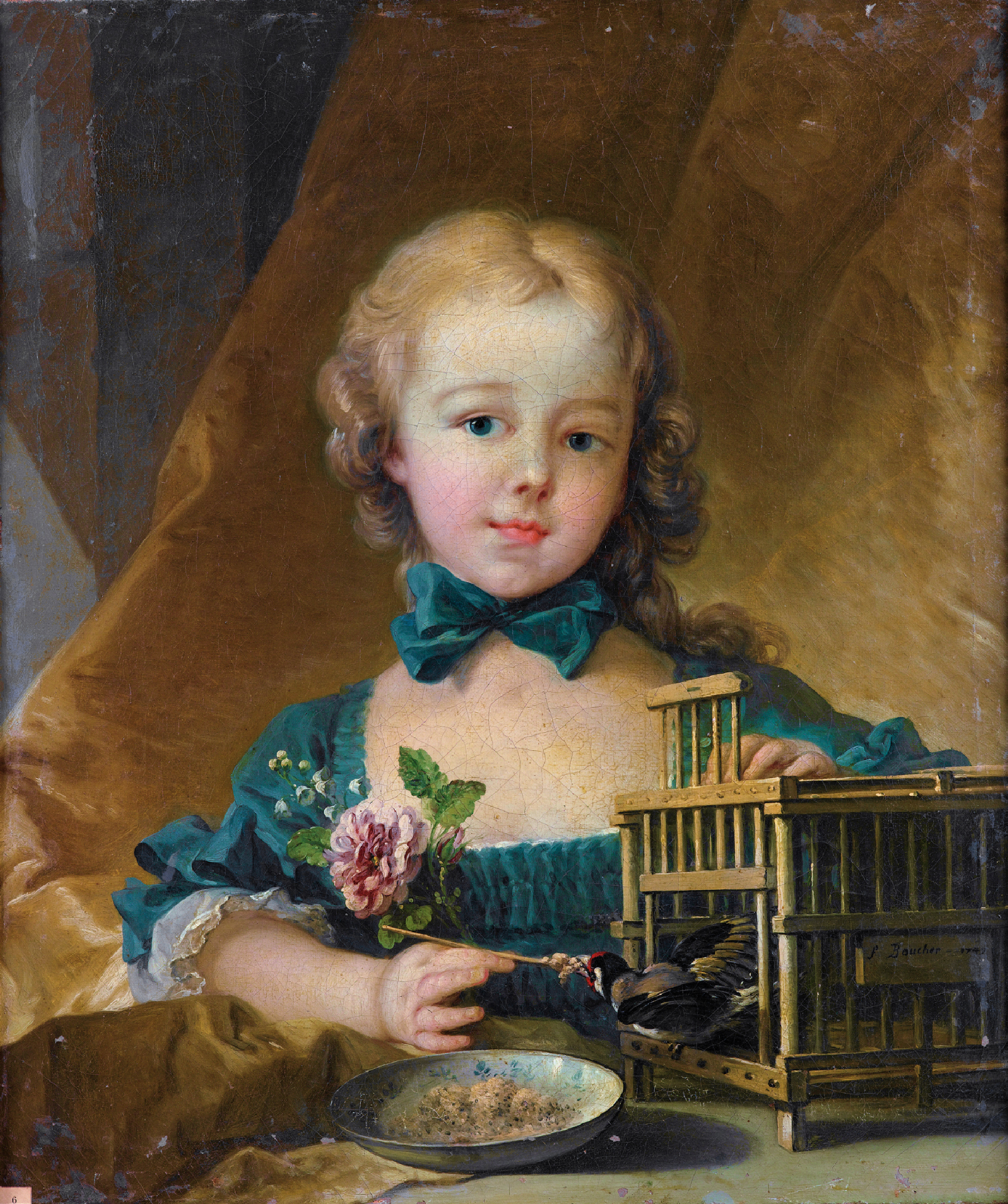
Portrait of Alexandrine Le Normant d'Étiolles, playing with a Goldfinch 1749, Château de Versailles

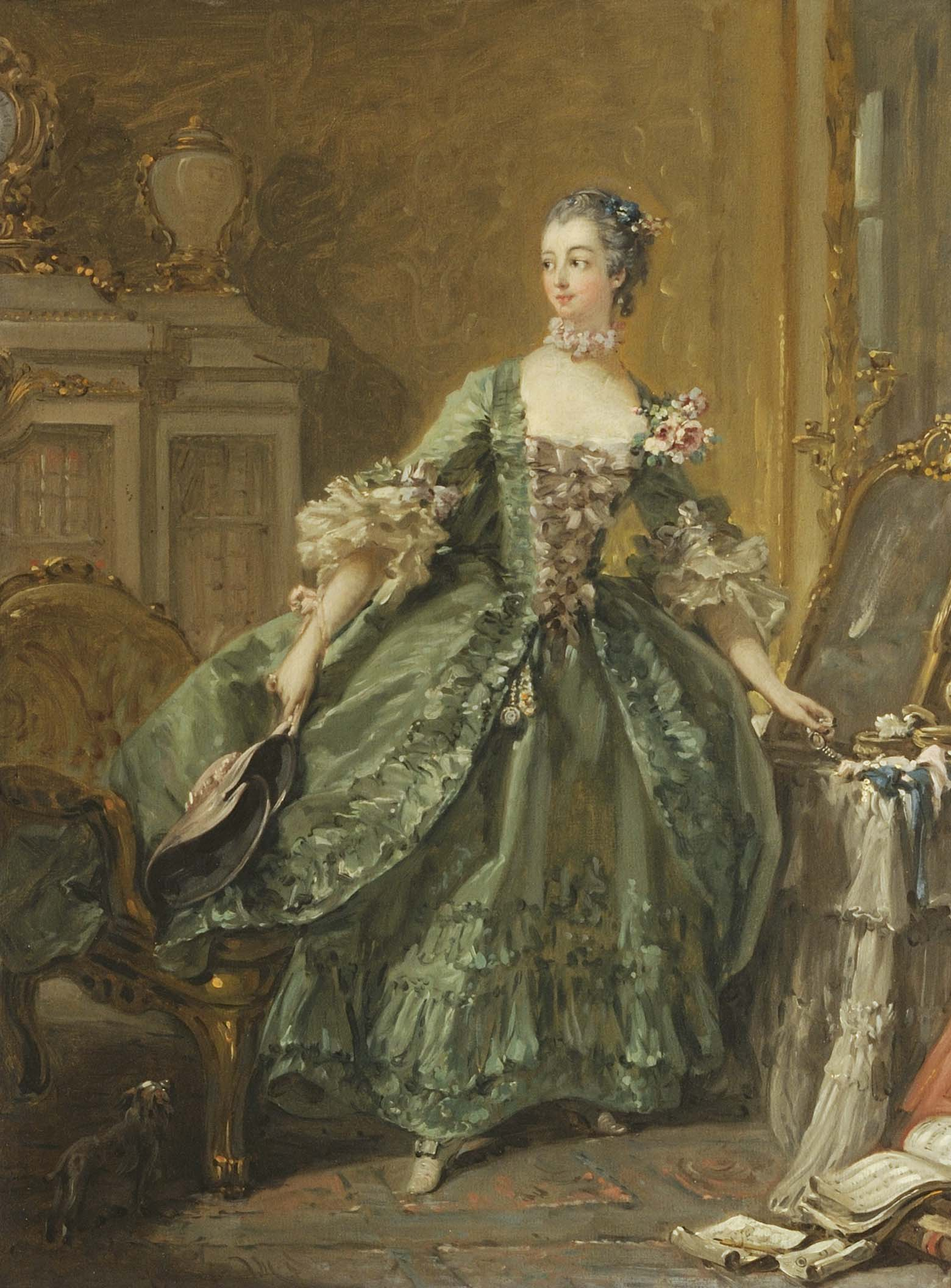
Sketch for a Portrait of Madame de Pompadour, 1750, Waddesdon Manor

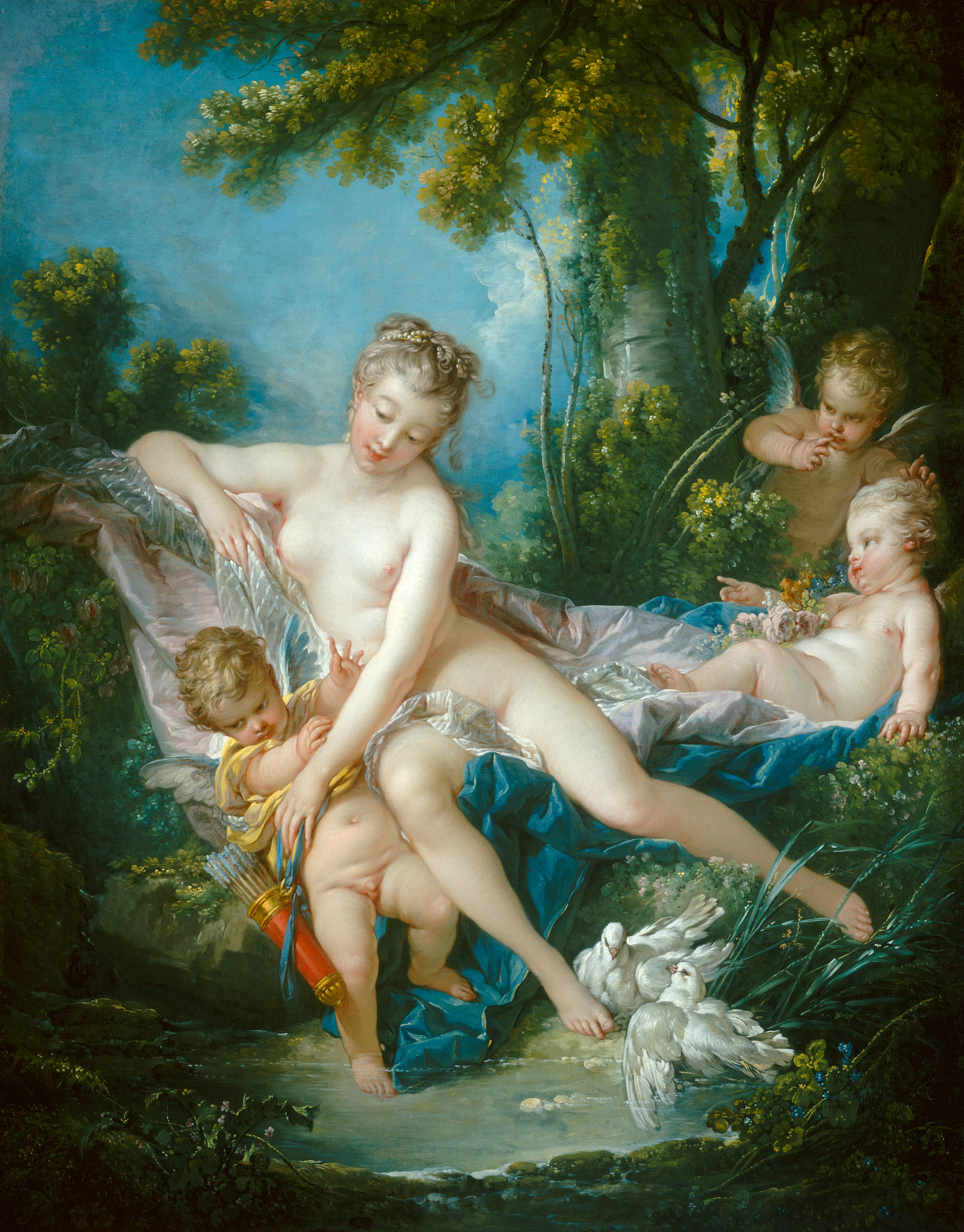
Venus Consoling Love, 1751, National Gallery of Art

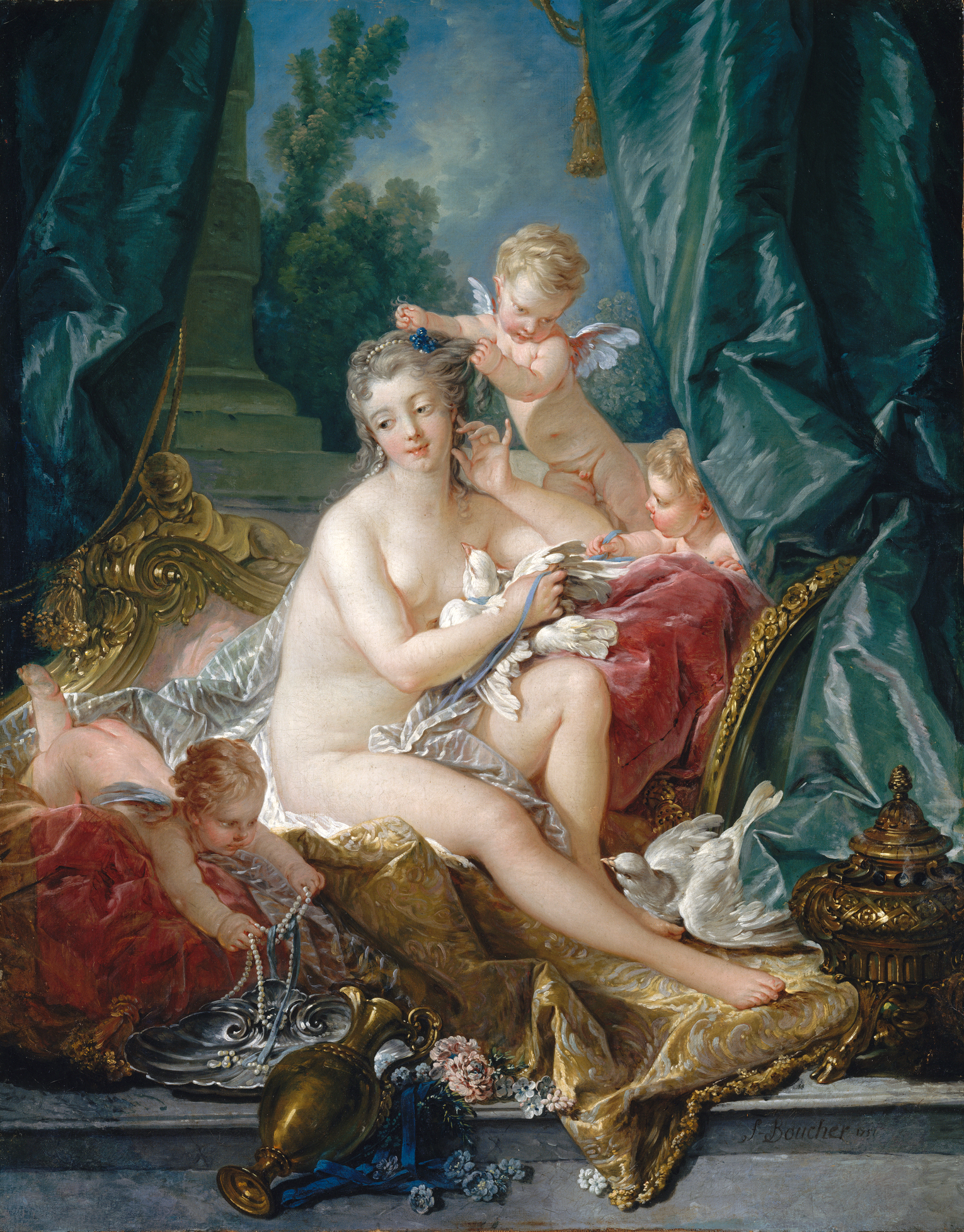
The Toilette of Venus (1751) Metropolitan Museum of Art

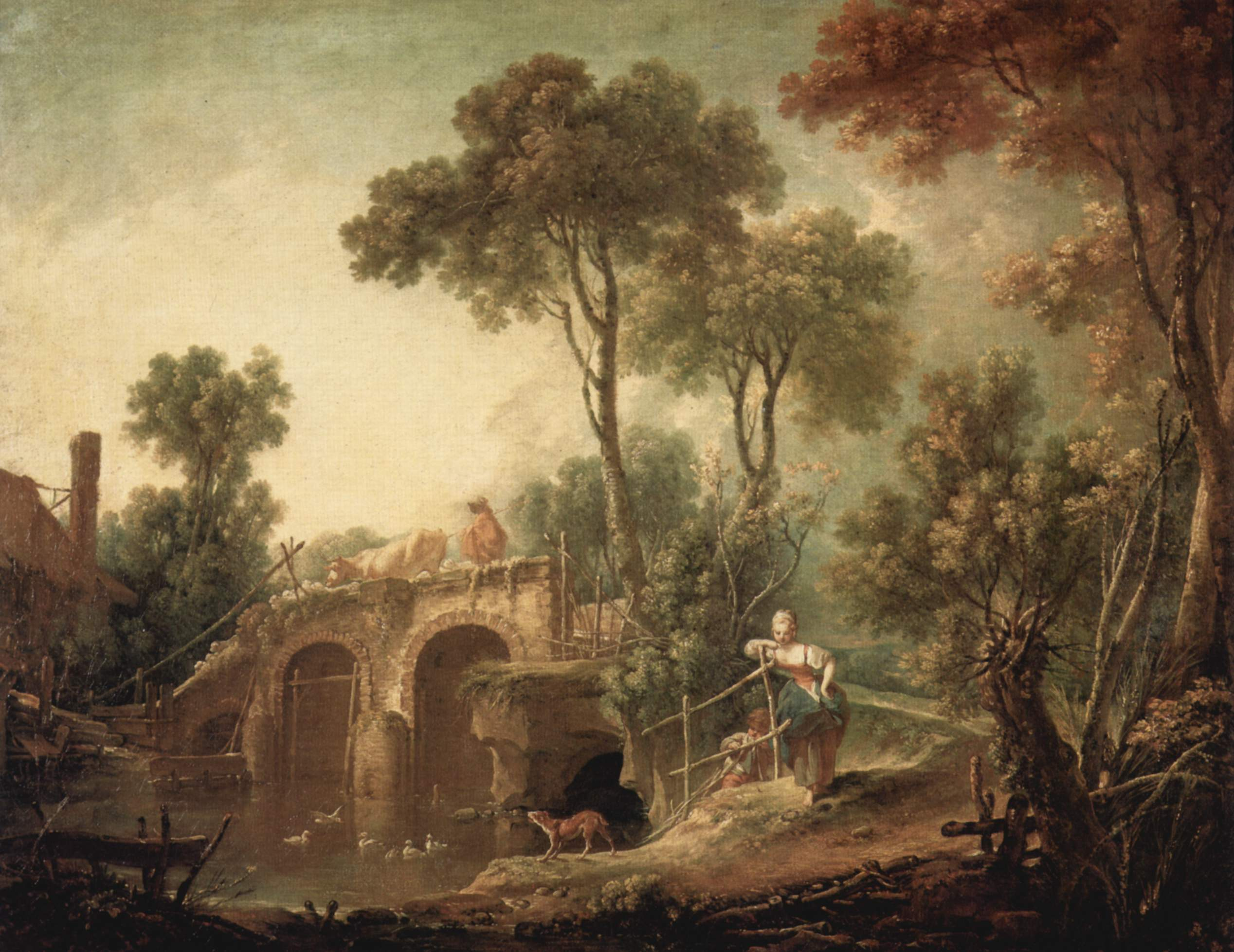
The Bridge, 1751, Louvre Museum

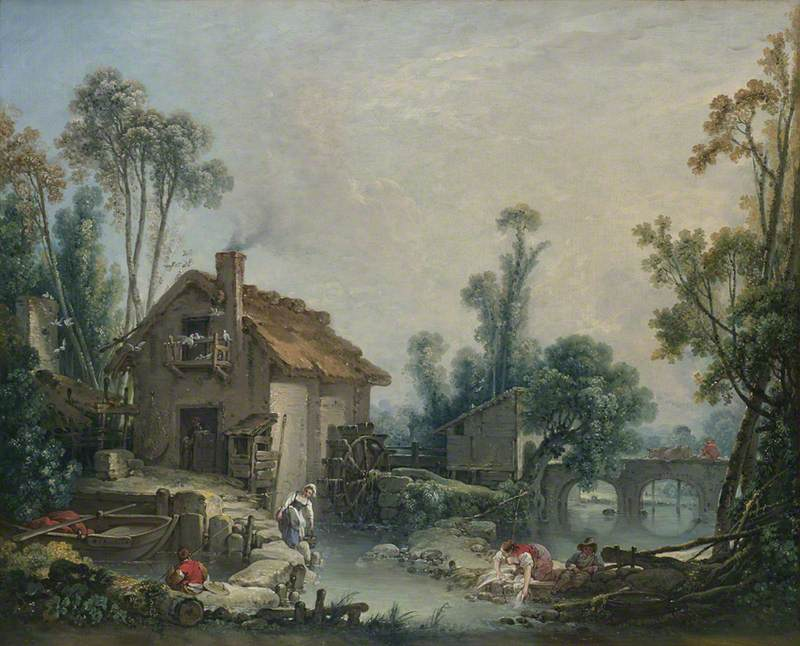
Landscape with a Watermill, 1755,, National Gallery

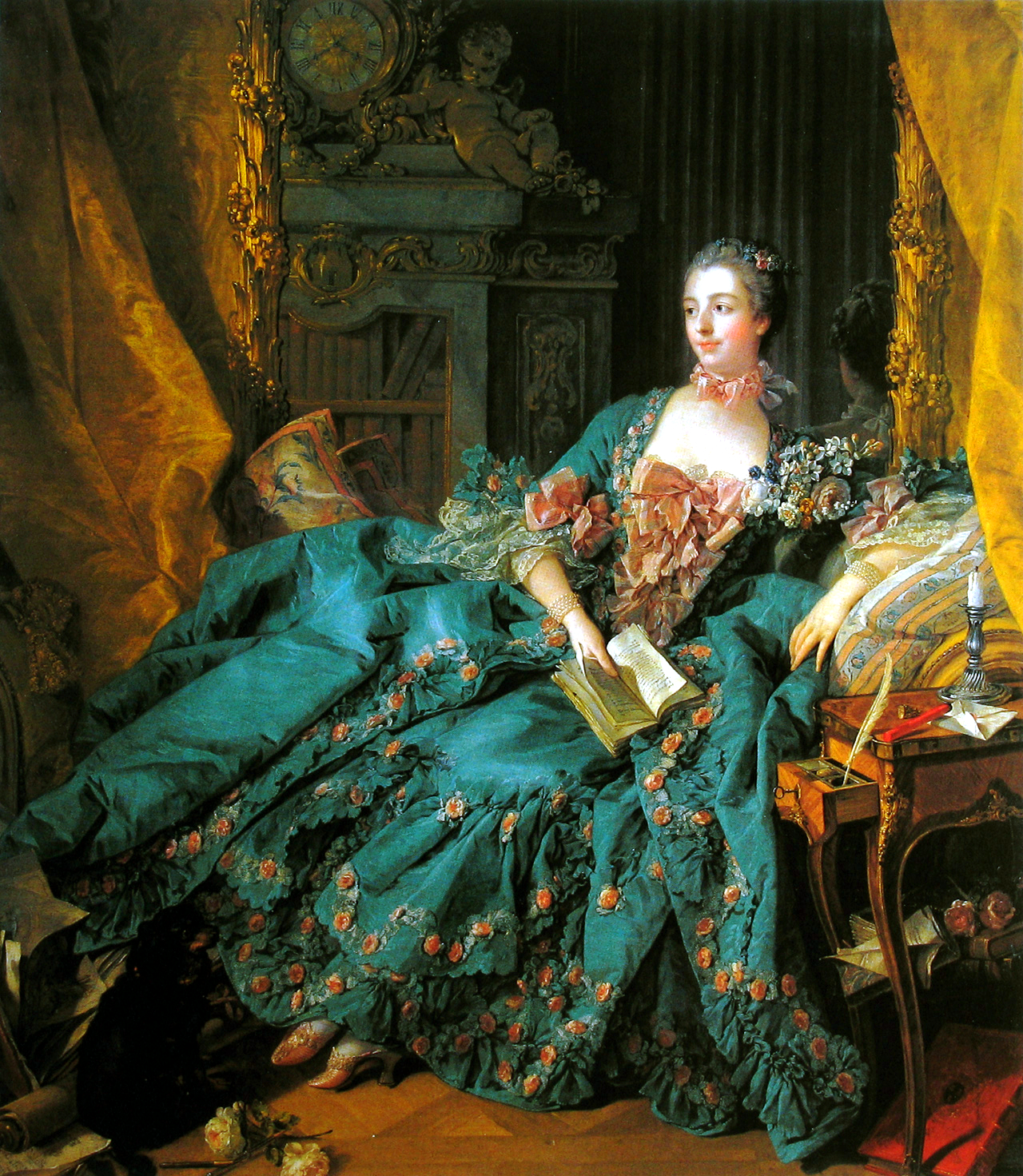
Madame de Pompadour, 1756, Alte Pinakothek

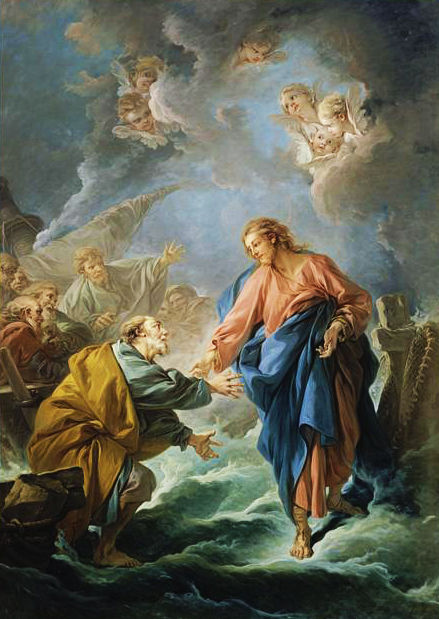
Saint Peter Attempting to Walk on Water, 1766, Cathédrale Saint-Louis, Versailles

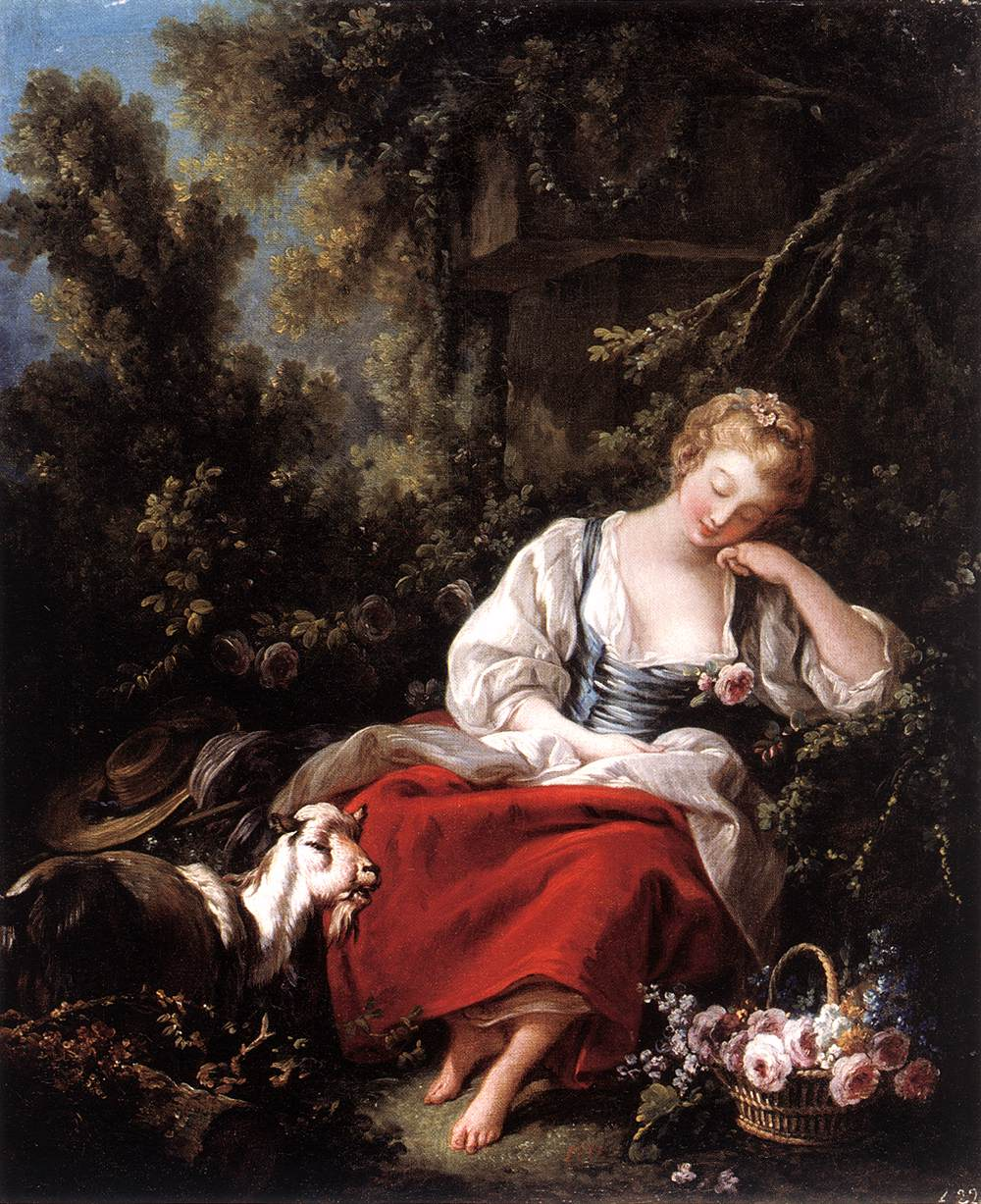
Dreaming Shepherdess, 1763, Residenzgalerie

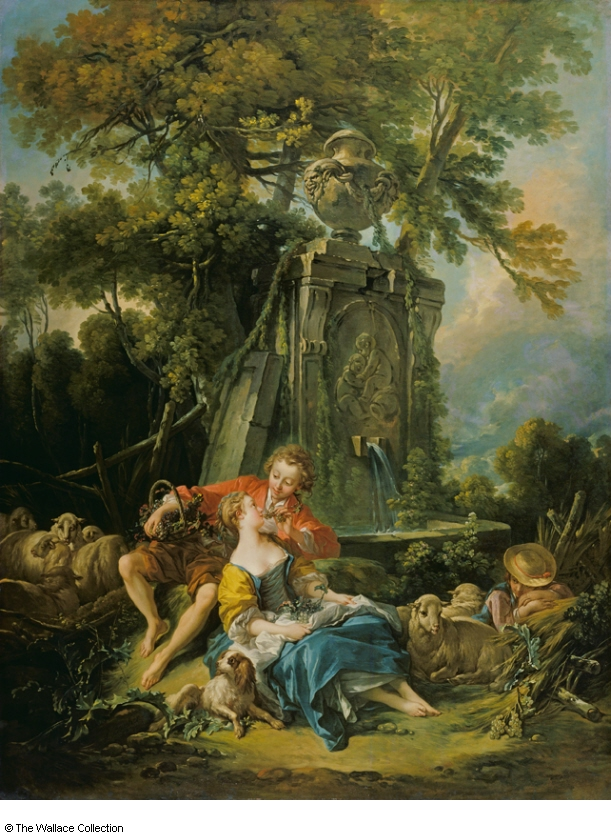
Pastoral with a Couple near a Fountain, 1749, Wallace Collection

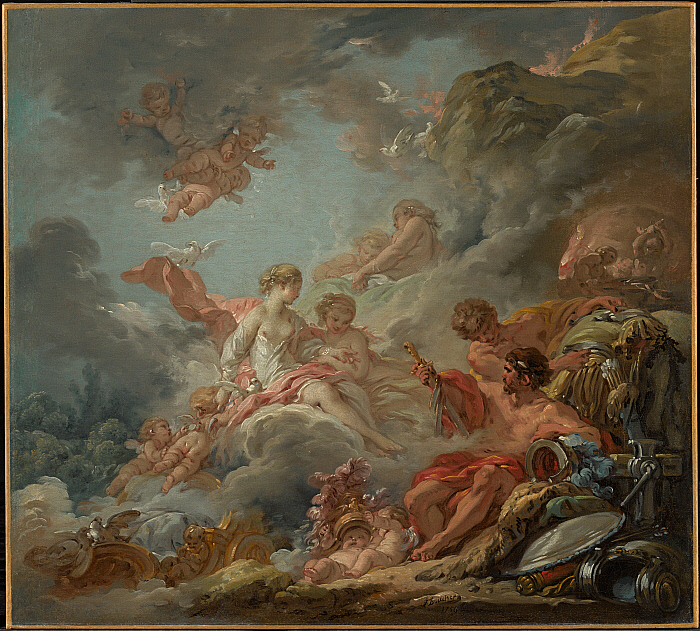
Vulcan Presenting Arms to Venus for Aeneas (1756), Oil on canvas, 16 1/4 x 17 13/16 in. (41.2 x 45.3 cm), Clark Art Institute

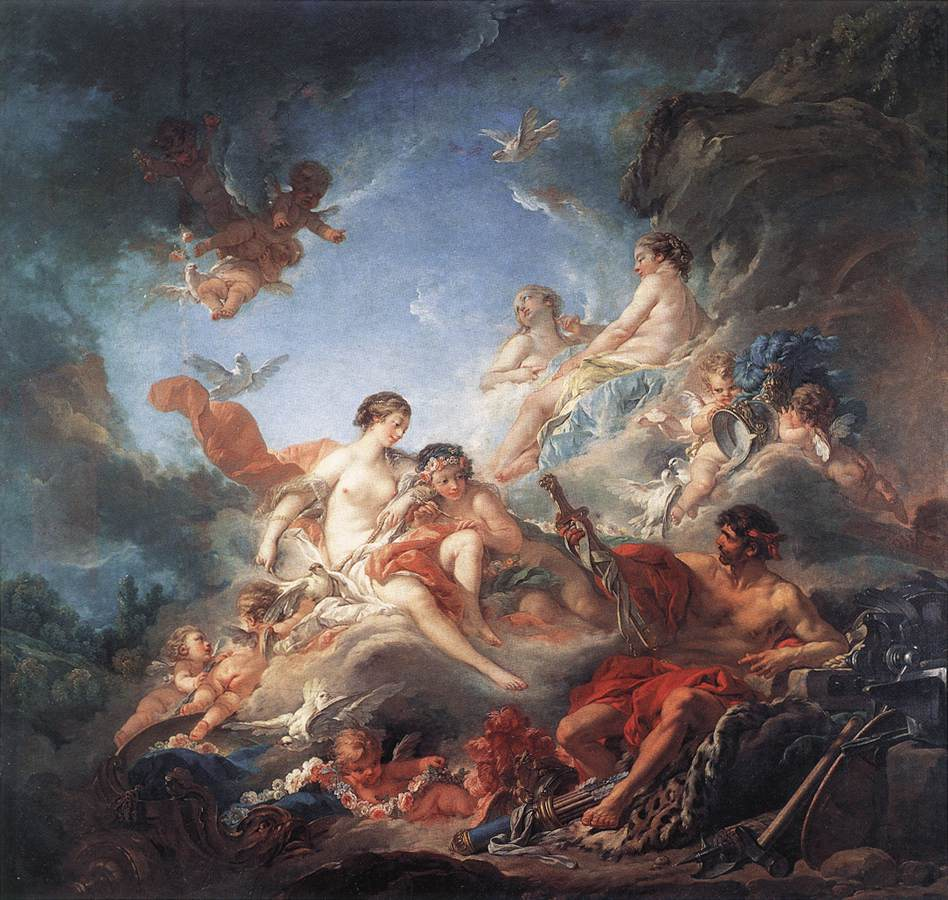
Vulcan Presenting Venus with Arms for Aeneas, 1757, Pushkin Museum

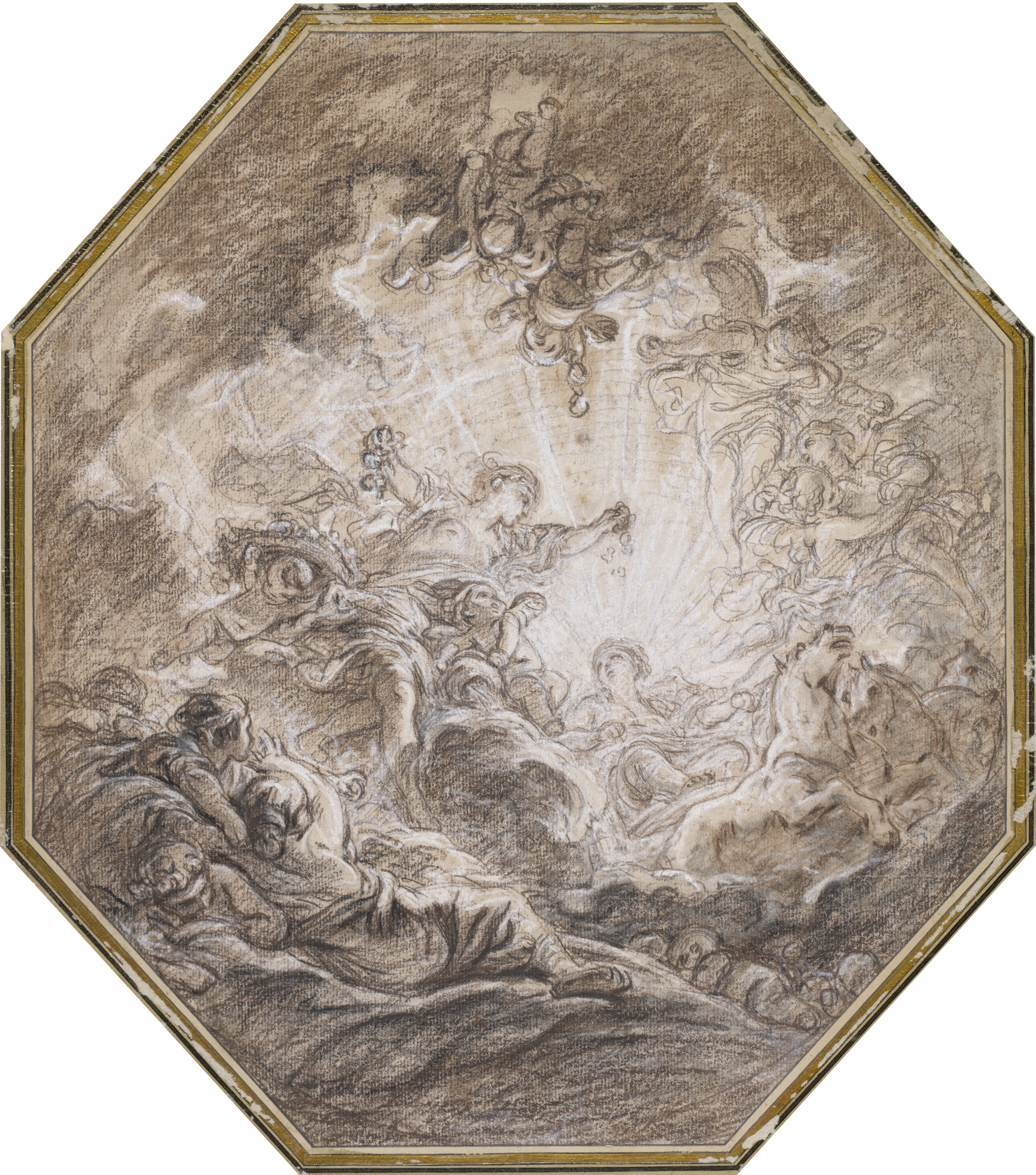
Aurora Heralding the Arrival of the Morning Sun, 1765, National Gallery of Art

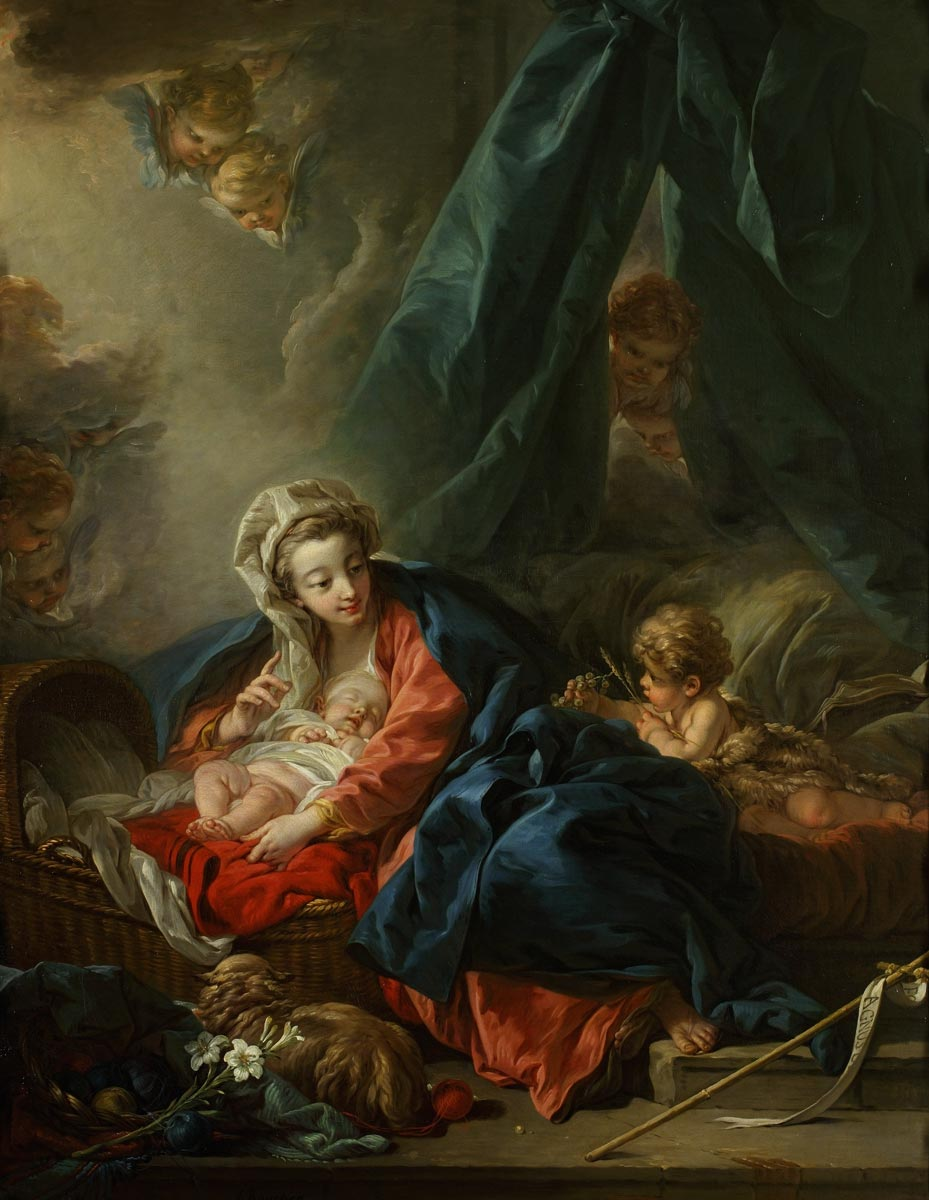
Madonna and Child with the Infant John the Baptist, 18th-century, Pushkin Museum

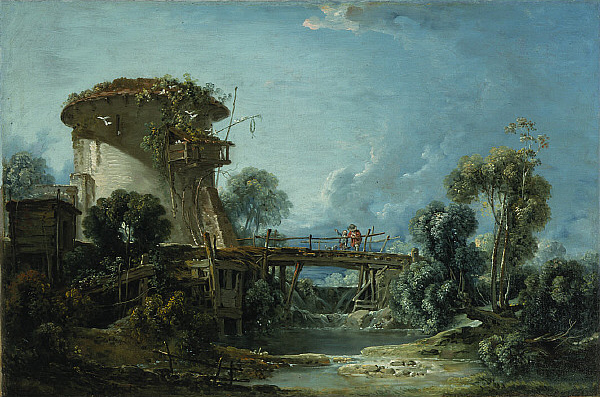
The Dovecote, 1758, Saint Louis Art Museum

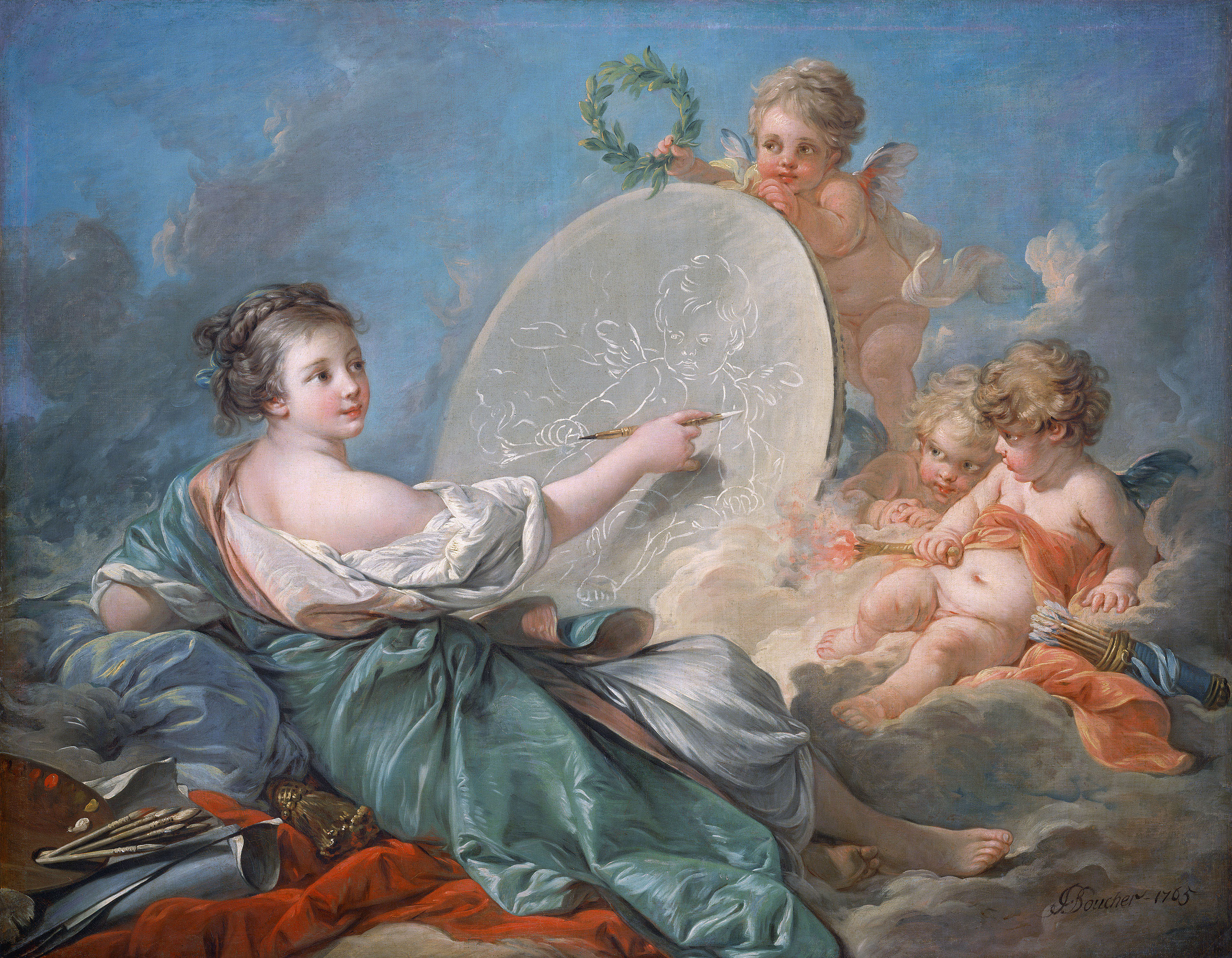
Allegory of Painting, 1765, National Gallery of Art

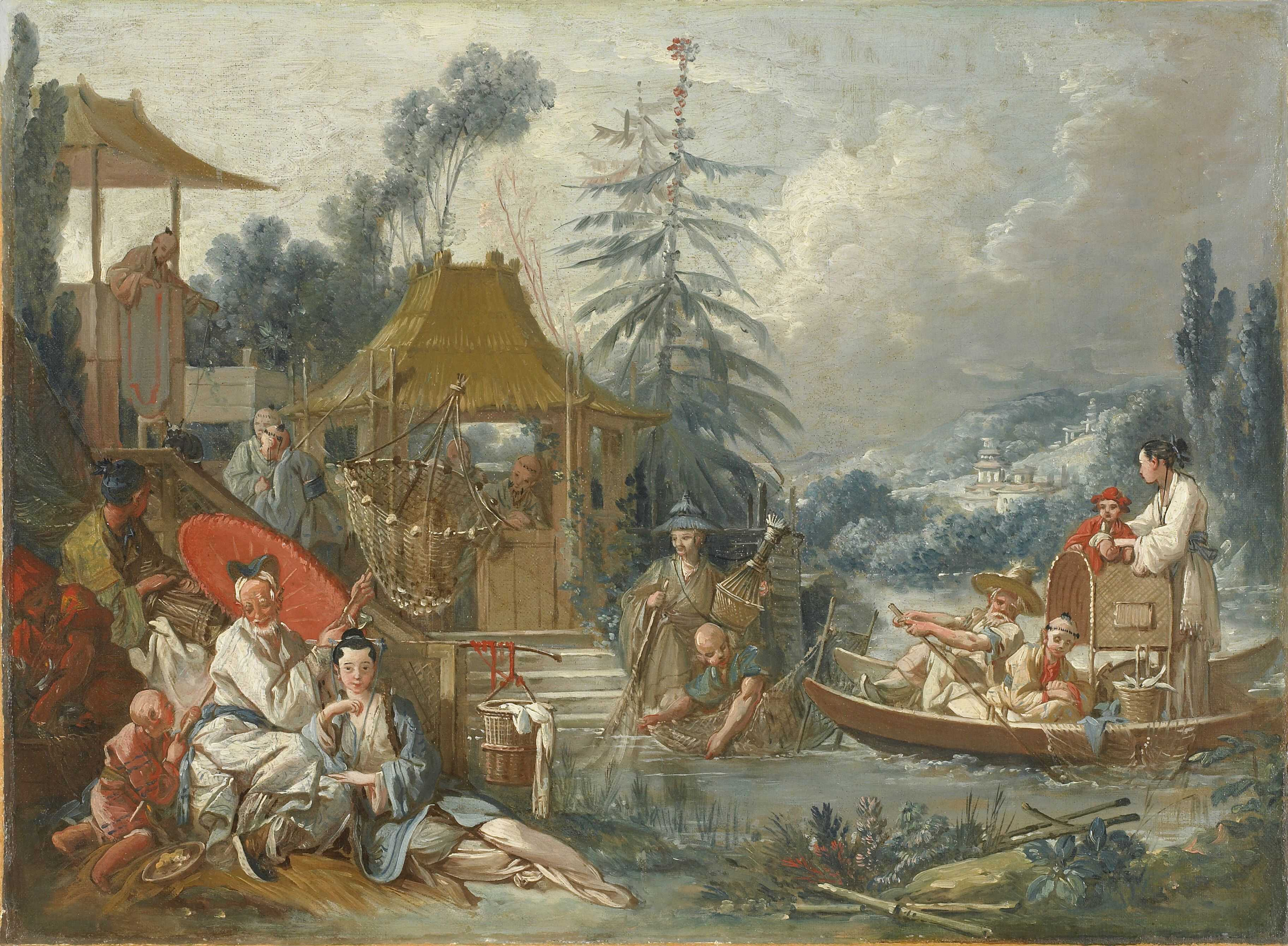
La Pêche chinoise, Chinese Fishing, 1742, Museum of Fine Arts and Archeology of Besançon

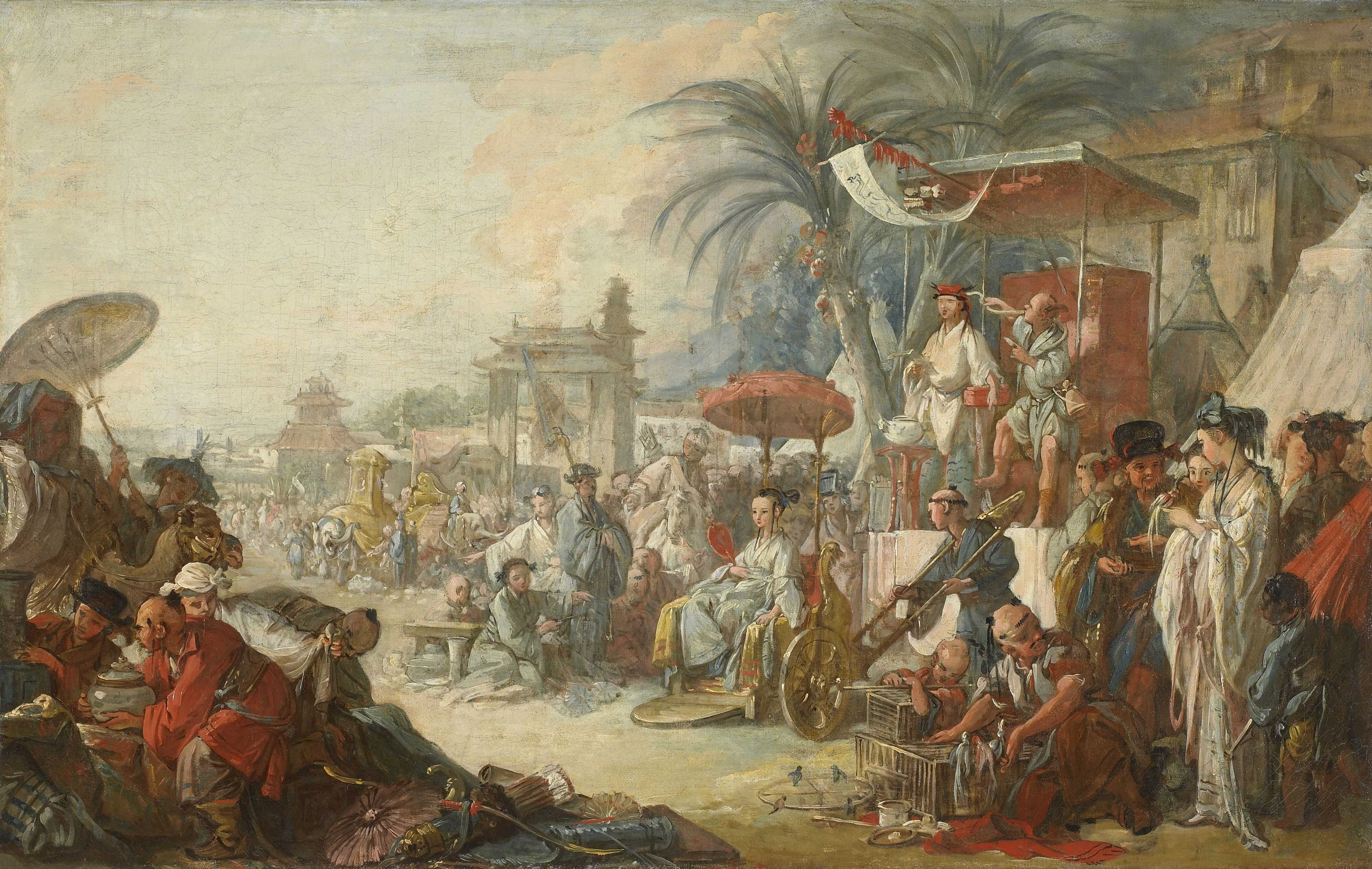
La Foire chinoise, 1742, Museum of Fine Arts and Archeology of Besançon

== Works by François Boucher ==
This is an incomplete list of works by François Boucher.

- Death of Meleager (c. 1727), Los Angeles County Museum of Art
- Project for a Cartouche (c. 1727), Los Angeles County Museum of Art
- The Birth of Adonis and The Death of Adonis (c. 1730), Museo del Prado, Madrid
- The Rape of Europa (c. 1732 – c. 1734), Wallace Collection, London
- Imaginary Landscape with the Palatine Hill from Campo Vaccino (1734), Metropolitan Museum of Art, New York
- Monument to Mignard (c. 1735), Los Angeles County Museum of Art
- Venus and Mercury Instructing Cupid (1738), Los Angeles County Museum of Art
- Cupid Wounding Psyche (1741), Los Angeles County Museum of Art
- Daphnis and Chloe (1743), Wallace Collection, London
- Erigone Conquered (Erigone vaincue) (1745), Wallace Collection, London
- Les Confidences Pastorales (c. 1745), Los Angeles County Museum of Art
- Shepherd Piping to a Shepherdess (c. 1747 – c. 1750), Wallace Collection, London
- Arion on the Dolphin (1748), Princeton University Art Museum
- Pastoral with a Bagpipe Player (1749), Wallace Collection, London
- Pastoral with a Couple near a Fountain (1749), Wallace Collection, London
- Pompadour at Her Toilette (1750), Harvard Art Museums
- Sketch for a Portrait of Madame de Pompadour (c. 1750), Waddesdon Manor, Waddesdon
- The Interrupted Sleep (1750), Metropolitan Museum of Art
- The Love Letter (1750), National Gallery of Art
- The Muse Clio (c. 1750), Wallace Collection, London
- The Toilette of Venus (1751), Metropolitan Museum of Art
- The Setting of the Sun (1752), Wallace Collection, London
- The Rising of the Sun (1753), Wallace Collection, London
- Shepherd Boy Playing Bagpipes (c. 1754), Museum of Fine Arts, Boston
- Cupid a Captive (c. 1754), Wallace Collection, London
- Mars and Venus surprised by Vulcan (c. 1754), Wallace Collection, London
- Pastoral Make-Up (La toillette pastorale) (1754), Wallace Collection, London
- The Judgment of Paris (1754), Wallace Collection, London
- Venus and Vulcan (1754), Wallace Collection, London
- Landscape with a Watermill (1755), National Gallery, London
- Venus in the Workshop of Vulcan (1757), Yale University Art Gallery
- Fishing (1757), Grand Trianon
- Lovers in a Park (1758), Timken Museum of Art, San Diego
- The Dovecote (1758), Saint Louis Art Museum, Missouri
- Madame de Pompadour (1759), Wallace Collection, London
- Pan and Syrinx (1759), National Gallery, London
- Shepherd and Shepherdess Reposing (1761), Wallace Collection, London
- Study of a standing nude young woman seen from behind, raising drapery (1762), Miguel Urrutia Art Museum, Bogotá
- Angelica and Medoro (1763), Metropolitan Museum of Art
- Jupiter, in the Guise of Diana, and Callisto (1763), Metropolitan Museum of Art
- The Judgment of Paris (c. 1763), Musée des Beaux-Arts de Mulhouse
- Aurora Heralding the Arrival of the Morning Sun (1765), National Gallery of Art
- Virgin and Child with the Young Saint John the Baptist and Angels (1765), Metropolitan Museum of Art
- Halt at the Spring (1765), Museum of Fine Arts, Boston
- The Bird Has Flown (1765), Snite Museum of Art, University of Notre Dame
- Return from Market (1767), Museum of Fine Arts, Boston
- Shepherd's Idyll (1768), Metropolitan Museum of Art
- Washerwomen (1768), Metropolitan Museum of Art
- Jupiter and Callisto (1769), Wallace Collection, London

== See also ==
- List of Orientalist artists
- Orientalism
- Alastair Laing

== Bibliography ==
- Les dessins de François Boucher (in French). 2003.
- Alastair Laing; Nicolas Surlapierre; Yohan Rimaud (2019). Une des provinces du rococo : La Chine rêvée de François Boucher (in French).
