= Salon of 1765 =

1765 art exhibition in Paris

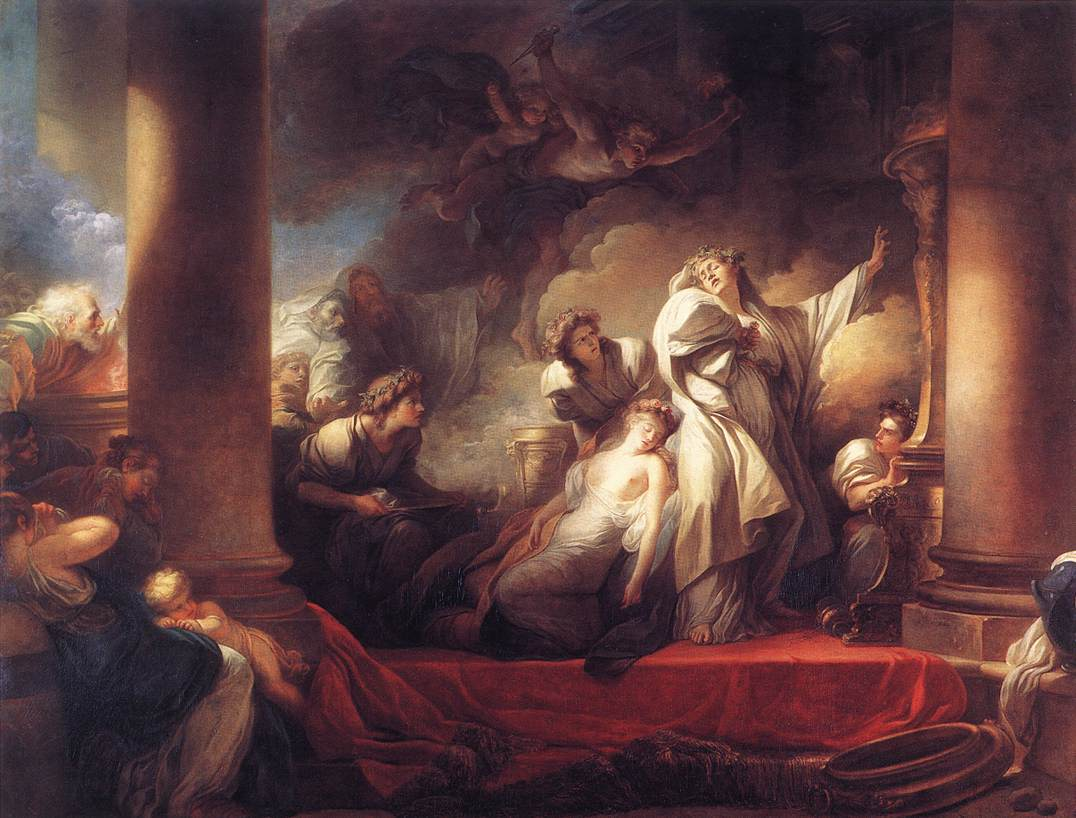
Coresus Sacrificing Himself to Save Callirhoe by Jean-Honoré Fragonard

The Salon of 1765 was an art exhibition that took place at the Louvre in Paris. One of the biannual Salon it took place during the reign of Louis XV and was overseen by the Académie Royale which at this time limited submissions to the Salon largely to its own members.

As with previous salons, the art critic Denis Diderot was an influential figure. Amongst works featured were The Arts in Supplication an allegorical painting by Charles-André van Loo that had been commissioned by the Marquis de Marigny as a tribute to his sister Madame Pompadour who had died in 1764. Van Loo also exhibited The Three Graces based on Greek Mythology. Joseph Vernet displayed a View of the Harbour of Dieppe, part of his Views of the Ports of France series. Jean-Honoré Fragonard's Coresus Sacrificing Himself to Save Callirhoe was popular with both the public and critics. Jean-Baptiste Greuze exhibited a number of works to acclaim, although this would be his last Salon until after the French Revolution. Noël Hallé submitted his Education of the Poor. Philip James de Loutherbourg who had impressed at his debut Salon two years earlier returned with a couple of landscape paintings including Morning After the Rain.

The Salon featured a number of works in the rococo style. The exhibition was preceded by the Salon of 1763 and followed by the Salon of 1767.

== Gallery ==
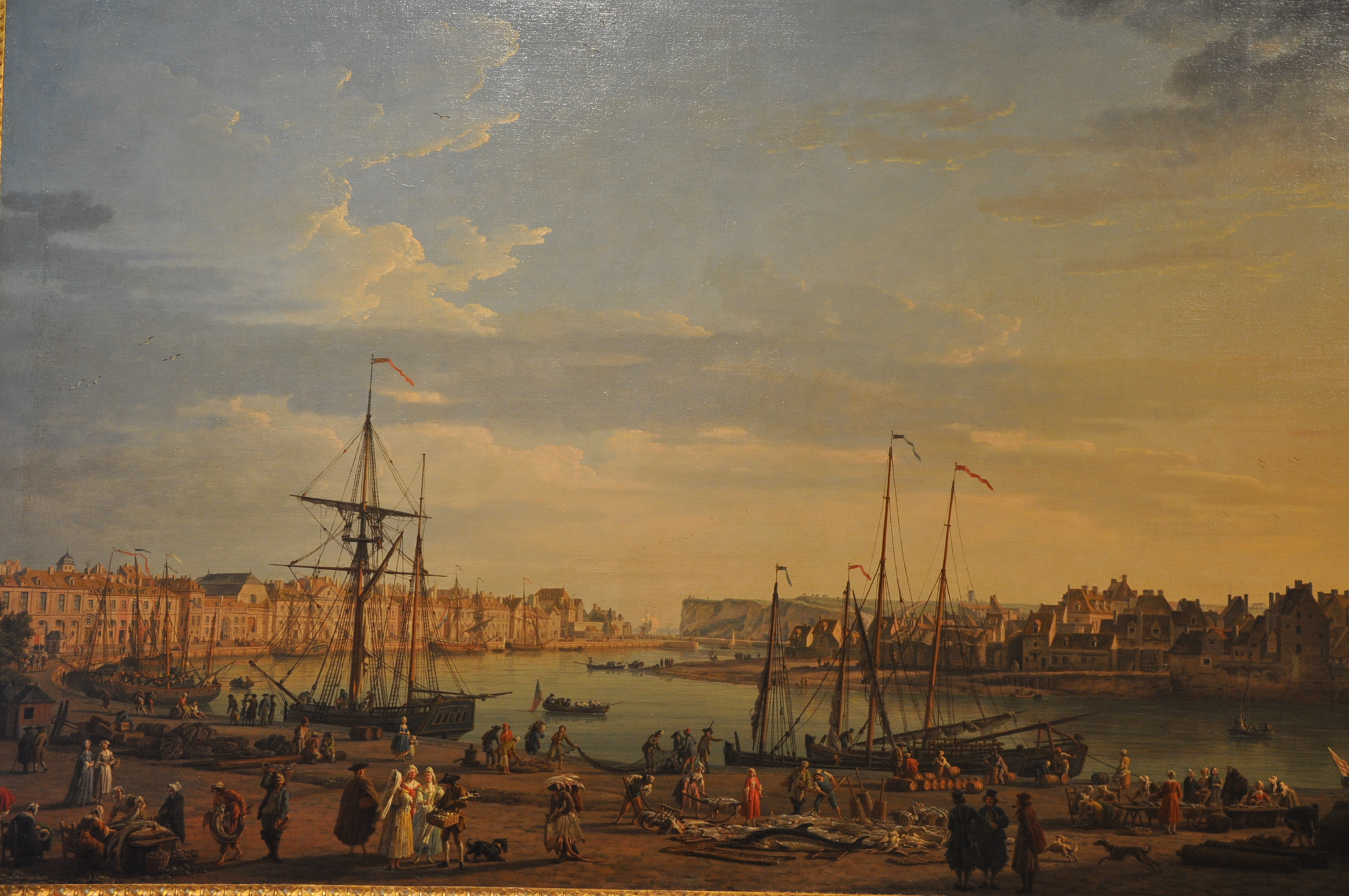
View of the Harbour of Dieppe by Joseph Vernet

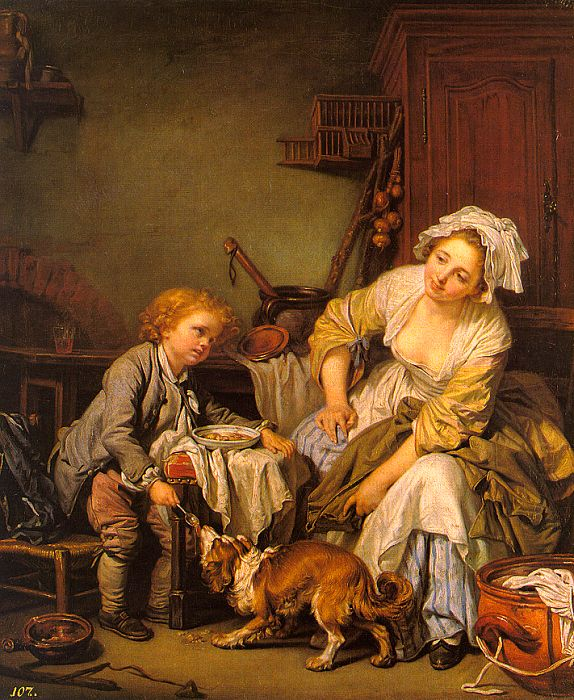
The Spoiled Child by Jean-Baptiste Greuze

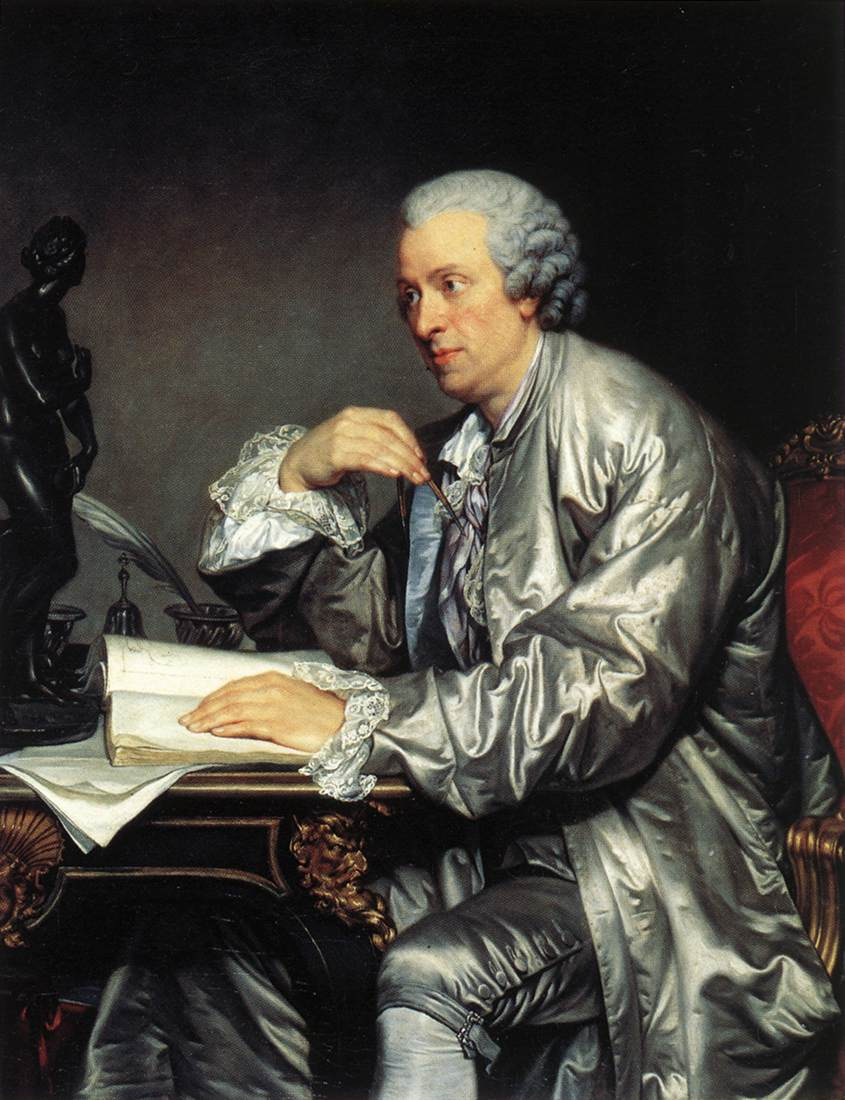
Portrait of Claude-Henri Watalet by Jean-Baptiste Greuze

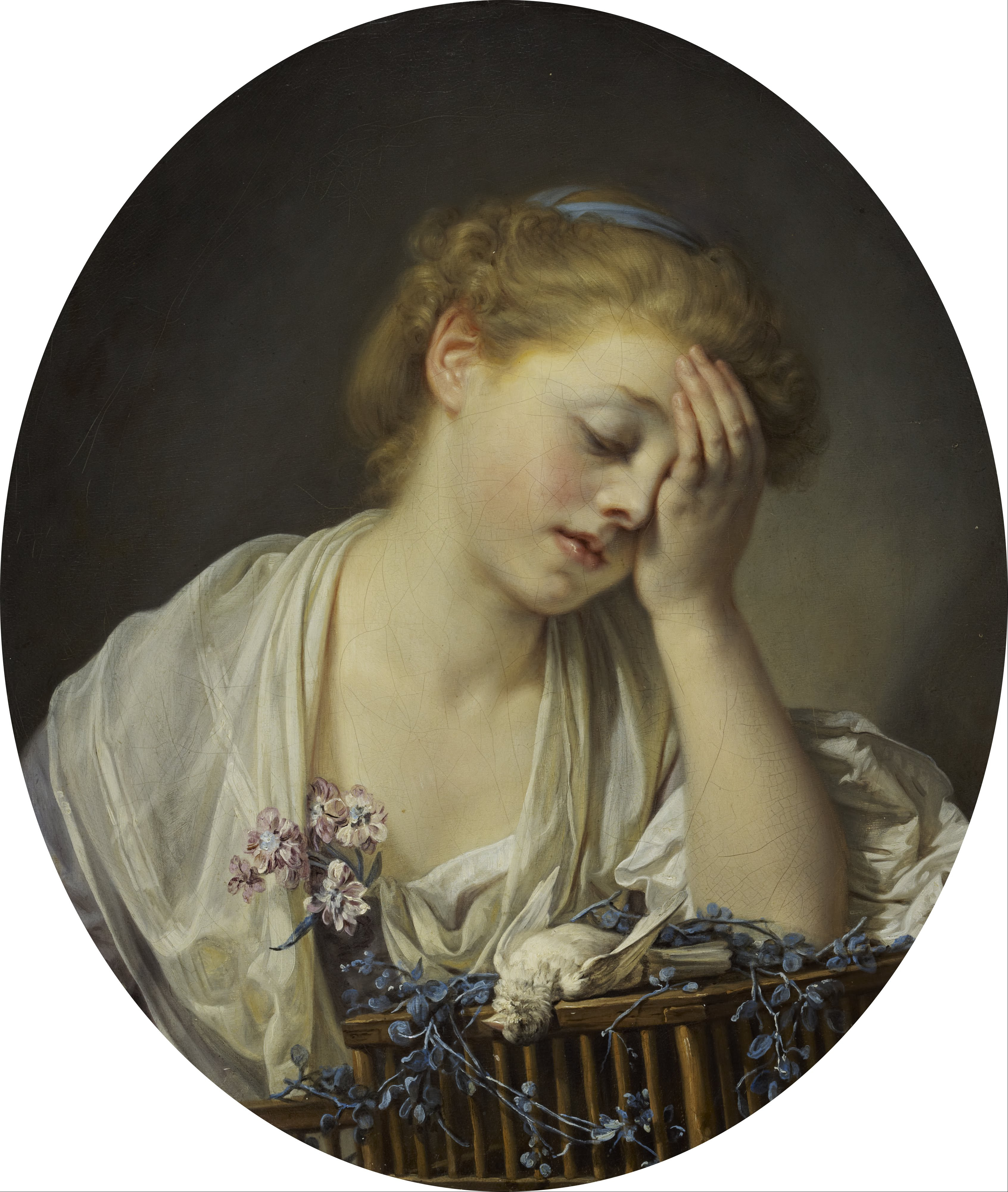
A Girl with a Dead Canary by Jean-Baptiste Greuze

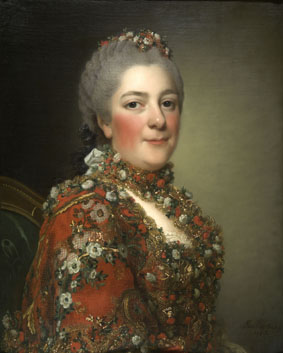
Portrait of Victoire of France by Alexander Roslin

Morning After the Rain by Philip James de Loutherbourg

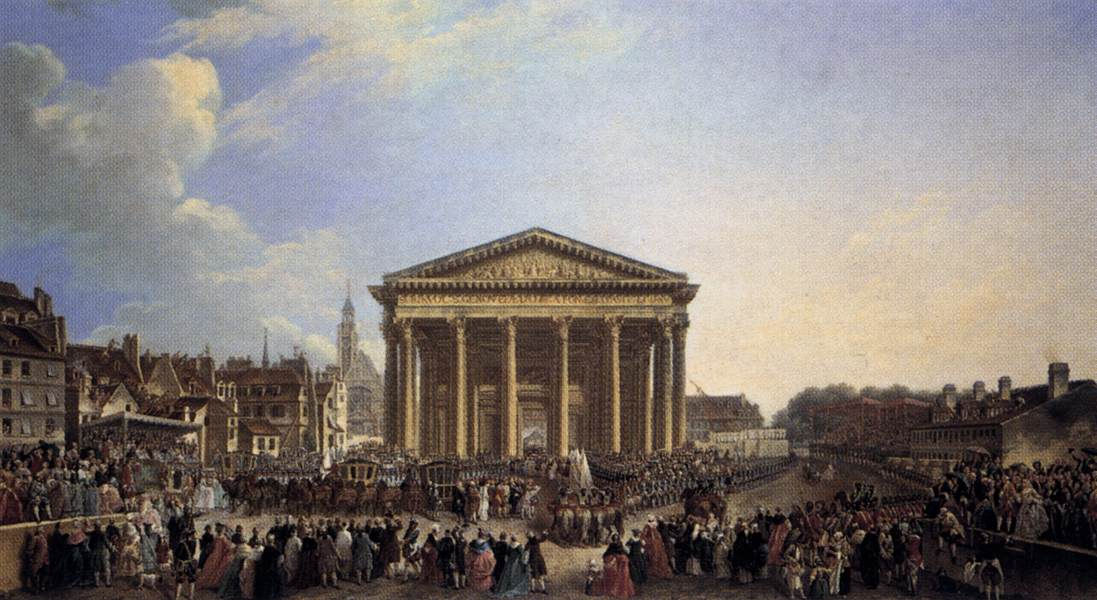
Official Laying of the Cornerstone of the New Church of Sainte-Geneviève by Pierre-Antoine Demachy

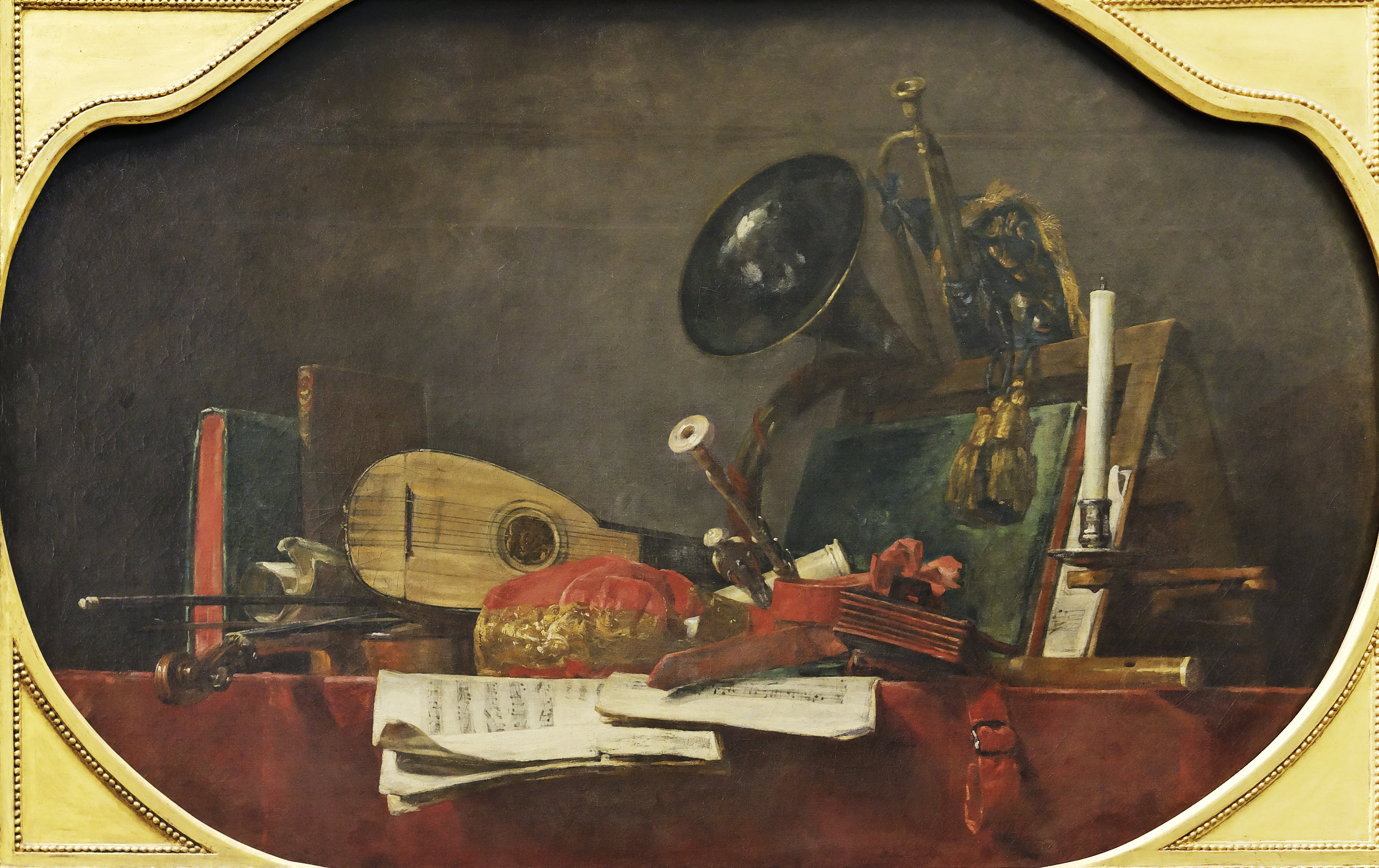
Attributes of Music by Jean Siméon Chardin

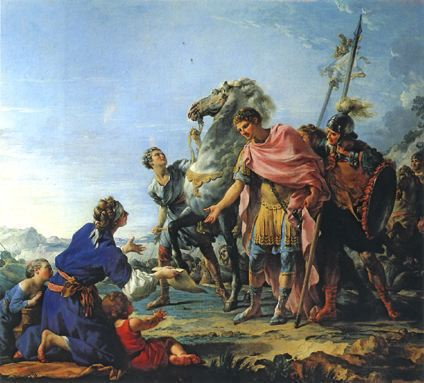
The Justice of Trajan by Noël Hallé

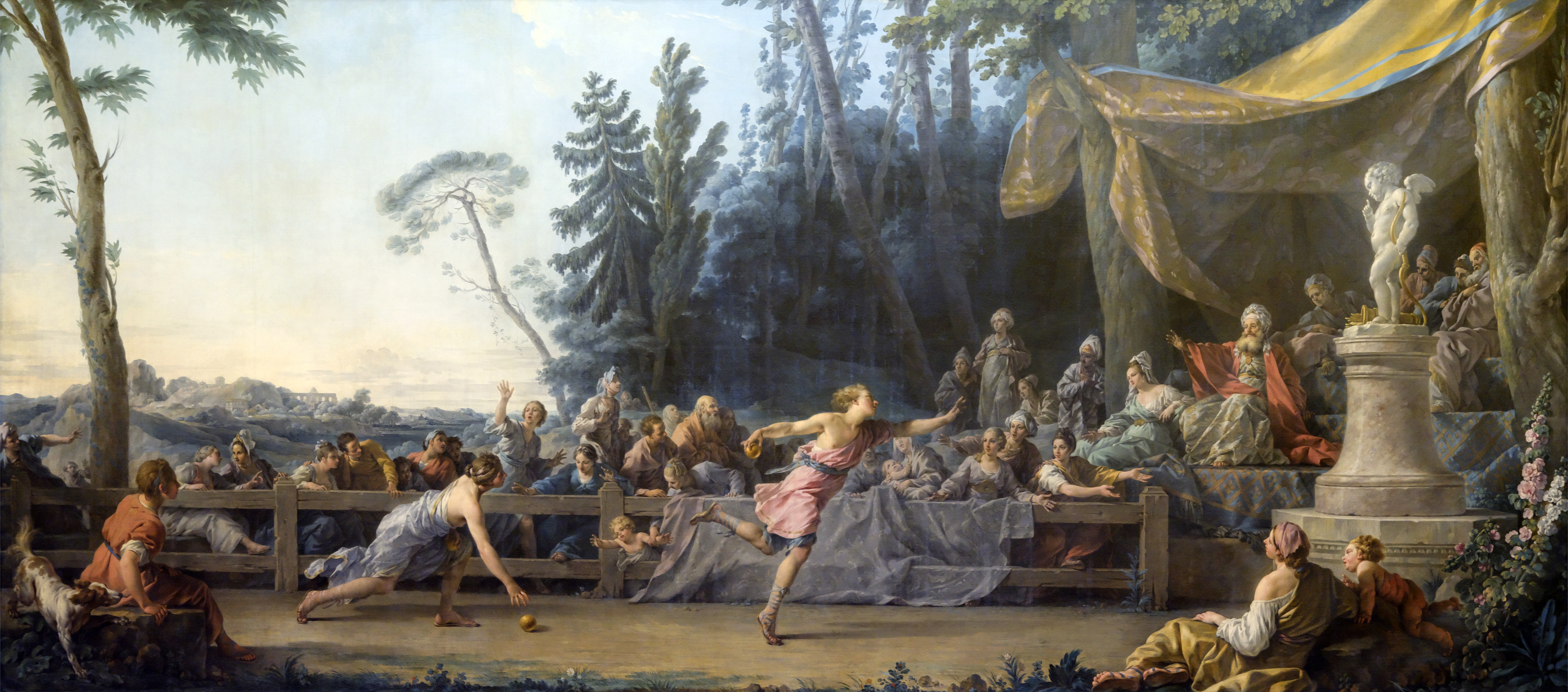
The Race Between Hippomenes and Atalanta by Noël Hallé

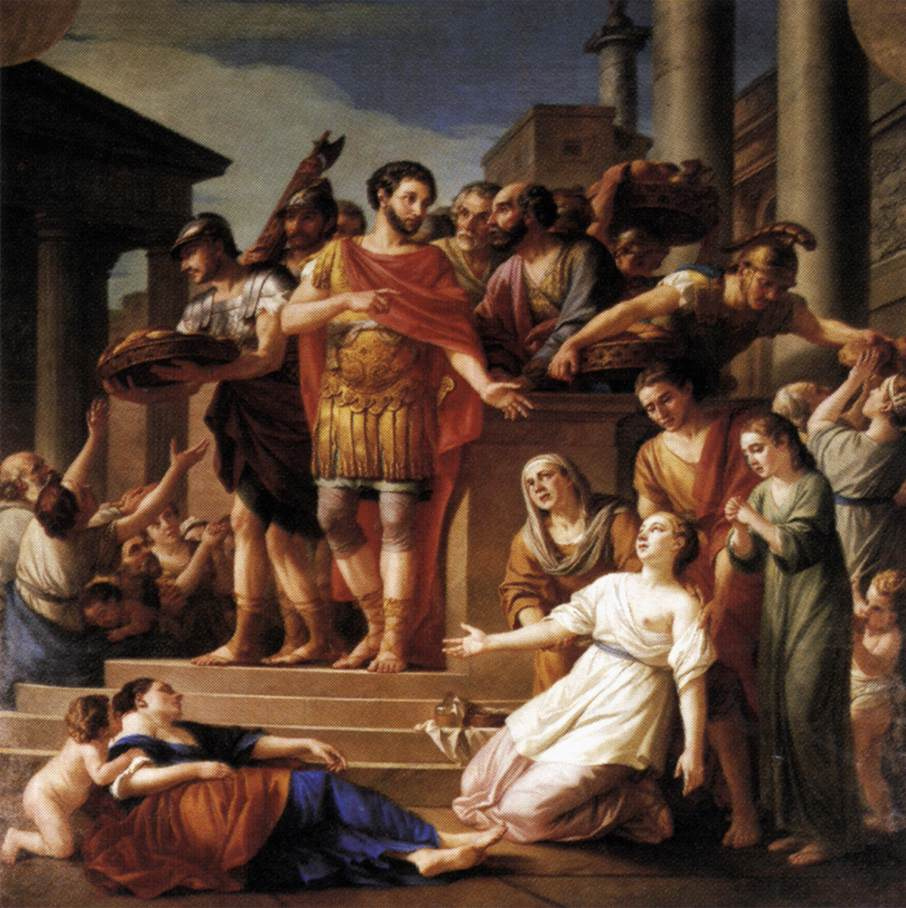
Marcus Aurelius Distributing Bread to the People by Joseph-Marie Vien

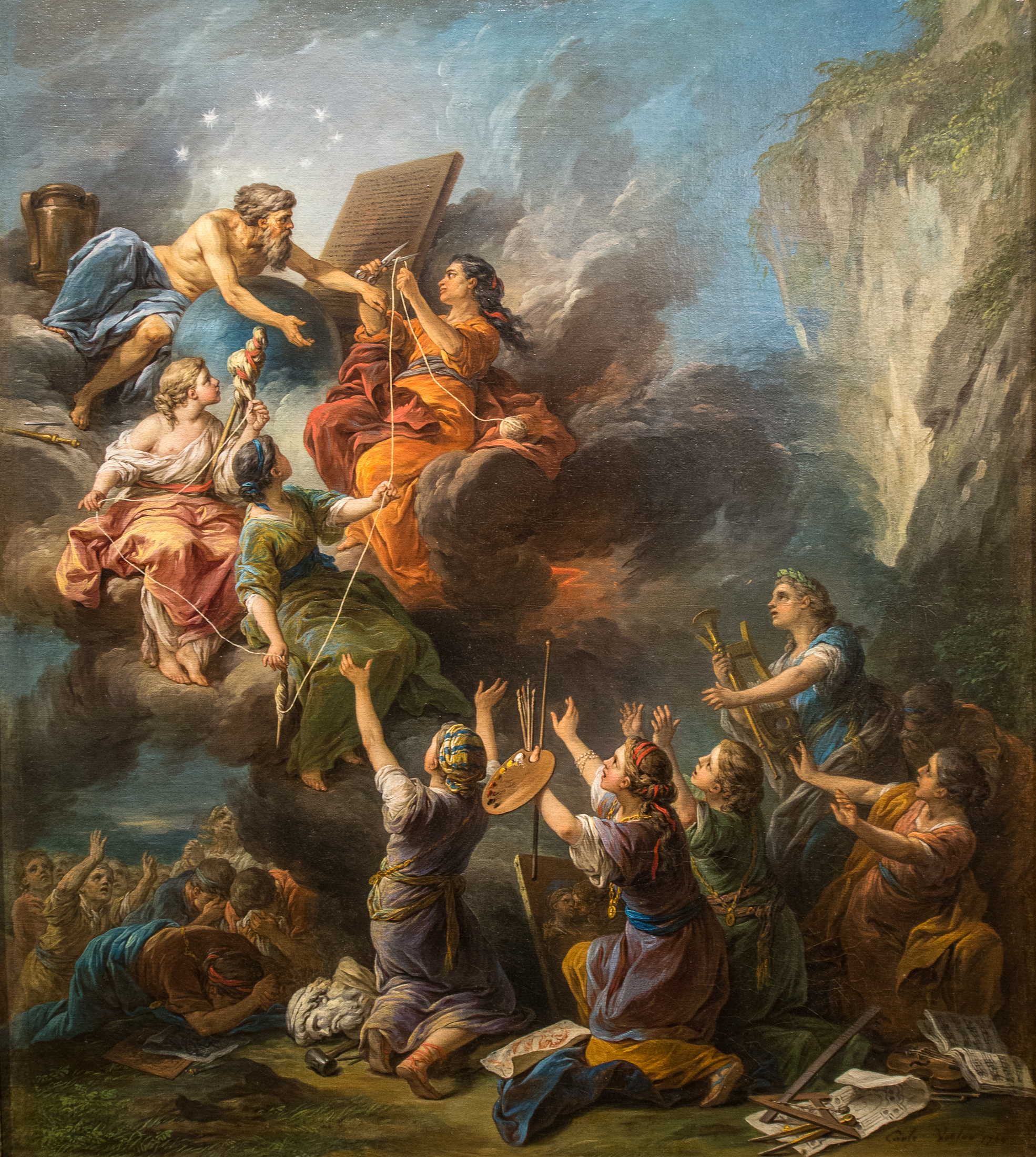
The Arts in Supplication by Charles André van Loo

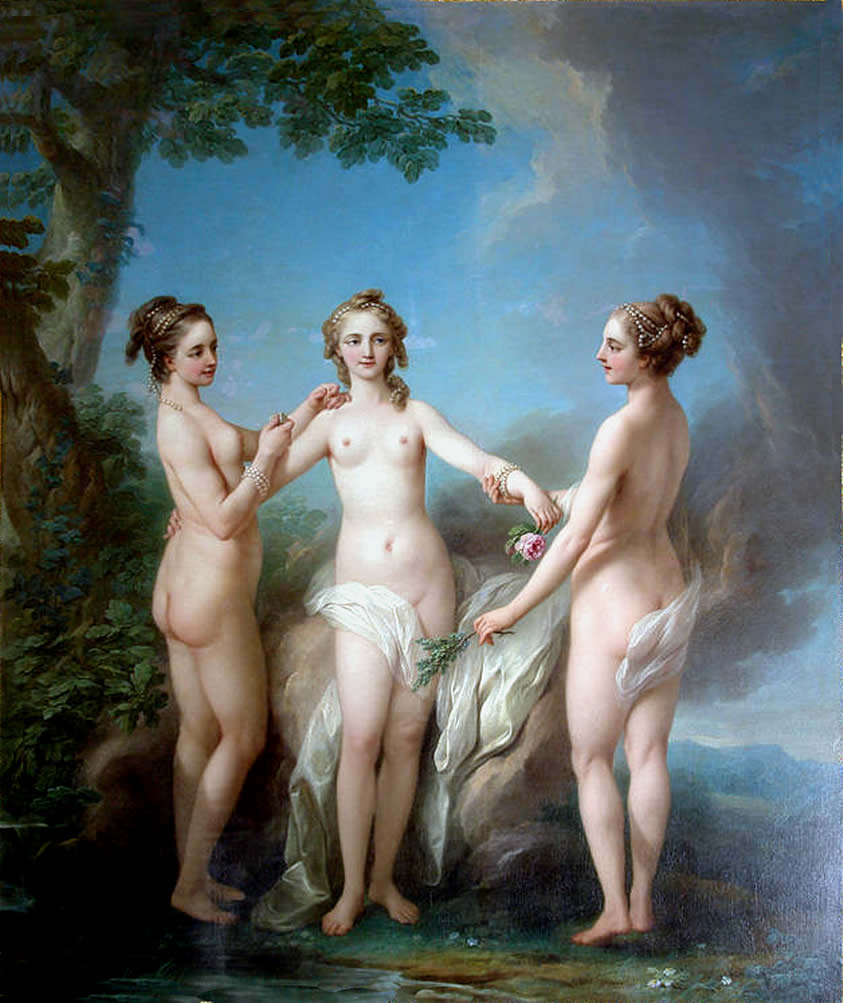
The Three Graces by Charles André van Loo

== Bibliography ==
- Fried, Michael. Absorption and Theatricality: Painting and Beholder in the Age of Diderot. University of Chicago Press, 1988.
- Levey, Michael. Painting and Sculpture in France, 1700-1789. Yale University Press, 1993.
- Scott, Katie. The Rococo Interior: Decoration and Social Spaces in Early Eighteenth-century Paris. Yale University Press, 1995.
- Sheriff, Mary D Moved by Love: Inspired Artists and Deviant Women in Eighteenth-Century France. University of Chicago Press, 2008.
