= The Justice of Trajan (Hallé) =

Painting by Noël Hallé

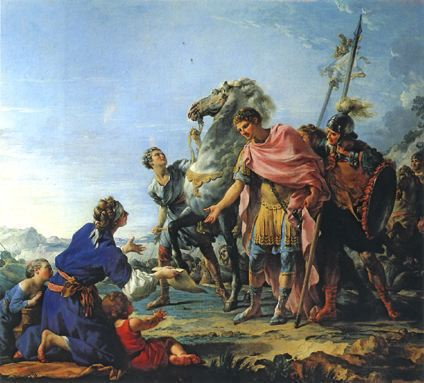
- Artist: Noël Hallé
- Year: 1765
- Type: Oil on canvas, history painting
- Dimensions: 265 cm × 302 cm (104 in × 119 in)
- Location: Museum of Fine Arts, Marseille

The Justice of Trajan (French: La clémence de Trajan) is an oil on canvas history painting by the French artist Noël Hallé, from 1765.

It features a legendary scene from Ancient Rome, the Justice of Trajan, in which the Emperor Trajan delayed his departure for a major foreign war in order to provide justice after an appeal from the widow of a murdered man.

The work was originally commissioned by Marquis of Marigny, the director general of the Ministry of Works, to hang in the royal residence the Château de Choisy. The painting was displayed at the Salon of 1765 held at the Louvre, in Paris, one of a series of works Hallé exhibited that year. Today it is in the Museum of Fine Arts in Marseille, having been acquired in 1972.

== See also ==
- The Justice of Trajan, an 1840 painting by Eugène Delacroix

== Bibliography ==
- Bailey, Colin B. The Age of Watteau, Chardin, and Fragonard: Masterpieces of French Genre Painting. Yale University Press, 2003.
- Markell, Jonathan Michael. The Influence of Classical Antiquity on the Art and Thought of Eugène Delacroix, 1806-1847. University of California Press, 1974.
- Walsh, Linda. A Guide to Eighteenth-Century Art. Wiley, 2016.
