= Coresus Sacrificing Himself to Save Callirhoe =

Painting by Jean-Honoré Fragonard

- Le grand prêtre Corésus se sacrifie pour sauver Callirhoé (French)
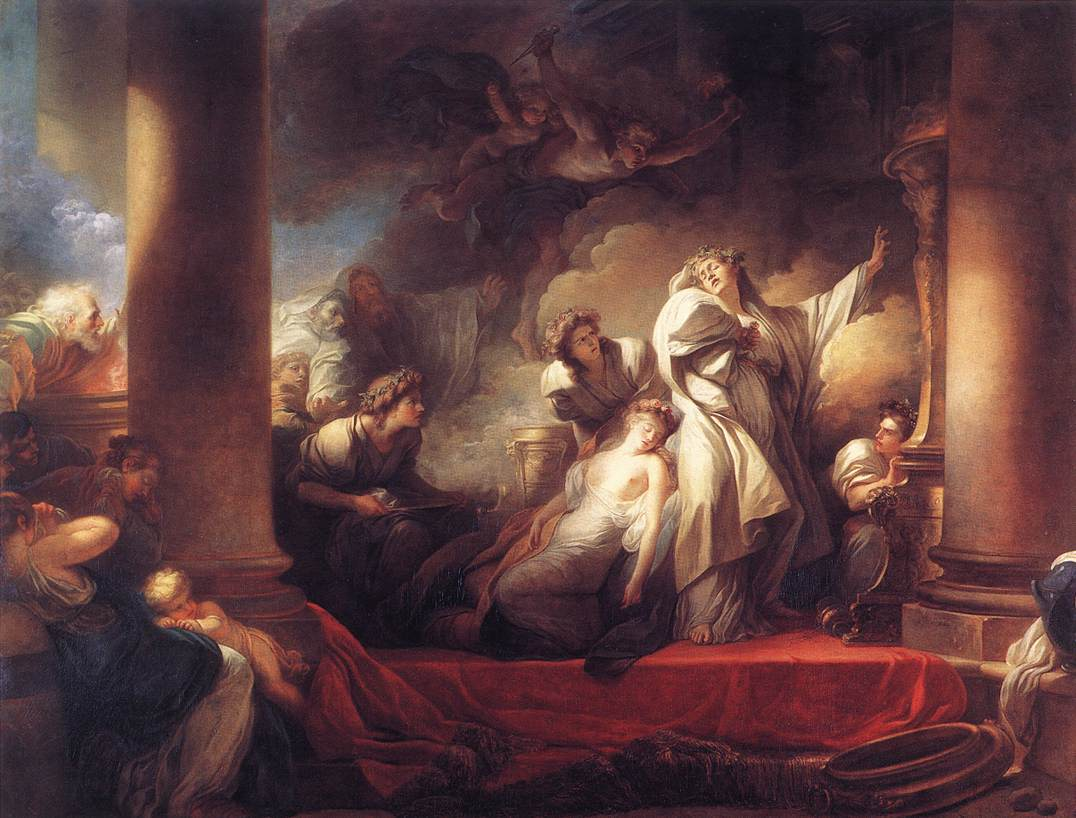
- Artist: Jean-Honoré Fragonard
- Year: 1765
- Medium: Oil on canvas
- Dimensions: 309 cm × 400 cm (122 in × 160 in)
- Location: Louvre; Paris
- Owner: France
- Accession: INV 3182

Coresus Sacrificing Himself to Save Callirhoe (French: Le grand prêtre Corésus se sacrifie pour sauver Callirhoé) is a large oil-on-canvas painting by the French Rococo artist Jean-Honoré Fragonard, created in 1765. The painting was exhibited at the Salon of 1765 and earned Fragonard entry into the Académie royale de peinture et de sculpture. It is now housed in the Louvre in Paris.

== History ==
The painting was exhibited at the Salon of 1765 and earned Fragonard entry into the Académie royale de peinture et de sculpture. It has often been described as Fragonard's attempt to reconcile his own exuberant style with academic requirements, standing in contrast to the intimate and playful works for which he would later become famous.

The work was acquired by Louis XV and remained in royal possession until it entered the national collection after the French Revolution. It is now part of the Louvre collection in Paris.

The preparatory sketch for the painting belongs to the Musée des Beaux-Arts d'Angers, and a ricordo version has been part of the Real Academia de Bellas Artes de San Fernando in Madrid since 1816. Fragonard also created a later chalk drawing of the same subject, now held by the Metropolitan Museum of Art in New York City.

== Description ==
The painting is a large-scale oil on canvas measuring 309 by 400 cm. The painting depicts a dramatic scene from ‘’Description of Greece’’ (VII, 21) by Pausanias. In the myth, Coresus, a priest of Dionysus in Calydon, is consumed by unrequited love for the maiden Callirhoë. To punish her rejection, the god sends a plague upon the city, and the oracle decrees that only her sacrifice can end it. Fragonard portrays the climactic moment when Coresus, serving as the sacrificial priest, chooses to plunge the knife into his own heart rather than kill the woman he loves. Callirhoe has collapsed beside him, unconscious, while attendants recoil in horror.

Fragonard's composition reflects the theatricality and dramatic staging common in mid-18th-century French history painting, influenced by artists such as Gabriel François Doyen and Charles-André van Loo. The scene is organised like a sacrificial tableau, with an elevated altar, red draper and monumental architectural columns evoking antiquity. A strong light highlights the principal figures, contrastng with the shadowed temple interior. Around them, spectators display a range of emotional responses, from fear to grief through varied gestures and expressions. Coresus and Callirhoe form the visual and emotional centre of the painting: she lies unconscious at the base of the altar, while he, illuminated against the darkness, prepares to take his own life. Above, allegorical figures of Love and Despair intensify the psychological dimension of the scene.

Description of Greece (VII, 21) by Pausanias

In this part of the city there is also a temple to Dionysus under the title of Calydonian: because the statue of the god was brought from Calydon. And when Calydon was still inhabited, among other Calydonians who were priests to the god was one Coresus, who of all men suffered most grievously from love. He was enamoured of the maiden Callirhoe, but in proportion to the greatness of his love was the dislike of the maiden to him. And as by all his wooing and promises and gifts the maiden’s mind was not in the least changed, he went as a suppliant to the statue of Dionysus. And the god heard the prayer of his priest, and the Calydonians forthwith became insane as with drink, and died beside themselves. They went therefore in their consternation to consult the oracle at Dodona: for those who dwell on this mainland, as the Ætolians and their neighbours the Acarnanians and Epirotes, believe in the oracular responses they get from doves and the oak there. And they were oracularly informed at Dodona that it was the wrath of Dionysus that had caused this trouble, which would not end till Coresus either sacrificed to Dionysus Callirhoe or somebody who should volunteer to die instead of her. And as the maiden found no means of escape, she fled to those who had brought her up, but obtaining no aid from them, she had nothing now left but to die. But when all the preliminary sacrificial rites that had been ordered at Dodona had taken place, and she was led to the altar as victim, then Coresus took his place as sacrificial priest, and yielding to love and not to anger slew himself instead of her. And when she saw Coresus lying dead the poor girl repented, and, moved by pity and shame at his fate, cut her own throat at the well in Calydon not far from the harbour, which has ever since been called Callirhoe after her.

—

== Reception ==
At the time of its exhibition in 1765, Fragonard then thirty three years old—was regarded as one of the leading hopes for the revival of French history painting, or the grand genre Coresus Sacrificing Himself to Save Callirhoe, his reception piece for the Académie royale, achieved immediate success at the Salon of 1765 and was praised by contemporary critics, including Denis Diderot. The painting's emotional force and technical refinement established Fragonard's reputation within the academic tradition. Following the Salon, he attracted the attention of the marquis de Marigny, director of the Bâtiments du Roi, who commissioned a companion piece intended as a design for tapestry production at the Gobelins Manufactory.

== Gallery ==
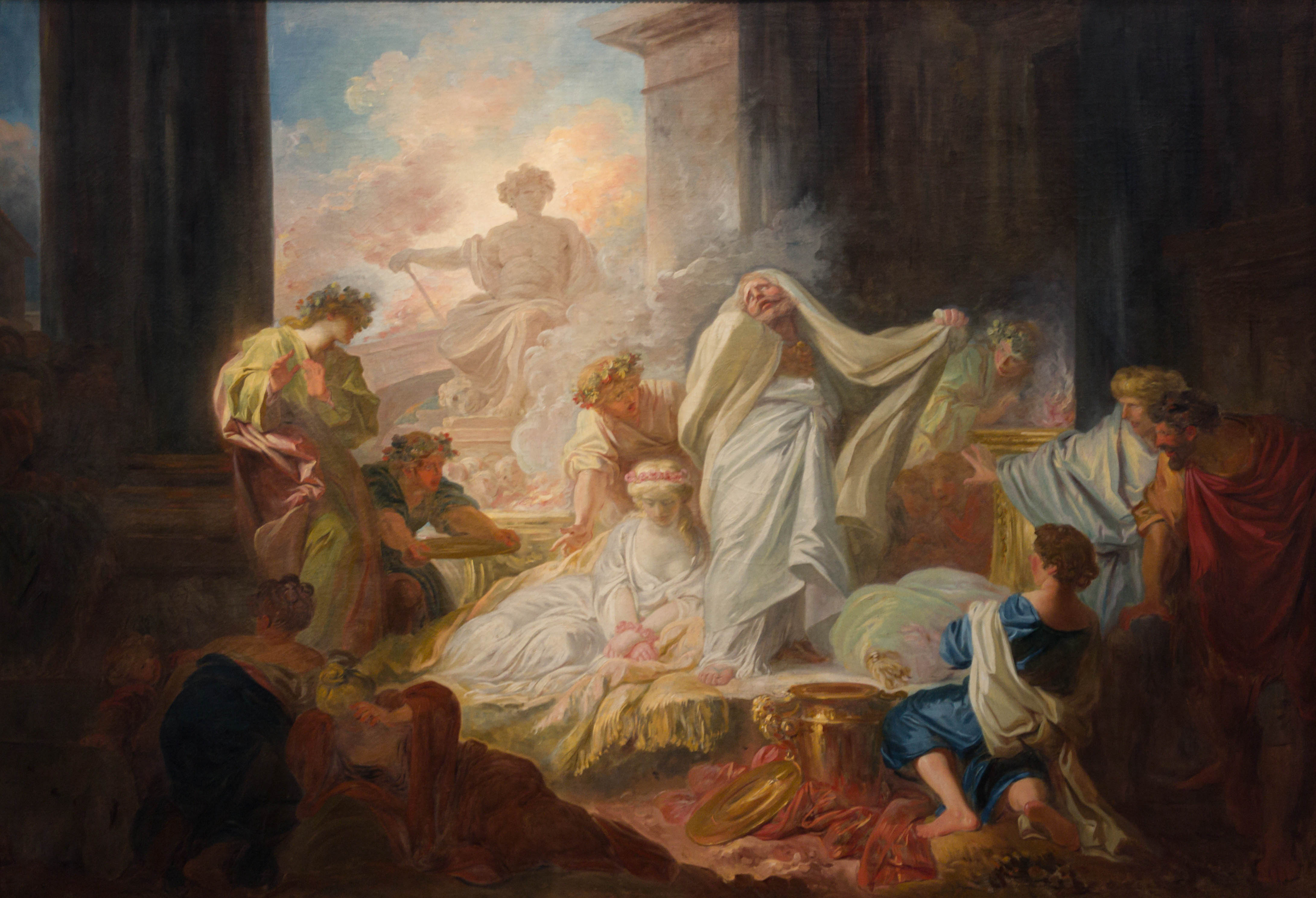
Oil sketch, Musée des Beaux-Arts d’Angers

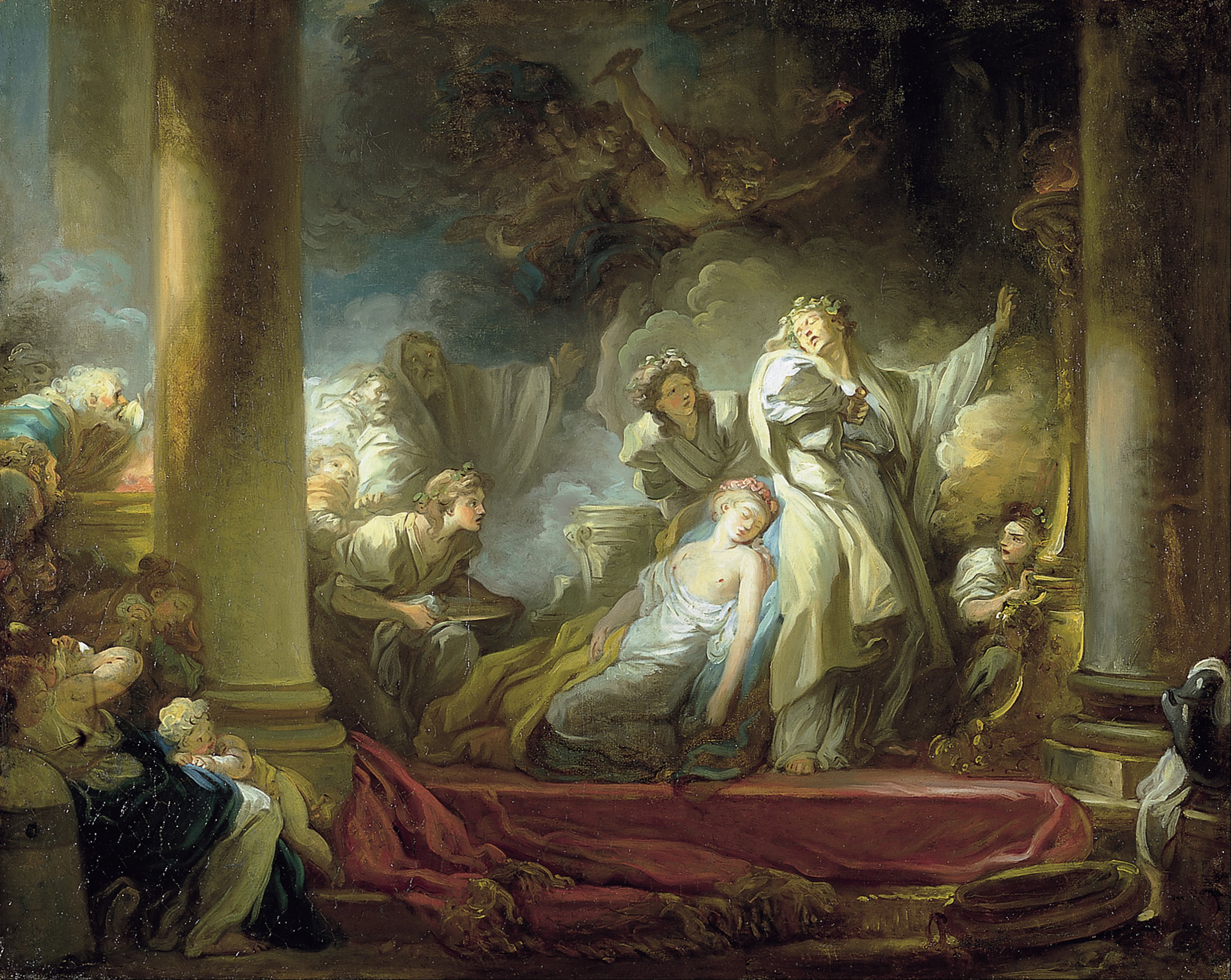
Ricordo, Academia de San Fernando, Madrid

== See also ==
- List of works by Fragonard
