= The Three Graces (Van Loo) =

Painting by Charles-André van Lpo

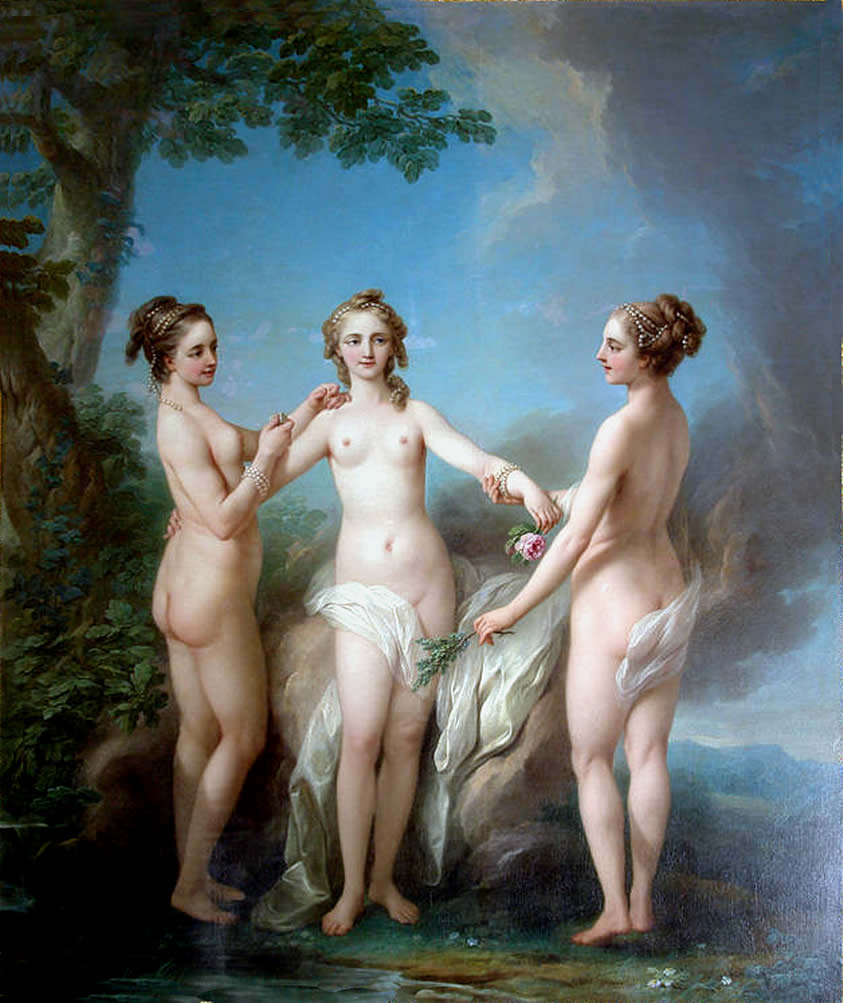
- Artist: Charles-André van Loo
- Year: c.1765
- Type: Oil on canvas
- Dimensions: 250 cm × 204 cm (98 in × 80 in)
- Location: Château de Chenonceau; Chenonceau

The Three Graces is a 1765 rococo oil painting by the French artist Charles-André van Loo. Depicting a scene from Greek Mythology, it portrays The Three Graces.

Van Loo had produced an earlier version of The Three Graces which he exhibited at the Salon of 1763. Despite receiving a warm reception from newspapers, the influential Madame Pompadour expressed a dislike for it. Van Loo then set about producing another painting for the subsequent Salon of 1765, although in the event it was exhibited after both his and Pompadour's deaths. The three women were apparently modelled after Louise Julie de Mailly-Nesle, a former mistress of Louis XV and two of her sisters.

Today the painting is in the collection of the Château de Chenonceau in Centre-Val de Loire.

== Bibliography ==
- Bearne, Catherine Mary Charlton. A Court Painter and His Circle: François Boucher. McBride, Nast & Company, 1914.
- Calhoon, Kenneth Scott. Affecting Grace: Theatre, Subject, and the Shakespearean Paradox in German Literature from Lessing to Kleist. University of Toronto Press, 2013.
- Hyde, Melissa Lee. Making Up the Rococo: François Boucher and His Critics. Getty Publications, 2006.
- Tressider, Jack. DK Eyewitness Travel Guide: Loire Valley. Dorling Kindersley Ltd, 2010.
