= Justice of Trajan =

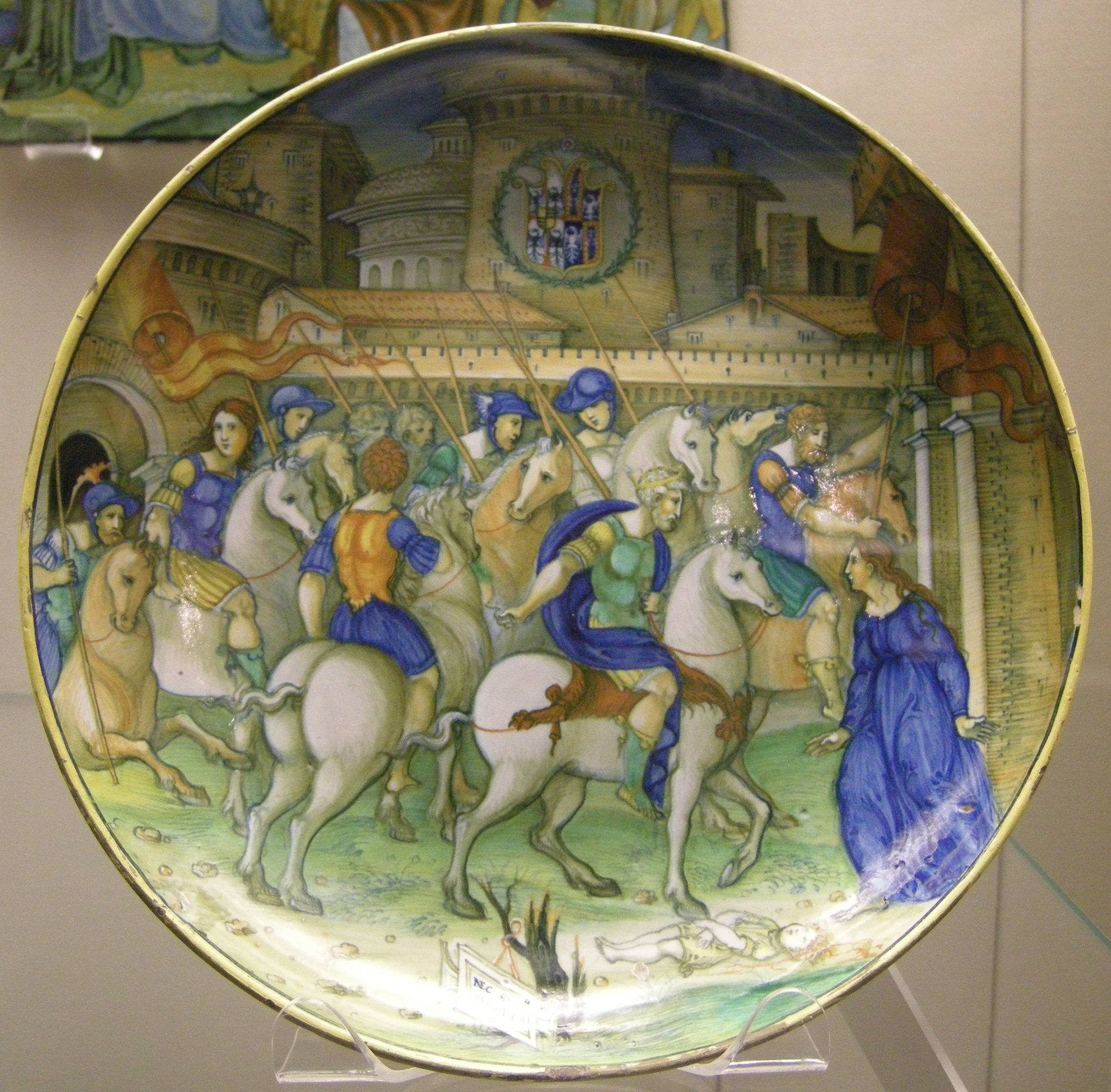
The episode on a maiolica plate, Urbino, 16th century.

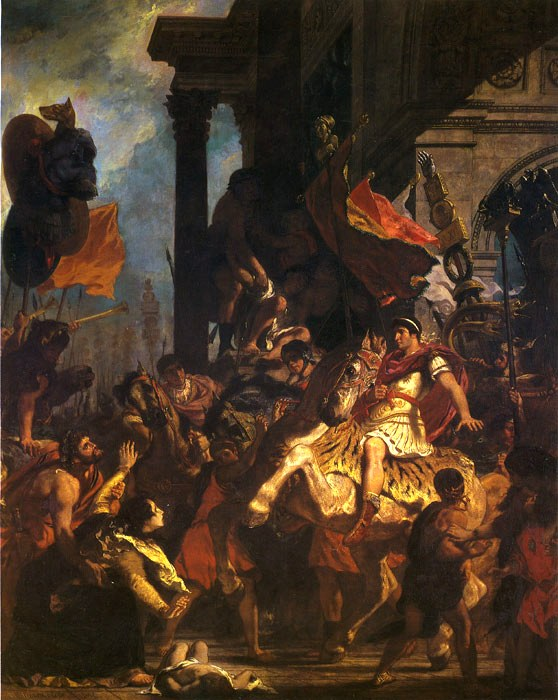
The Justice of Trajan by Eugène Delacroix, 1840.

The Justice of Trajan is a legendary episode in the life of Roman Emperor Trajan, based upon Dio Cassius' account (Epitome of Book LXVIII, chapter 10): "He did not, however, as might have been expected of a warlike man, pay any less attention to the civil administration nor did he dispense justice any the less; on the contrary, he conducted trials, now in the Forum of Augustus, now in the Portico of Livia, as it was called, and often elsewhere on a tribunal."

According to the story, Trajan, busy with preparations for the Dacian Wars, was petitioned for justice by the mother of a murdered man. He asked her to wait until he returned, but she pointed out that he might not return at all. He made time to settle her case despite all the other calls on his time. The legend, though indirectly, was popularized by Dante in The Divine Comedy, alluded to in the Paradise, and recounted in Purgatory, X, 73-94:

The wretch appear'd amid all these to say:

"Grant vengeance, sire! for, woe beshrew this heart
My son is murder'd." He replying seem'd;
"Wait now till I return." And she, as one
Made hasty by her grief; "O sire, if thou
Dost not return?"—"Where I am, who then is,
May right thee."—"What to thee is other's good,
If thou neglect thy own?"—"Now comfort thee,"
At length he answers. "It beseemeth well
My duty be perform'd, ere I move hence:

So justice wills; and pity bids me stay.

The origin of the legend and its vicissitudes since antiquity have been the subject of several studies, including the detailed "Leggende" by G. Boni, published in 1906. The episode was depicted in several works of art and in the verse The Justice by Belarusian poet Simeon of Polotsk (1629—1680). Visually, the core motif is the confrontation between the emperor, often mounted on a horse, and the widow, sometimes shown kneeling. Some depictions, like that carved on the facade of the Doge's Palace, Venice, are restricted to those figures, but often there is a great crowd of the emperor's army and courtiers. Among artists that depicted the legend are Eugène Delacroix, Rogier van der Weyden, Hans Sebald Beham, Noël Coypel and Noël Hallé. A French painter Raoul Dufy was inspired by Delacroix's painting of the justice.

Historically, the justice of Trajan may also refer either to what was described by Pliny the Younger (Epistulae, VI, 31, a court trial in Centumcellae) or depicted on Trajan's Column, where Trajan judges the captured barbarian chiefs, or to a lost painting by Rogier van der Weyden. (The city of Brussels commissioned Van der Weyden to paint four large panel paintings for the Brussels Town Hall illustrating the 'Justice of Trajan' and the 'Justice of Herkenbald'; they were destroyed when the French bombarded the city in 1695).

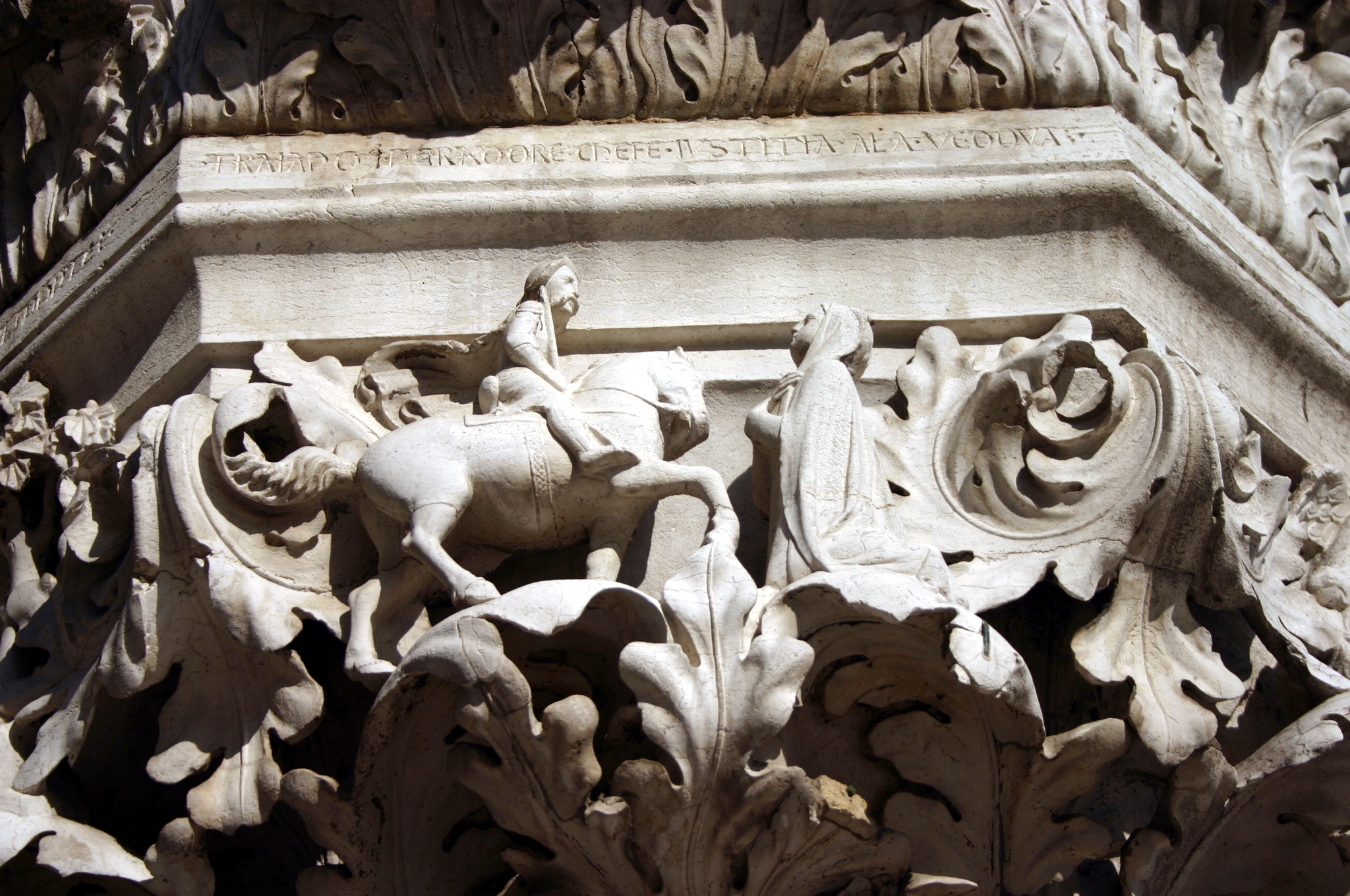
Capital on the "Corner of Justice" of the Doge's Palace, Venice

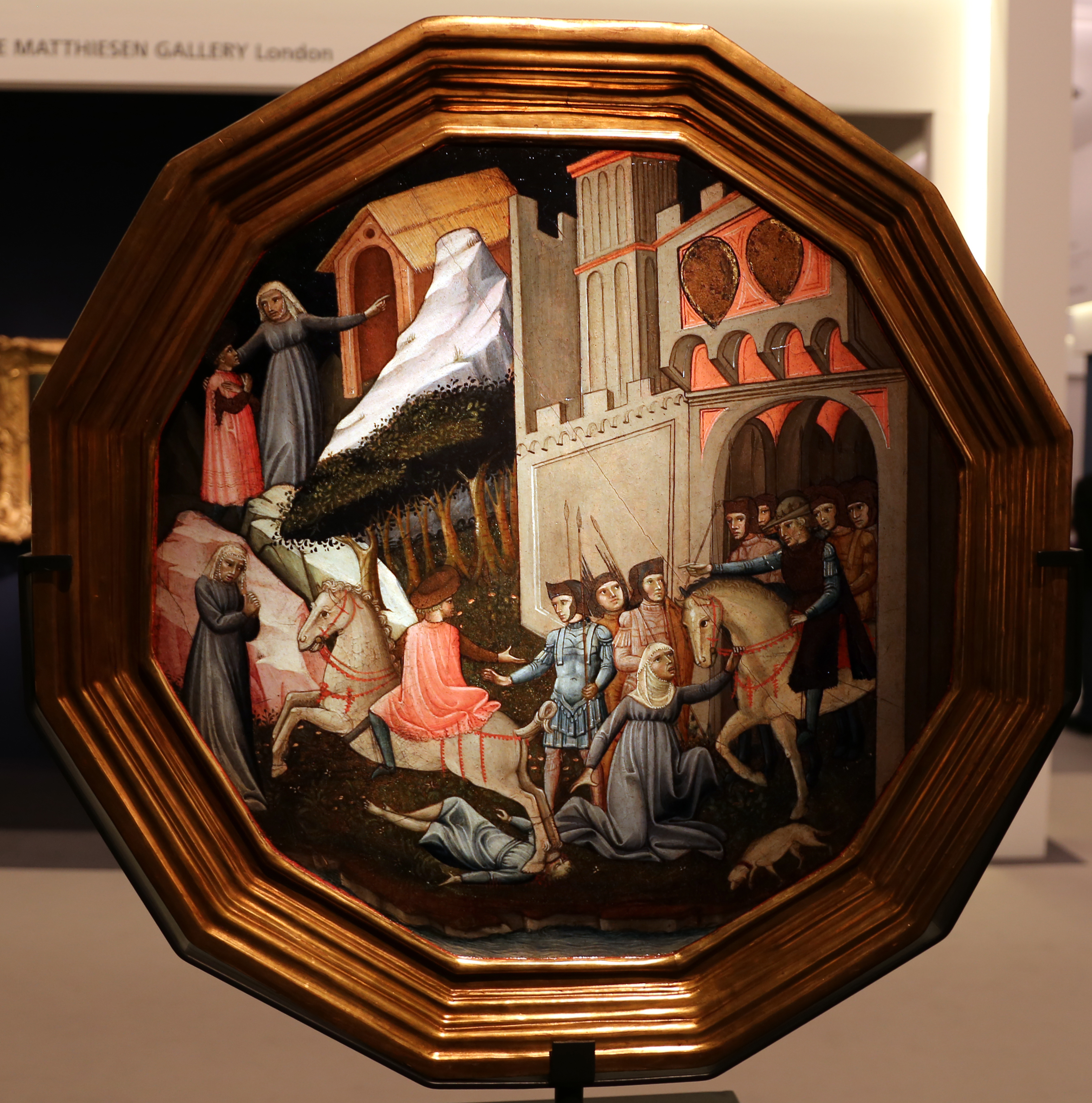
15th-century Italian desco da parto

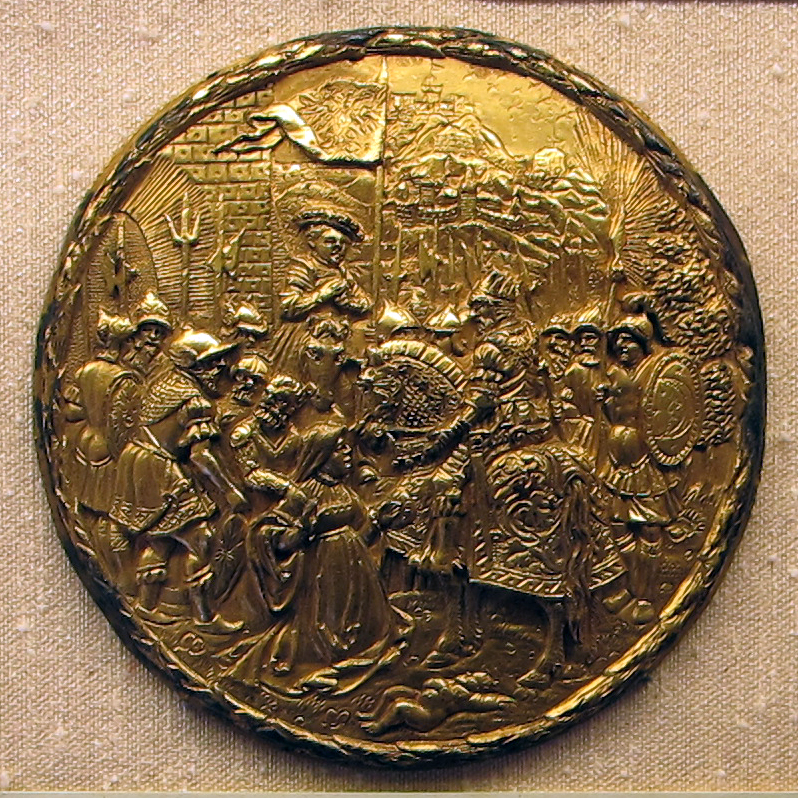
German plaquette, 1525-50

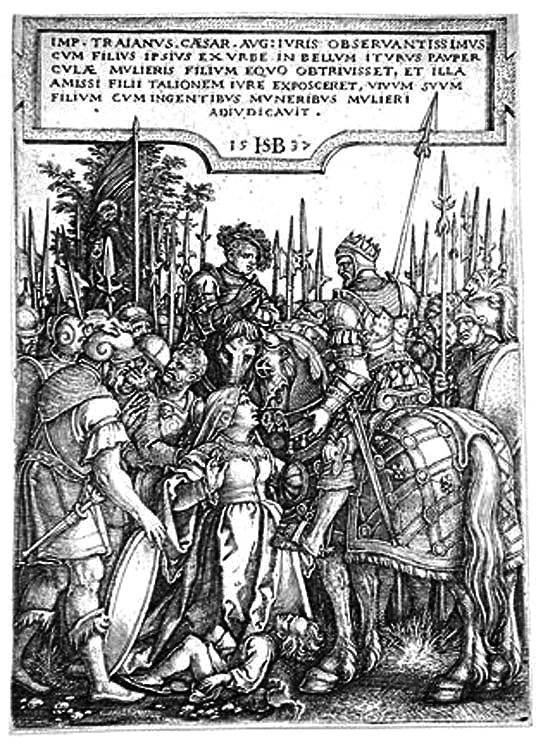
The Justice of Trajan by Hans Sebald Beham

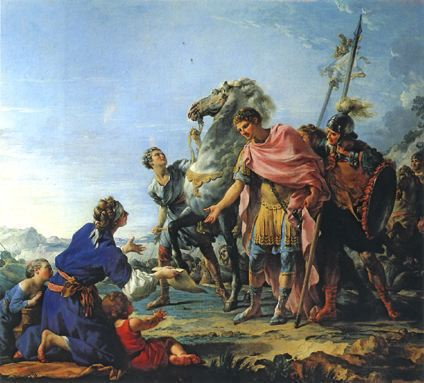
The Justice of Trajan (La clémence de Trajan) by Noël Hallé
