= The Justice of Trajan =

Painting by Eugène Delacroix

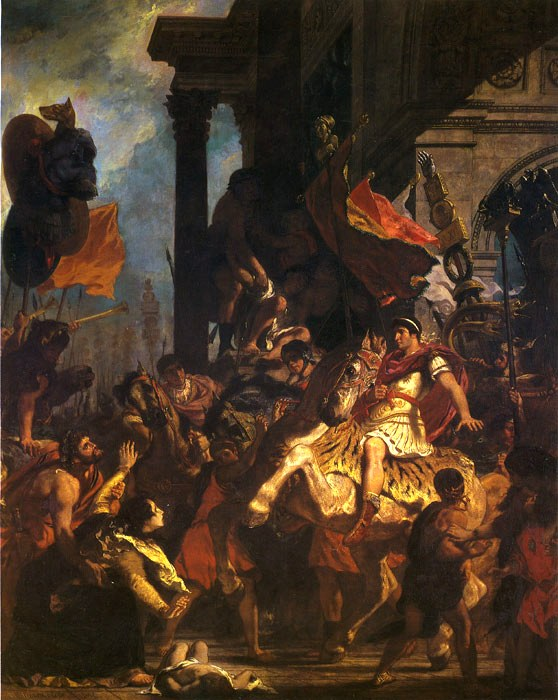
- Artist: Eugène Delacroix
- Year: 1840
- Type: Oil on canvas, history painting
- Dimensions: 490 cm × 390 cm (190 in × 150 in)
- Location: Musée des Beaux-Arts; Rouen

The Justice of Trajan is an 1840 history painting by the French romantic artist Eugène Delacroix. It illustrates the Justice of Trajan, a legendary story about the Roman Emperor Trajan. The subject is taken from Dante’s Purgatory song X. Before departing for the Dacian Wars, Trajan was petitioned by a widow seeking justice for her murdered husband. He delayed his departure in order to personally render justice. The subject was likely to have been suggested by Delacroix's friend Frédéric Villot.

The painting was displayed at the Salon of 1840 at the Louvre in Paris. It also featured in a retrospective of Delacroix's works at the Salon of 1855, held as part of the Exposition Universelle. Today it is in the collection of the Musée des Beaux-Arts in Rouen. But originally the painting was supposed to be sent to Bordeaux, but the artist asked for it to be sent to Rouen in honor of Géricault´s memory.

== Bibliography ==
- Allard, Sébastien & Fabre, Côme. Delacroix. Metropolitan Museum of Art, 2018.
- Friedlaender, Walter F. David to Delacroix. Harvard University Press, 1952.
- Rosenblum, Robert. Transformations in Late Eighteenth Century Art. Princeton University Press, 1970.
