= Noël Hallé =

French painter

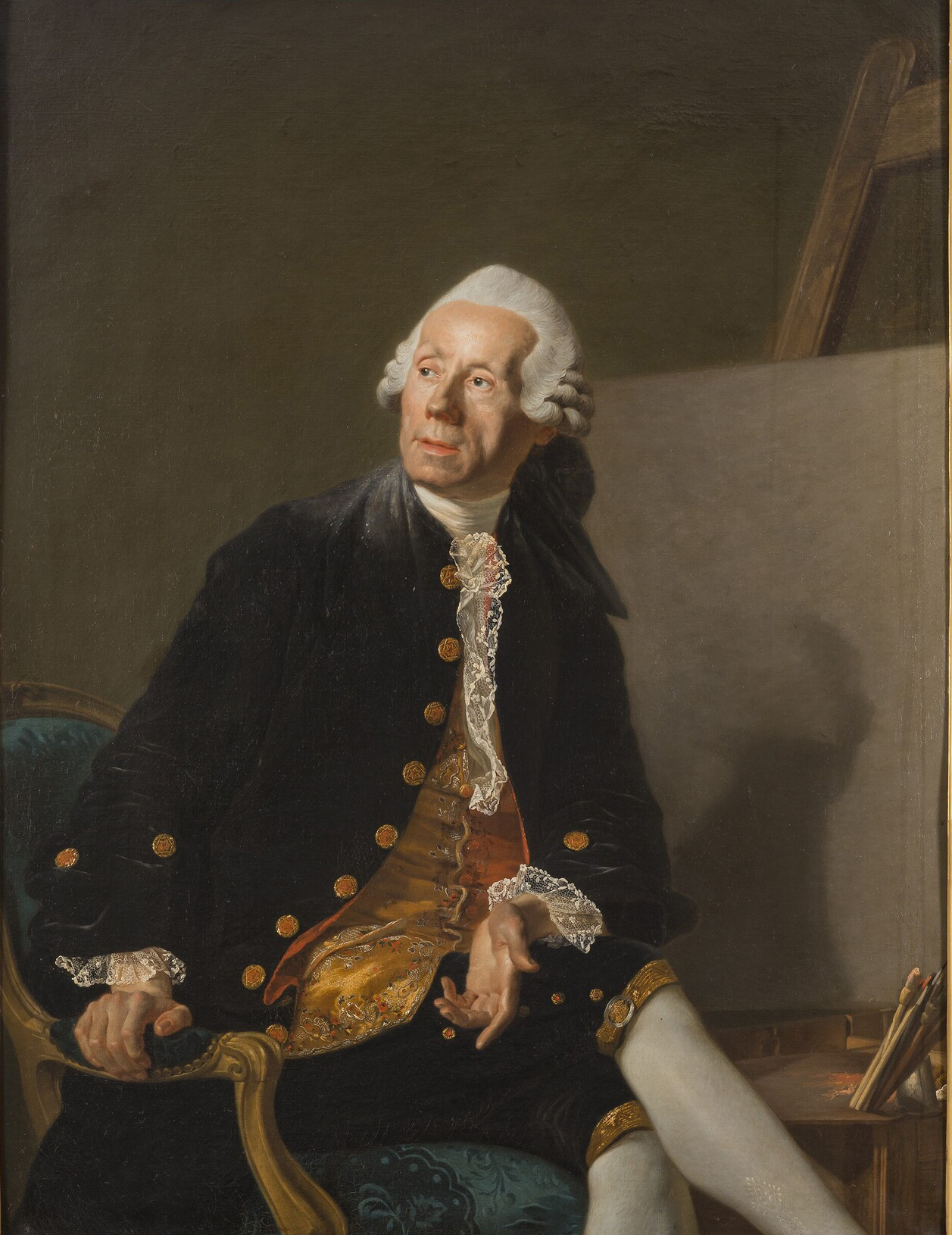
Portrait of Noël Hallé by Étienne Aubry, c. 1775

Noël Hallé (French pronunciation: [nɔɛl ale]; 2 September 1711 – 5 June 1781) was a French painter, draftsman and printmaker. He was born in Paris into a family of artists; his father was Claude-Guy Hallé.

Hallé took the Prix de Rome in 1736. He studied at the French Academy in Rome from 1737 until 1744 under the direction of Jean-Francois de Troy. As a history painter, he received royal commissions for work at the Grand Trianon, Choisy, the Petit Trianon, and for the Batiments; he worked for the Gobelins Manufactory factory, for the city of Paris and for the King of Poland. Among his works are Ancient Rome-related The Death of Seneca, Cornelia, Mother of the Gracchi and The Justice of Trajan. Hallé has had numerous works displayed at the Louvre including La Dispute de Minerve et de Neptune and La fuite en Egypte. He died in Paris in 1781.

== Gallery ==
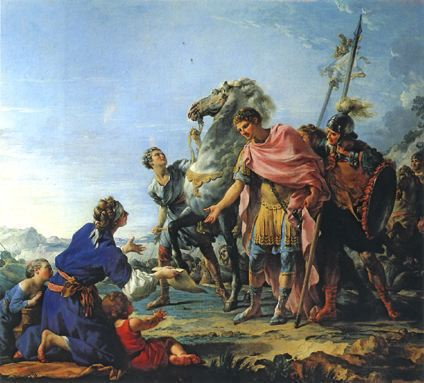
The Justice of Trajan, 1765

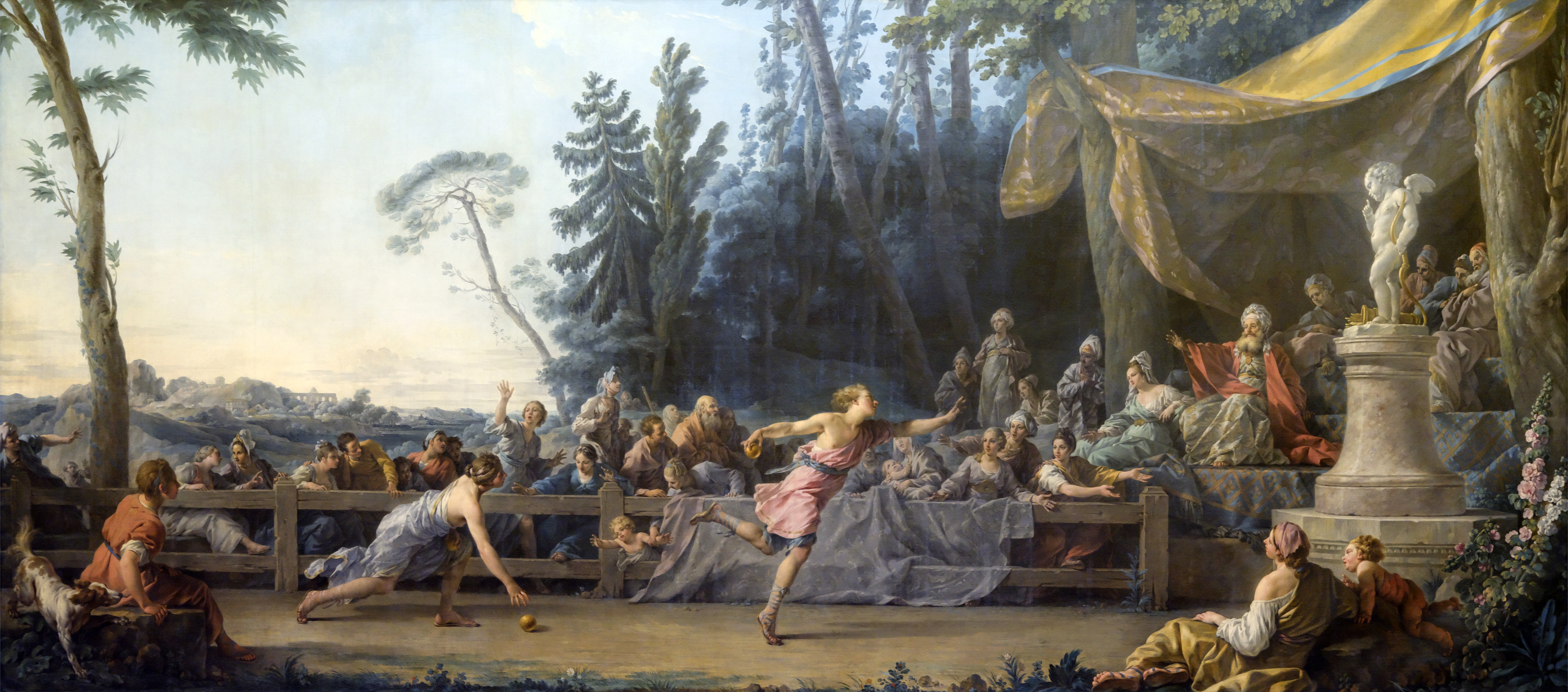
The Race Between Hippomenes and Atalanta , 1765

== Bibliography ==
- Bailey, Colin B. The Age of Watteau, Chardin, and Fragonard: Masterpieces of French Genre Painting. Yale University Press, 2003.
