= Charles-André van Loo =

French painter (1705–1765)

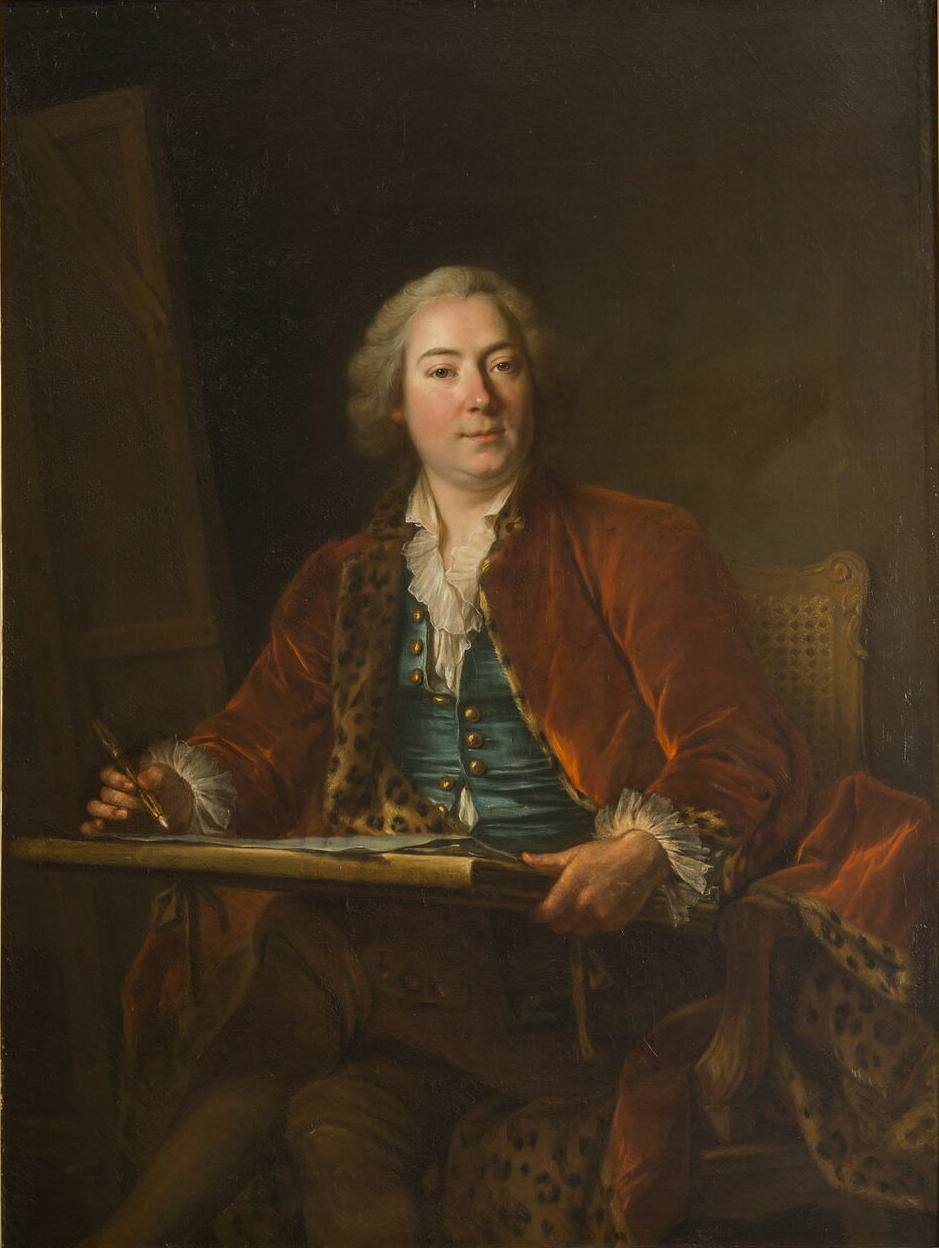
- Portrait by Pierre Le Sueur, 1747
- Born: 15 February 1705; Nice, County of Nice (now France)
- Died: 15 July 1765 (aged 60); Paris, Kingdom of France
- Education: Benedetto Luti, Rome; Académie Royale, Paris
- Known for: Painter
- Movement: Orientalist; Modern French school

Carle or Charles-André van Loo (French pronunciation: [ʃaʁl ɑ̃dʁe vɑ̃ lo]; 15 February 1705 – 15 July 1765) was a French painter, son of the painter Louis-Abraham van Loo, a younger brother of Jean-Baptiste van Loo and grandson of Jacob van Loo. He was the most famous member of a successful dynasty of painters of Dutch origin. His oeuvre includes every category: religion, history painting, mythology, portraiture, allegory, and genre scenes.

== Life ==
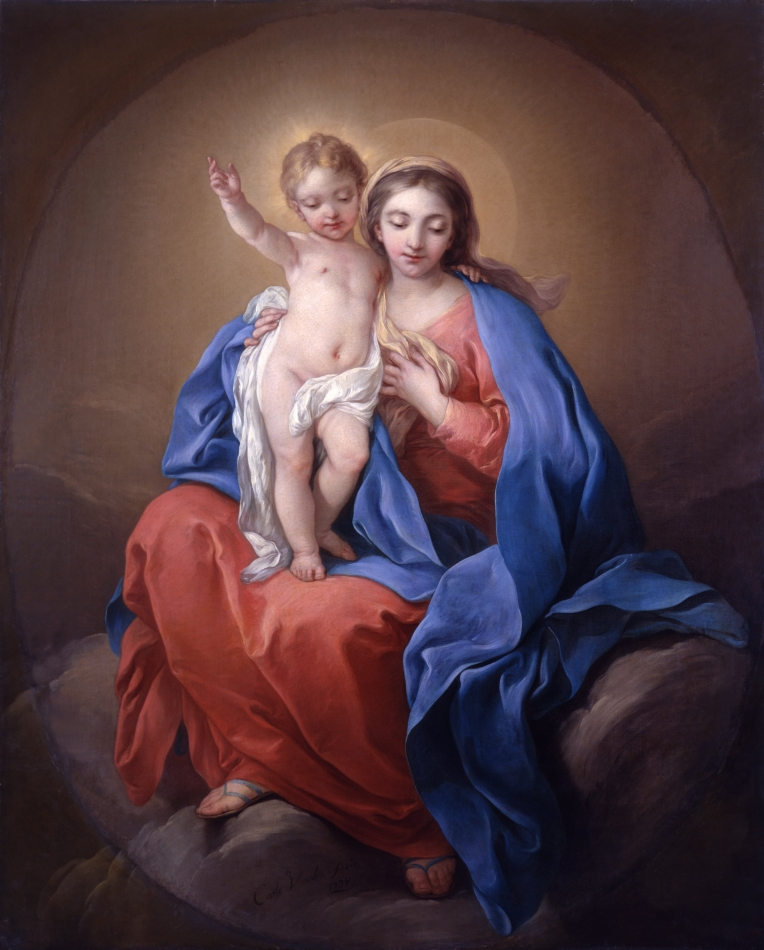
Charles-André van Loo, The Virgin, 1738

He was born in Nice, then part of the Savoyard state. Van Loo followed his brother Jean-Baptiste to Turin, and then to Rome in 1712, where he studied under Benedetto Luti and the sculptor Pierre Le Gros. After leaving Italy in 1723, he worked in Paris, studied at the Académie royale de peinture et de sculpture, where he gained first prize for drawing in 1723, and received the first prize for historical painting in 1727—as did his future rival François Boucher. In 1724 he won the Prix de Rome.

After again visiting Turin in 1727, he was employed by King Victor Amadeus II of Sardinia, for whom he painted a series of subjects illustrative of Torquato Tasso. In 1734 he settled in Paris, and in 1735 became a member of the Académie royale de peinture et de sculpture and rose rapidly in the hierarchy of the academy. Madame de Pompadour and the French court took the artist under their patronage. He was decorated with the Order of Saint Michael and named First Painter to King Louis XV in 1762. He was a most successful court painter but his portraits as well as history paintings also enjoyed an enormous success throughout all Europe. He died in Paris on 15 July 1765.

== Work ==
By his simplicity of style and correctness of design, the result of his study of the great Italian masters, he did much to purify the modern French school; but the praise that was later lavished upon his productions now appears undue and excessive. His patrons included members of the court, the Gobelins Manufactory, private individuals, and the church. In the ensuing centuries, van Loo's critical fortune has plummeted, although his ability remains admirable, and the quality and variety of his work command respect. His Marriage of the Virgin is preserved in the Louvre.

=== Paintings ===
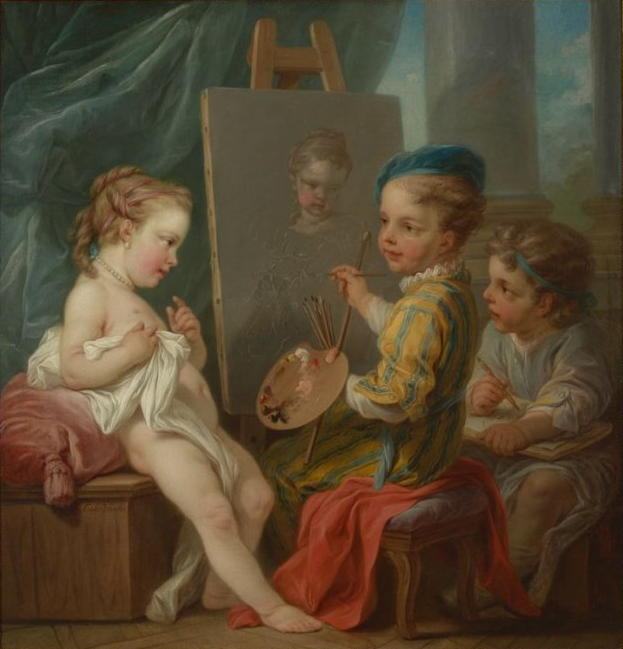
Painting, 1752-1753, Legion of Honor, San Francisco

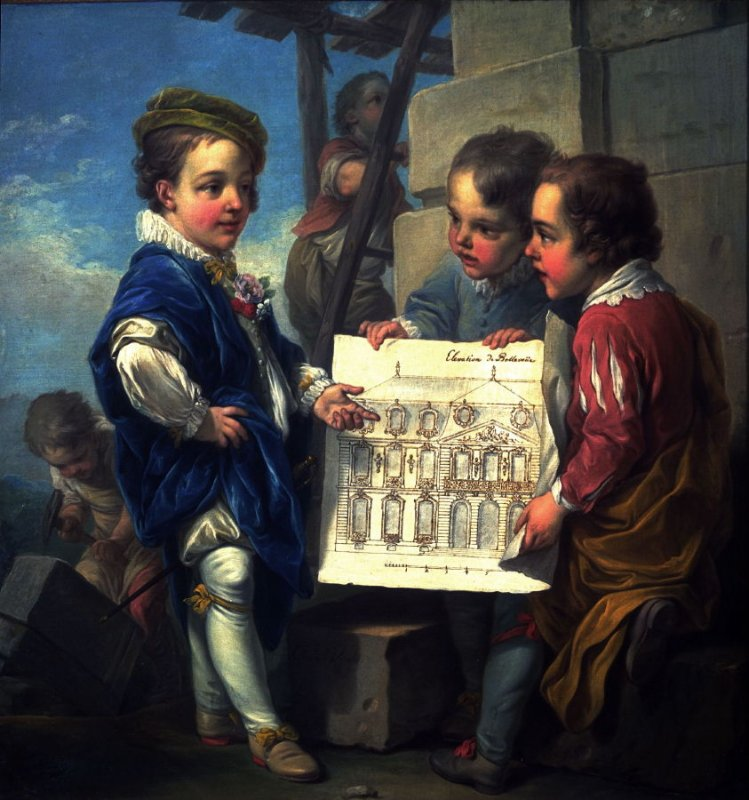
Architecture, 1752-1753, Legion of Honor, San Francisco

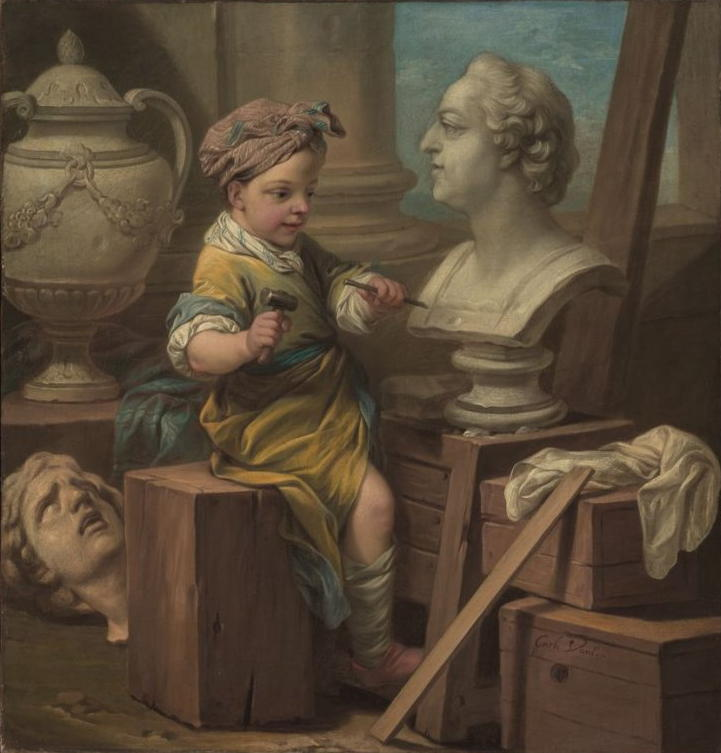
Sculpture, 1752-1753, Legion of Honor, San Francisco

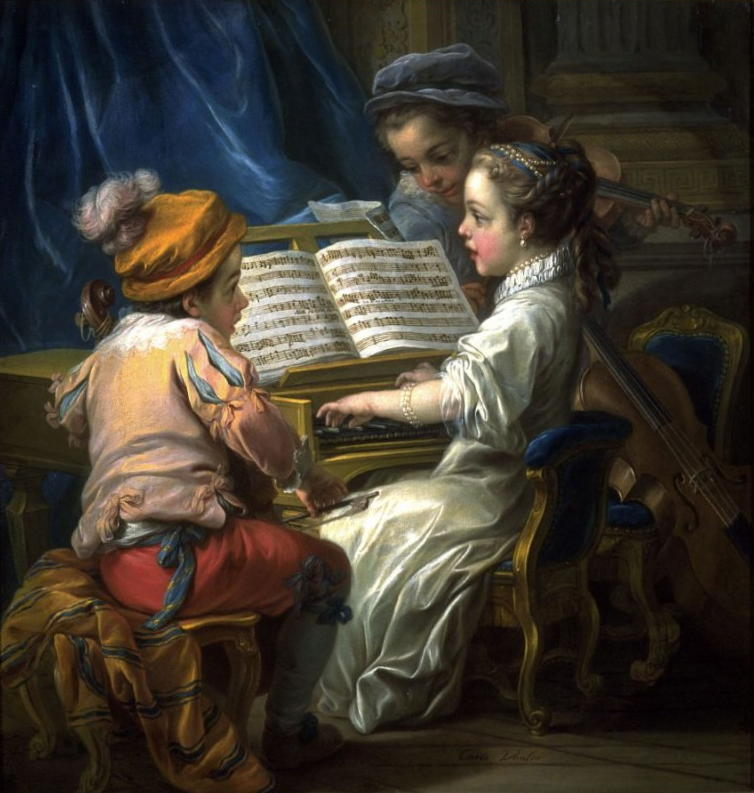
Music, 1752-1753, Legion of Honor, San Francisco

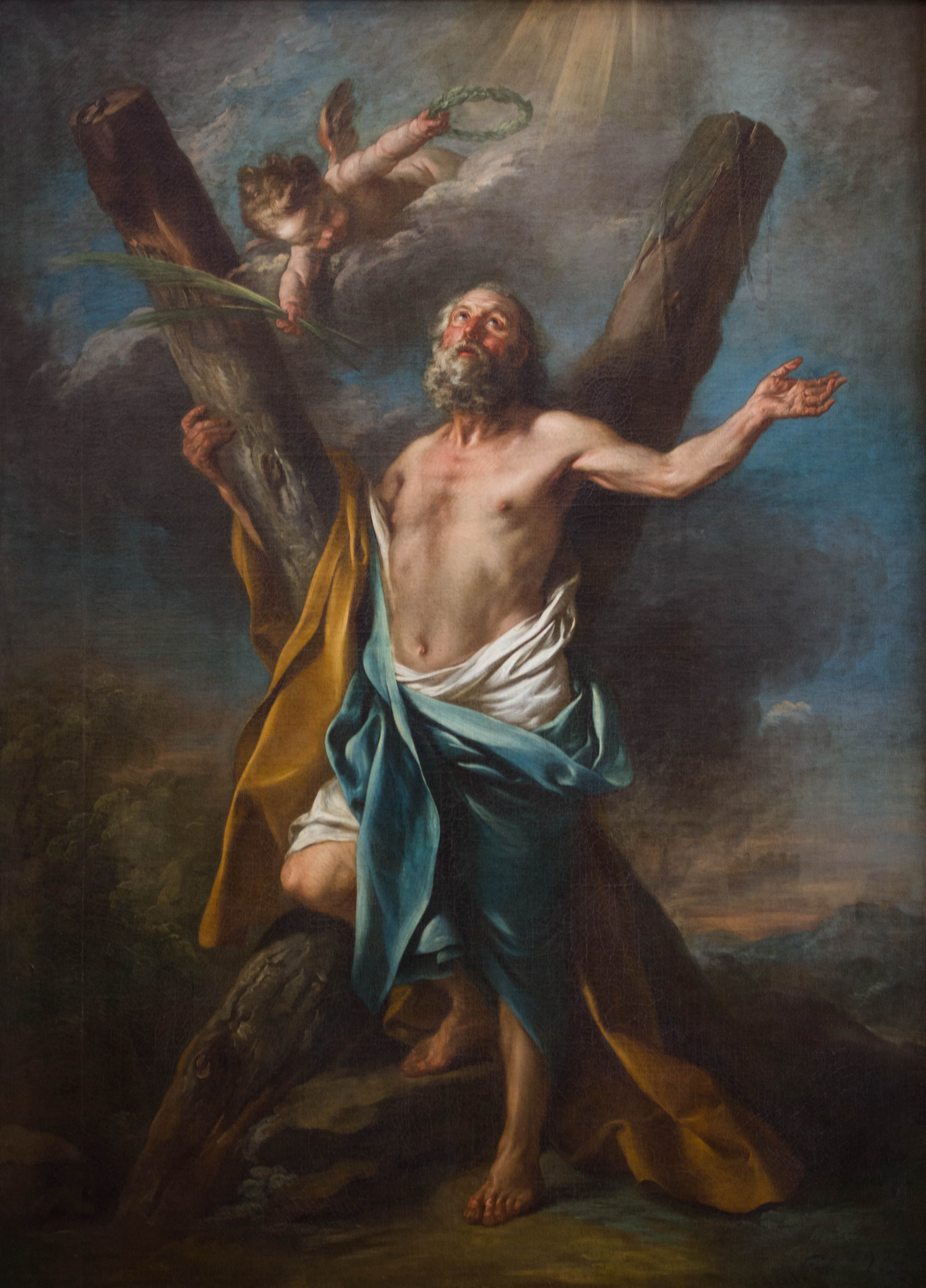
Saint Andrew

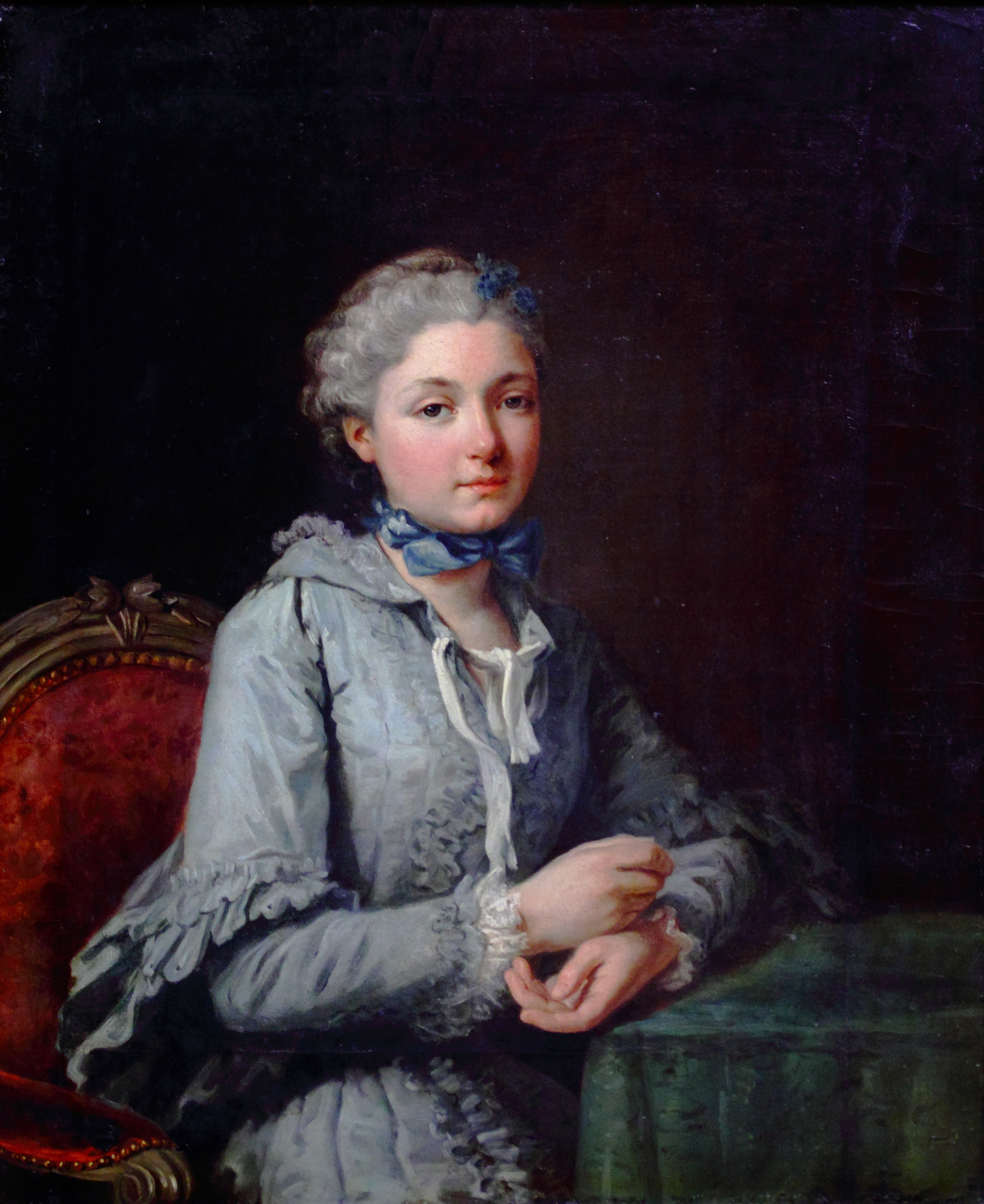
Portrait of Innocente Guillemette de Rosnyvinen de Pire, 1762

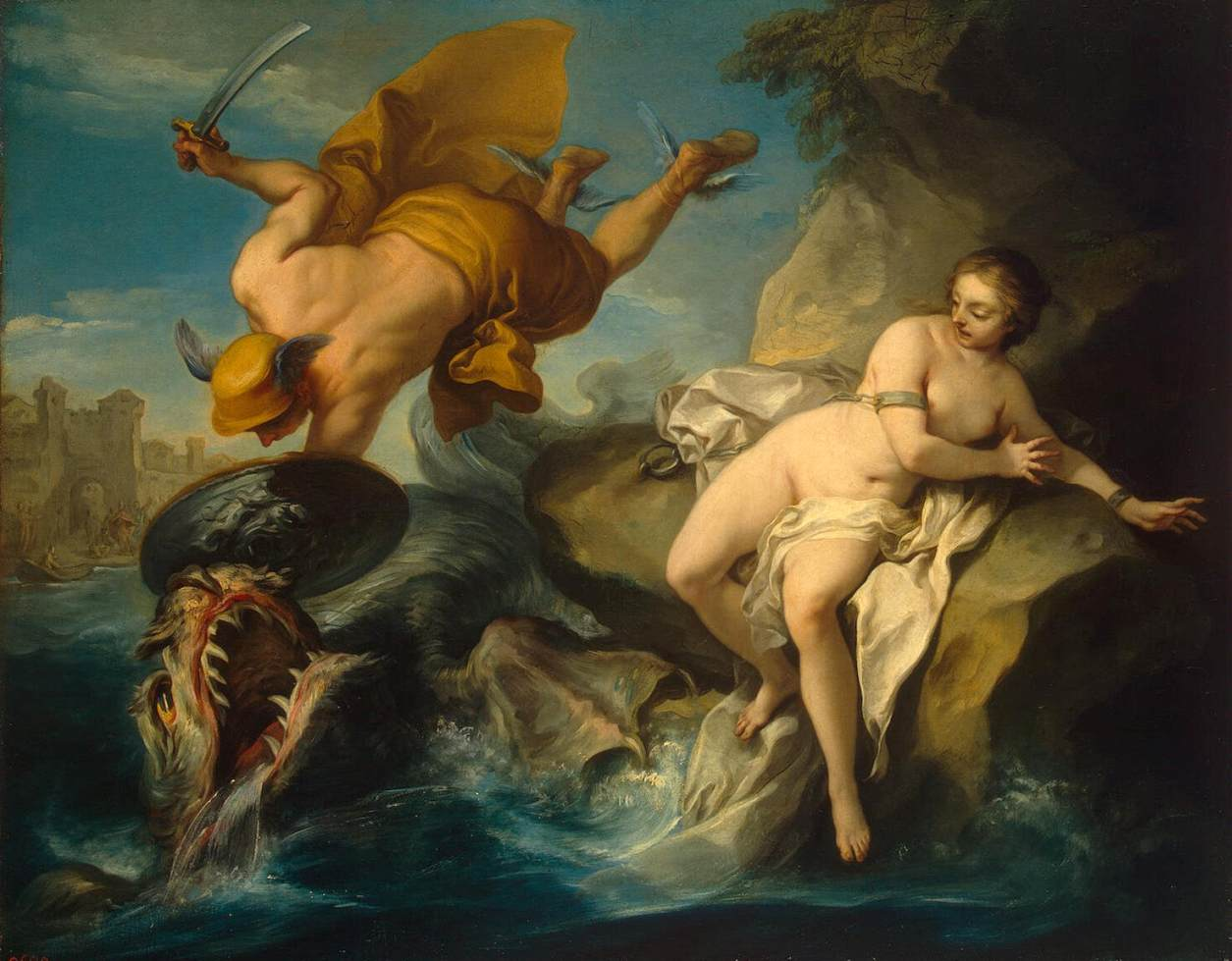
Perseus and Andromeda

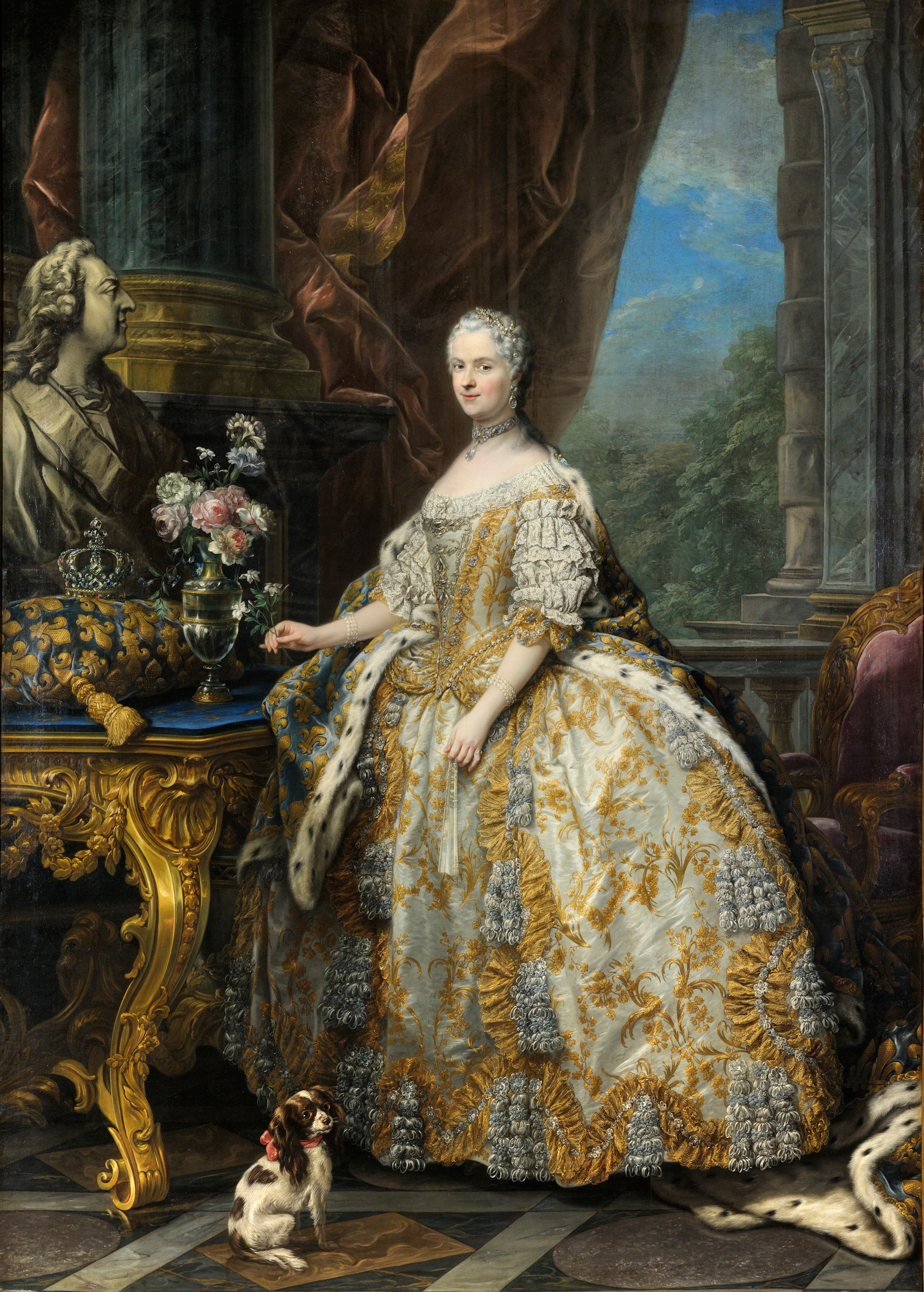
Marie Leszczyńska, Queen of France (1703-1768), 1747, Versailles

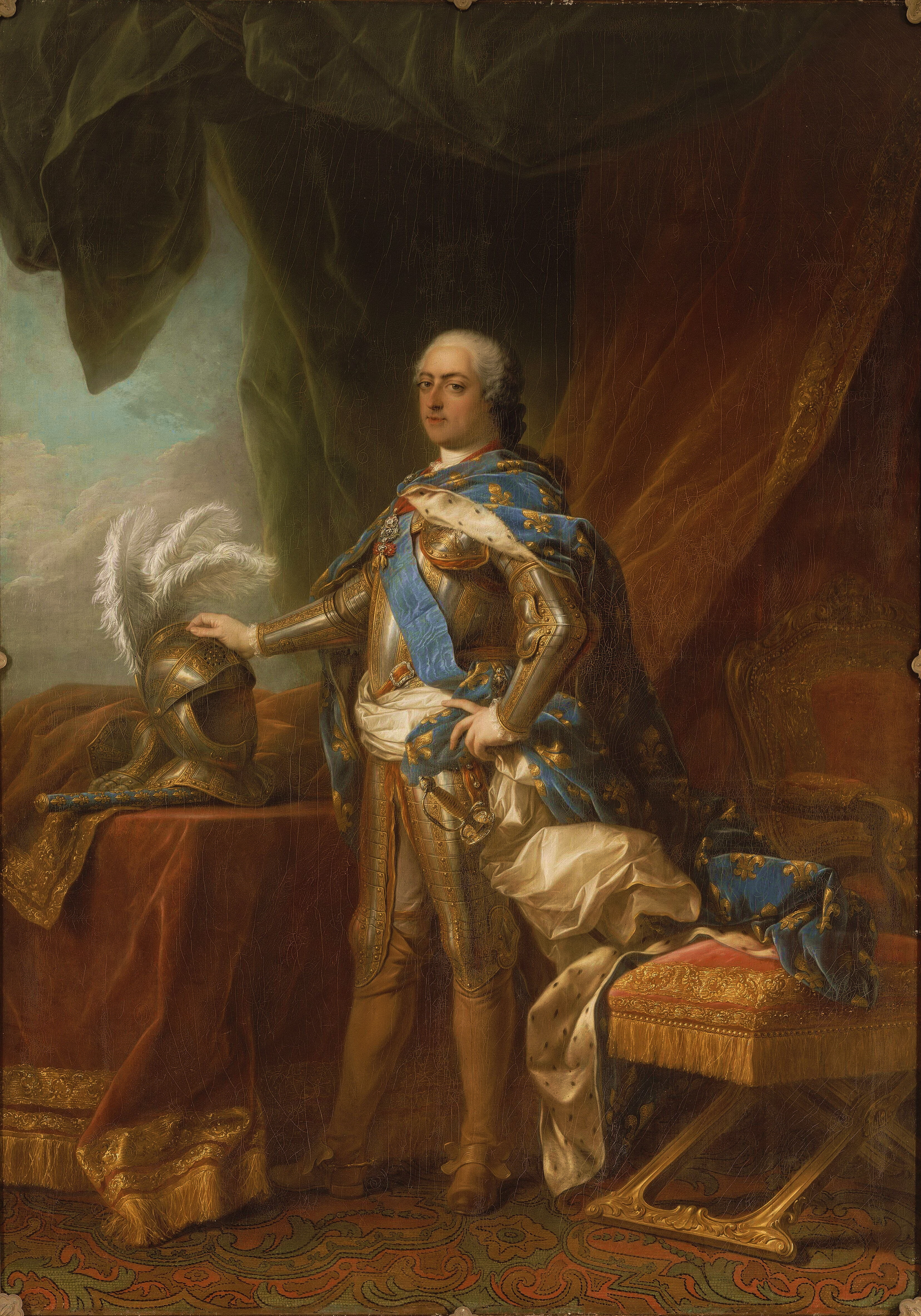
Louis XV (1710-1774)

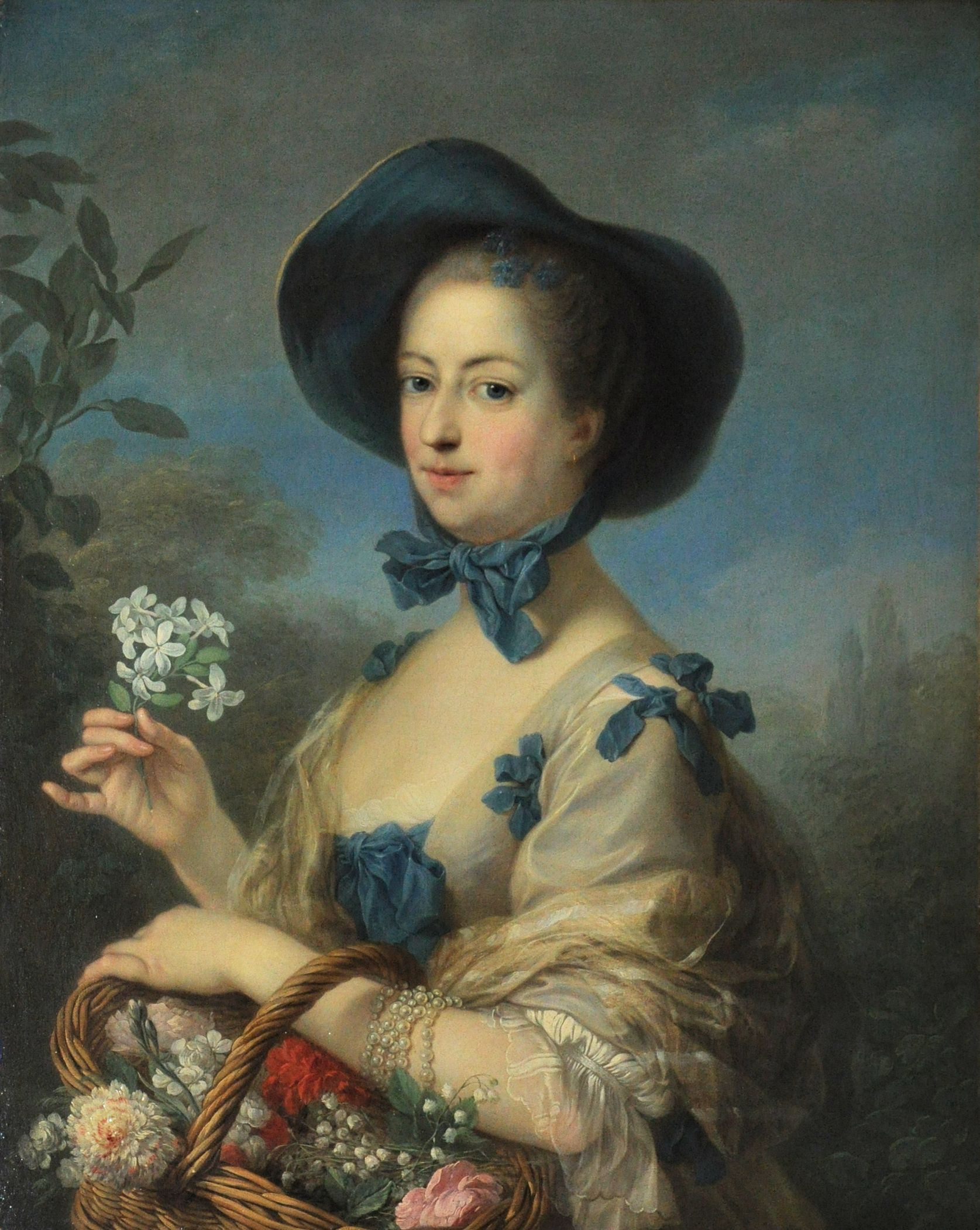
La Marquise de Pompadour, 1754-1755, Versailles, Petit Trianon

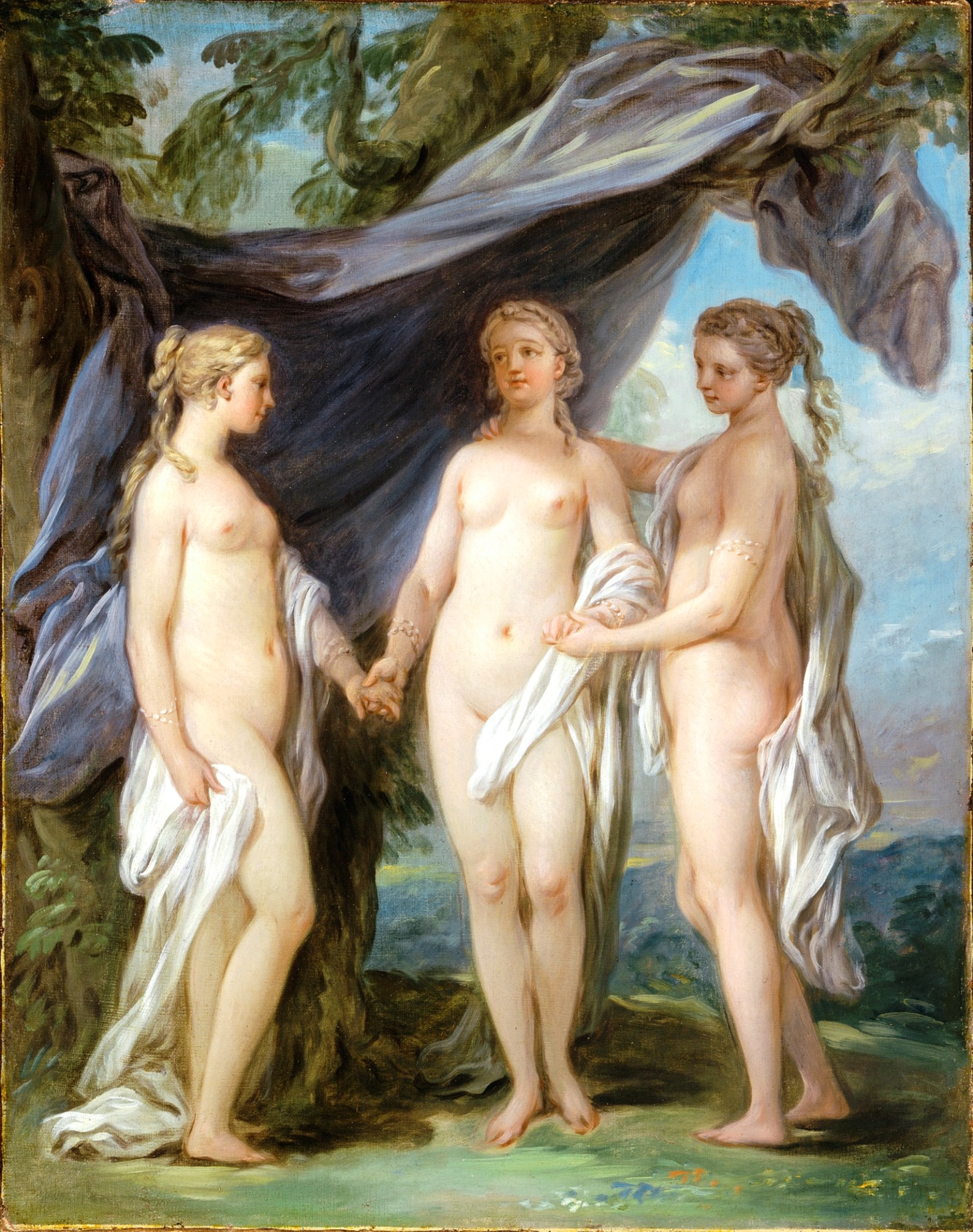
The Three Graces, 1763

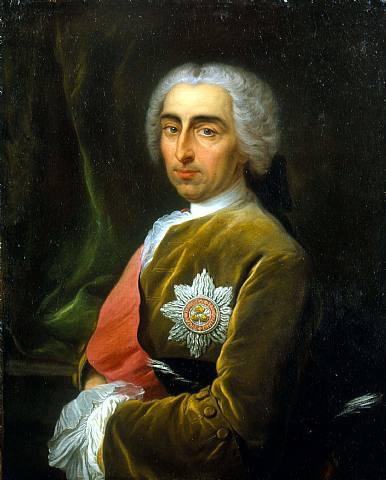
Portrait of William 1st Viscount Bateman

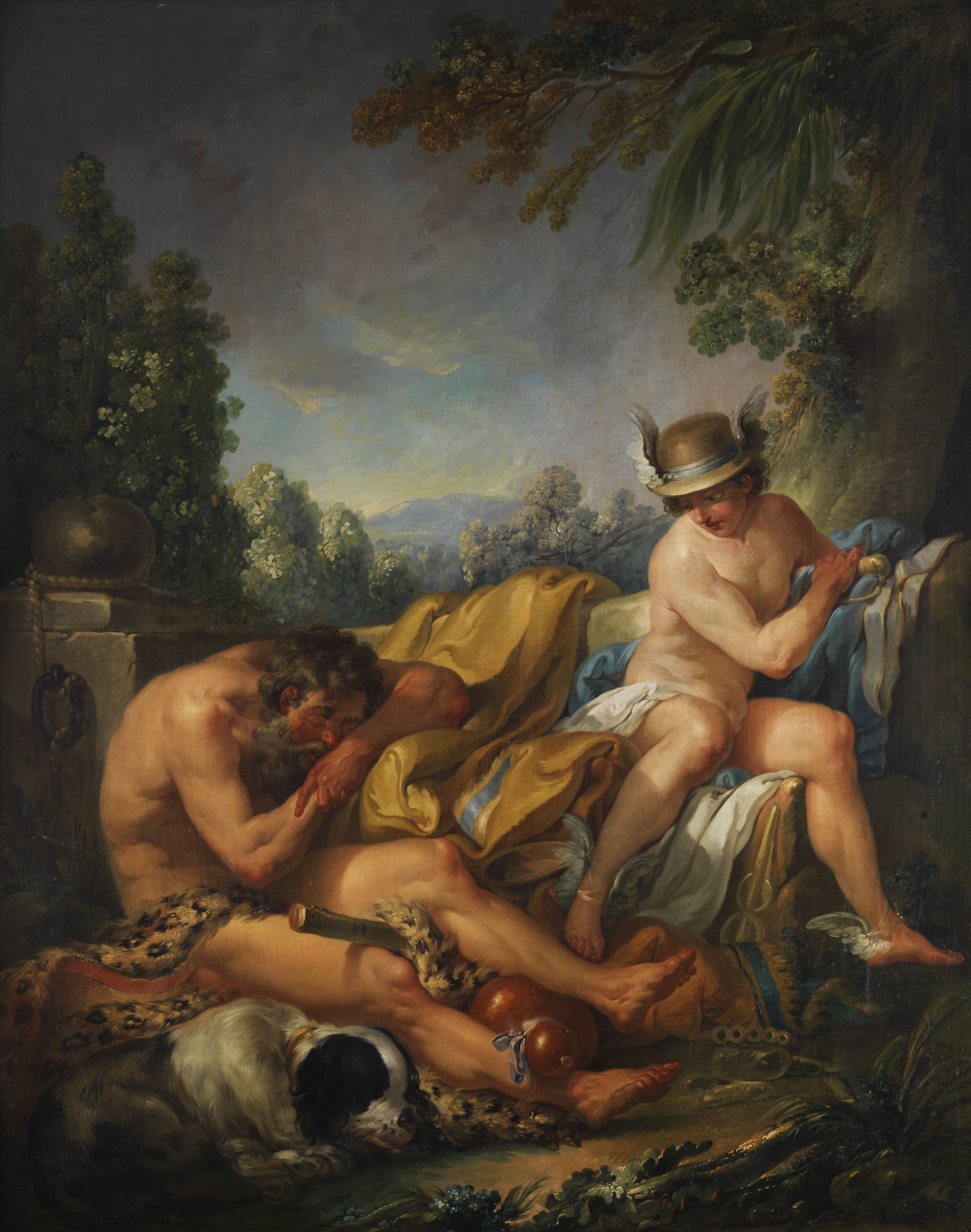
Mercury and Argus

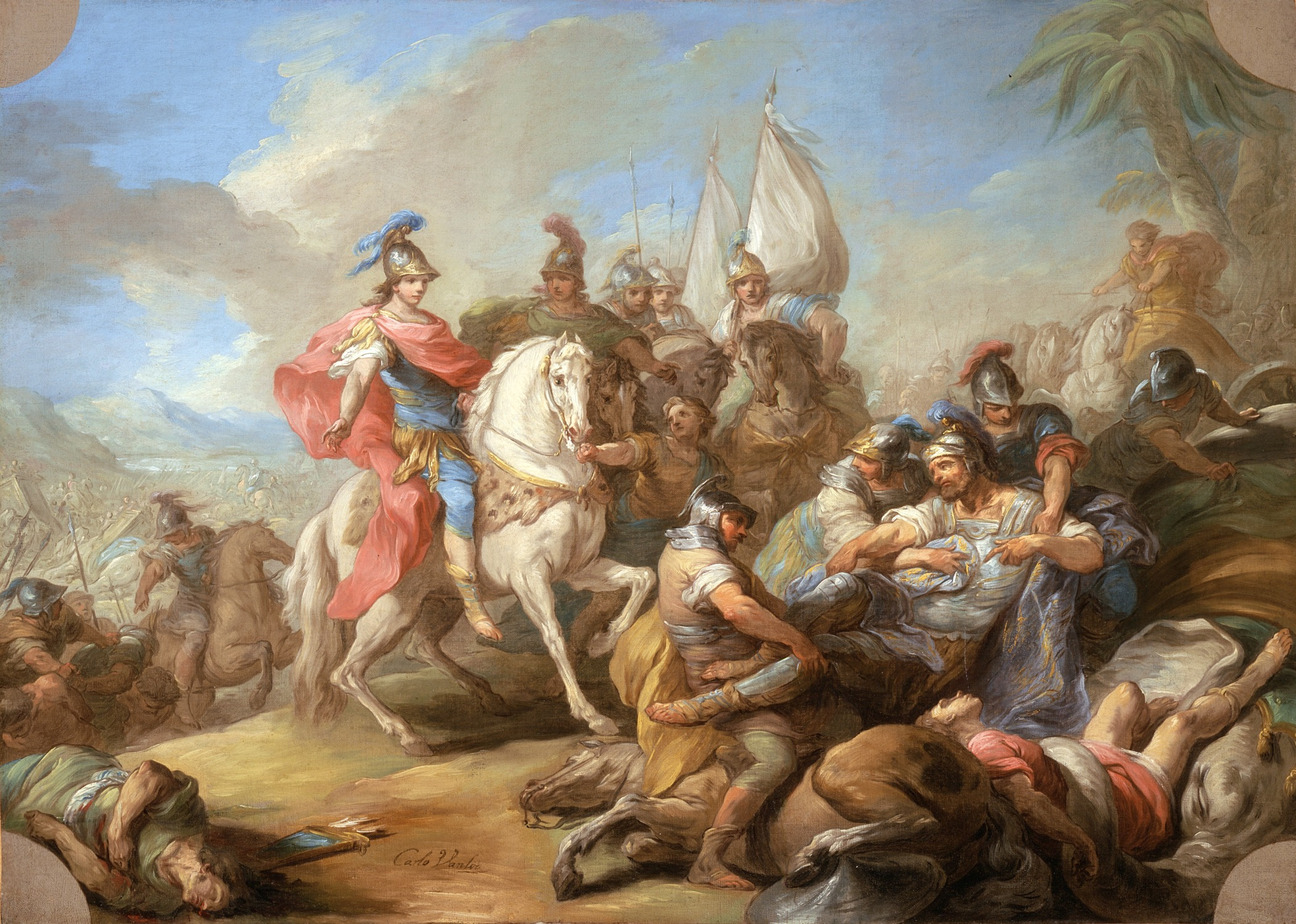
The Victory of Alexander over Porus

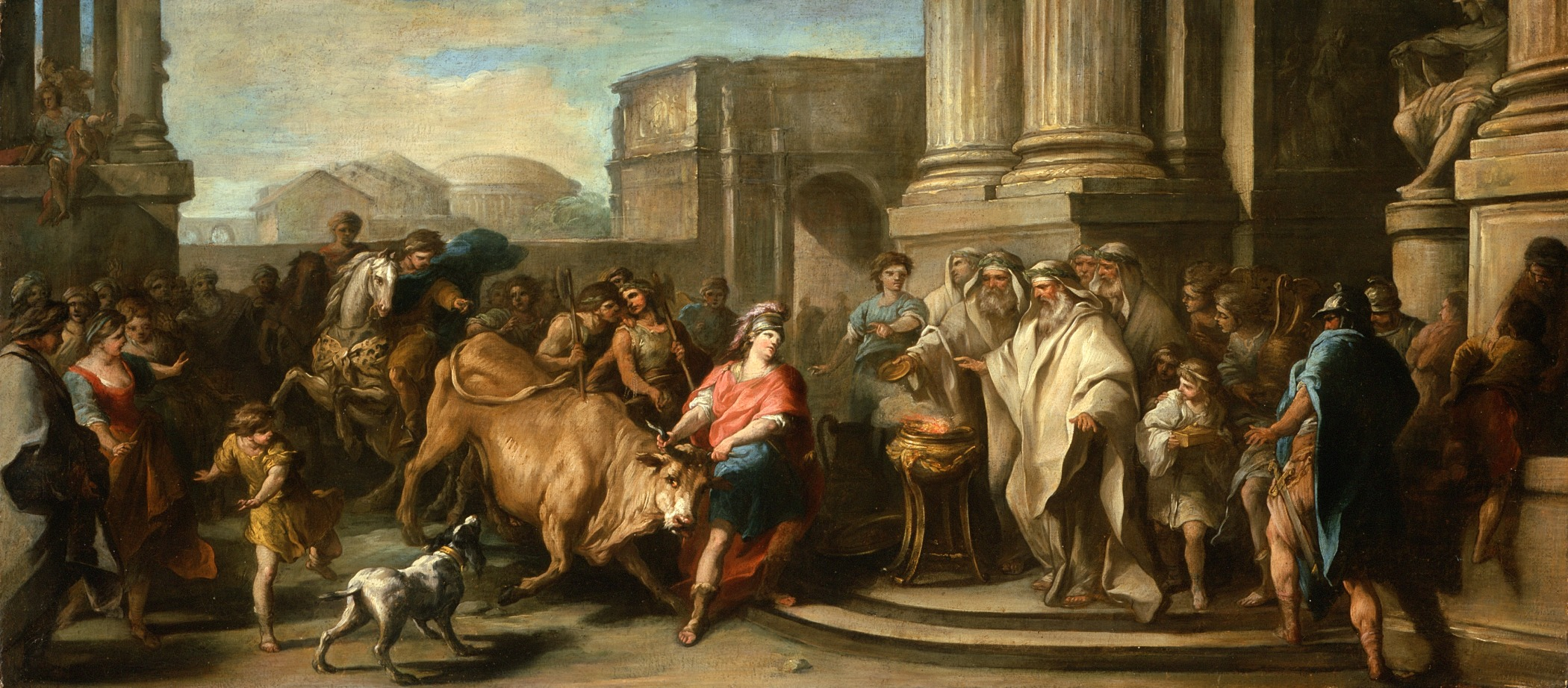
Theseus Taming the Bull of Marathon

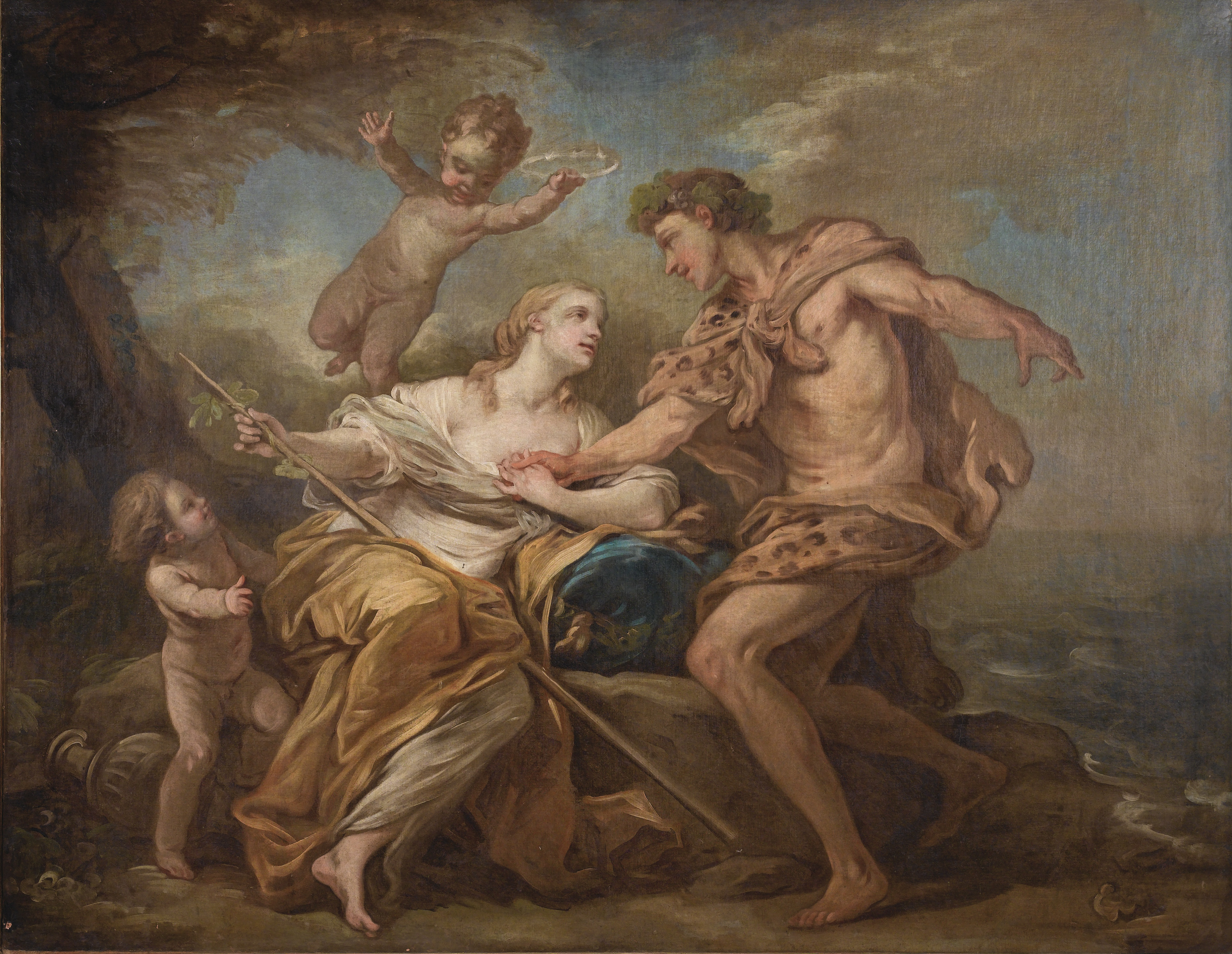
Baccus et Ariane

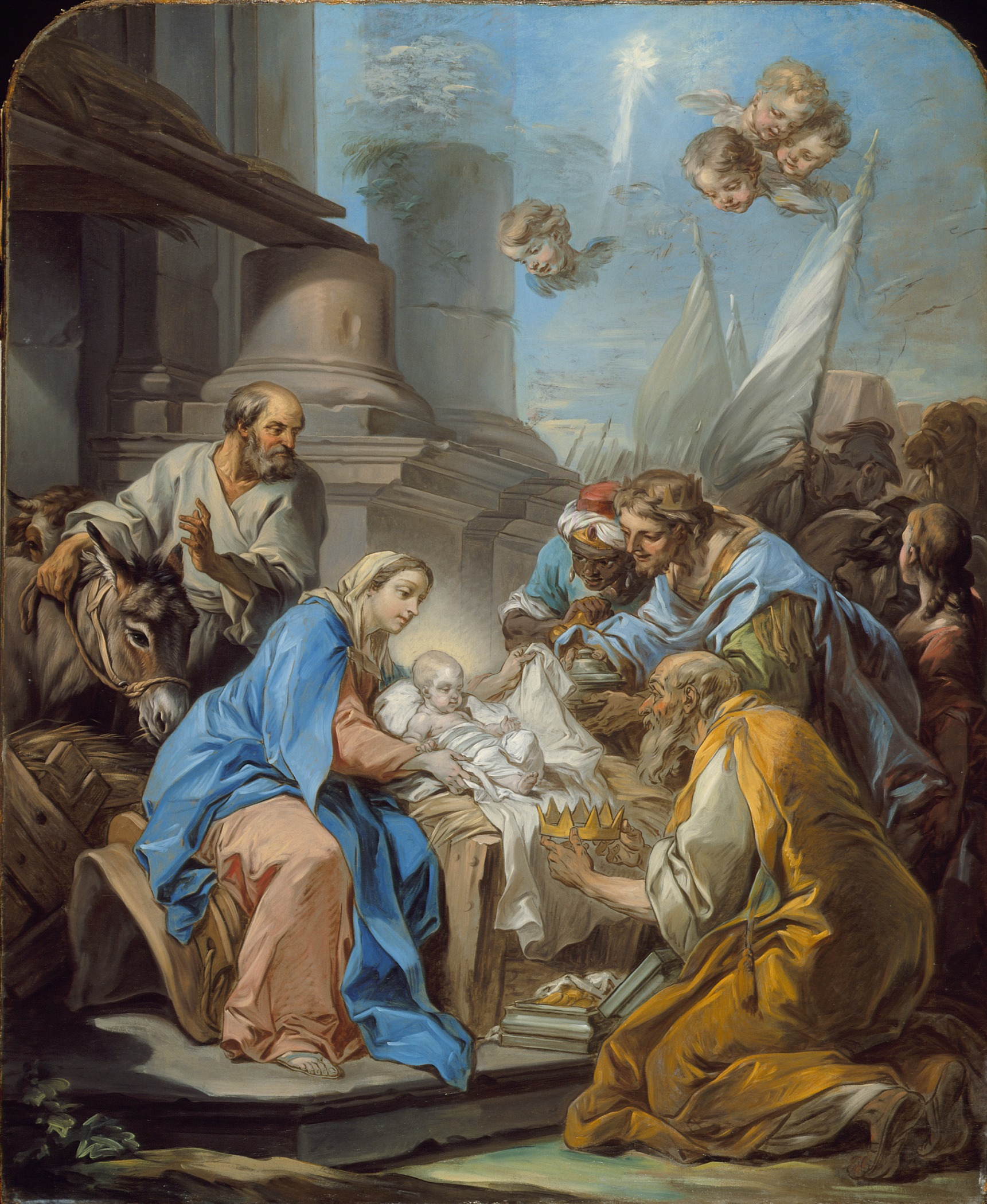
The Adoration of the Magi

== Sources ==
- "Ванло или ван-Ло, художники" . Brockhaus and Efron Encyclopedic Dictionary (in Russian). 1906.
- "Loo, Charles André, Called Carle van". Benezit Dictionary of Artists. 2011.
