= 1806 in art =

Events in the year 1806 in art.

== Events ==
- 18 January – The British Institution opens the former Boydell Shakespeare Gallery in Pall Mall, London, as the "British Gallery", alternating the world's first regular temporary exhibitions of Old Master paintings with sale exhibitions of the work of living artists.
- 5 May – The Royal Academy Exhibition of 1806 opens at Somerset House in London.

== Works ==
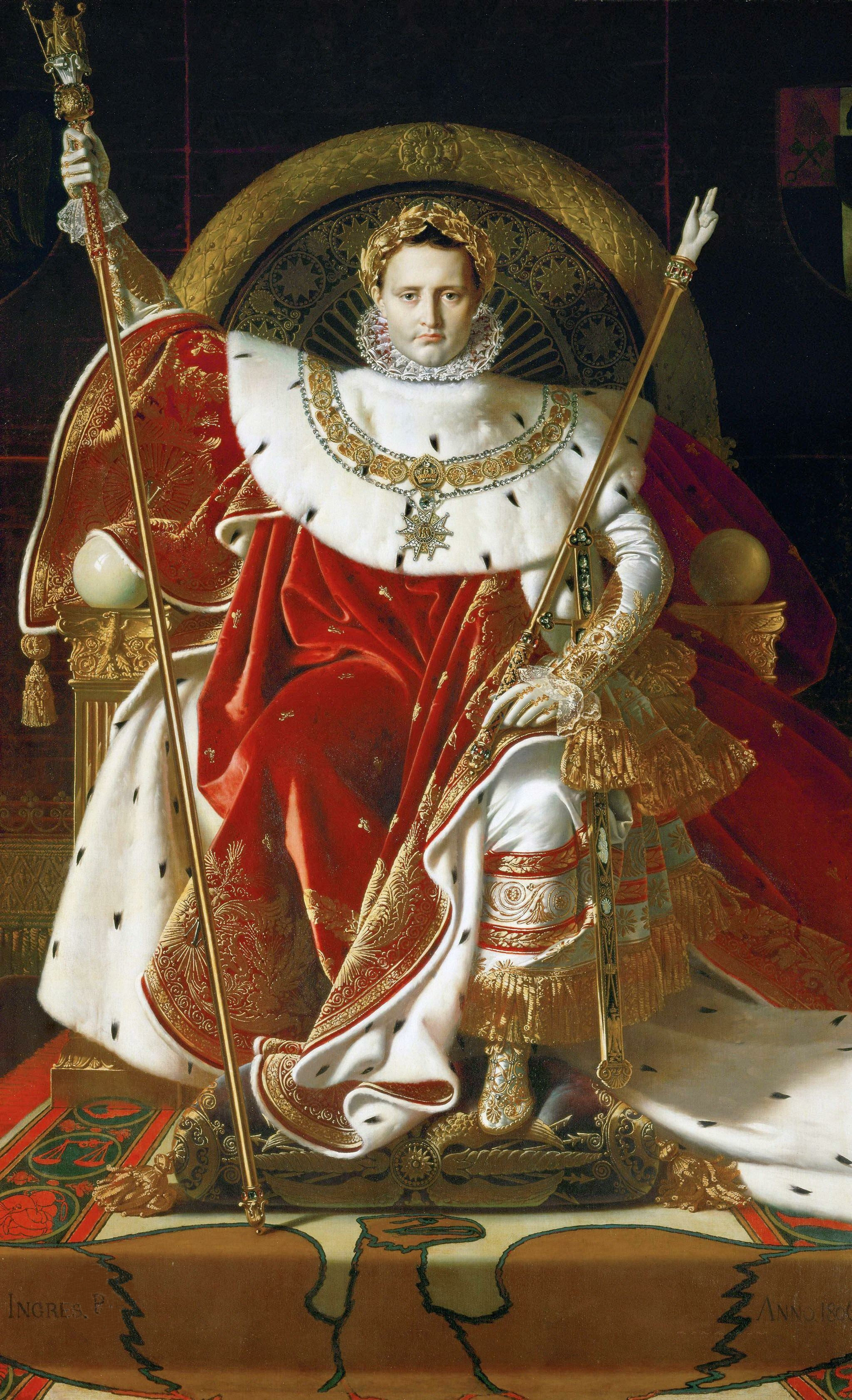
Jean Auguste Dominique Ingres, Napoleon on his Imperial Throne, 1806, oil on canvas, 260 x 163 cm, Musée de l'Armée, Paris

- Antonio Canova – Napoleon as Mars the Peacemaker (bronze nude)
- John Constable – Portrait of Abram Constable
- Marguerite Gérard – The Clemency of Napoleon
- Anne-Louis Girodet de Roussy-Trioson – Charles-Marie Bonaparte
- Jean-Antoine Houdon – Portrait bust of Napoleon
- Jean Auguste Dominique Ingres
  - La Belle Zélie
  - Mademoiselle Caroline Rivière
  - Napoleon I on his Imperial Throne
- Thomas Lawrence – Portrait of Lord Westmoreland
- Marie-Françoise-Constance Mayer – The Sleep of Venus and Cupid
- Henry Raeburn – Lord Newton (approximate date)
- Philipp Otto Runge – The Hülsenbeck Children
- Joseph Karl Stieler – Self-portrait
- Benjamin West
  - The Death of Nelson
  - The Fatal Wounding of Sir Philip Sidney
  - Portrait of Robert Fulton
  - Thetis Bringing the Armor to Achilles (second version)
- David Wilkie
  - The Blind Fiddler
  - King Alfred burning the cakes

== Births ==
- 10 January – Louis Joseph César Ducornet, French painter (used his feet) (died 1856)
- 13 January – Eugen Napoleon Neureuther, German painter and illustrator (died 1882)
- 25 January – Daniel Maclise, Irish-born painter (died 1882)
- 1 February – George Harvey, Scottish genre painter (died 1876)
- 22 February – Antoine Wiertz, Belgian painter (died 1865)
- 8 March – Antonio María Esquivel, Spanish Romantic painter (died 1857)
- 12 April – Peter Rindisbacher, Swiss-born anthropological painter (died 1834)
- 2 May – Marc-Charles-Gabriel Gleyre, Swiss painter (born 1874)
- 4 June – Daniel Macnee, Scottish portrait painter (died 1882)
- 11 June – James Ballantine, Scottish painter and author (died 1877)
- 28 July – Alexander Andreyevich Ivanov, Russian painter who adhered to Neoclassicism (died 1858)
- 19 September – William Dyce, Scottish-born painter (died 1864)
- 24 September – Niels Christian Kierkegaard, Danish draftsman and lithographer (died 1882)
- October (10 or 12) – David Scott, Scottish historical painter (died 1849)

== Deaths ==
- 6 January – Jean Henri Riesener, German furniture designer (born 1734)
- 22 February – James Barry, Irish painter, one of the earliest Romantic painters working in Britain (born 1741)
- 17 March – Rienk Jelgerhuis, Dutch painter, engraver and draftsman (born 1729)
- 8 April – Robert Barker, itinerant portrait painter (born 1739)
- 26 April – Václav Bernard Ambrosi, Czech miniature painter (born 1723)
- 20 April – John Russell, English portrait painter (born 1745)
- 5 June – Gabriel François Doyen, French painter (born 1726)
- 3 July – Carlo Magini, Italian painter of the Baroque period (born 1720)
- 10 July – George Stubbs, British painter, best known for his paintings of horses (born 1724)
- 22 August – Jean-Honoré Fragonard, French painter and printmaker (born 1732)
- 23 August – Johann Eleazar Zeissig, German genre, portrait and porcelain painter, and engraver (born 1737)
- 9 October – Friedrich August Brand, Austrian painter and engraver of historical subjects and landscapes (born 1735)
- 10 October – Therese Maron, German painter active in Rome (born 1725)
- 22 October – Thomas Sheraton, English furniture designer (born 1751)
- 31 October – Utamaro, Japanese printmaker and painter, especially of woodblock prints (ukiyo-e) (born 1753)
- date unknown
  - Ezekiel Abraham Ezekiel, English engraver (born 1757)
  - Henry Pelham, American painter, engraver, and cartographer (born 1748/1749) (drowned)
  - Johann Dallinger von Dalling, Austrian painter (born 1741)
- probable – Danwon, Korean painter of the late Joseon period (born 1745)
