= Alexandre-Évariste Fragonard =

French painter and sculptor (1780–1850)

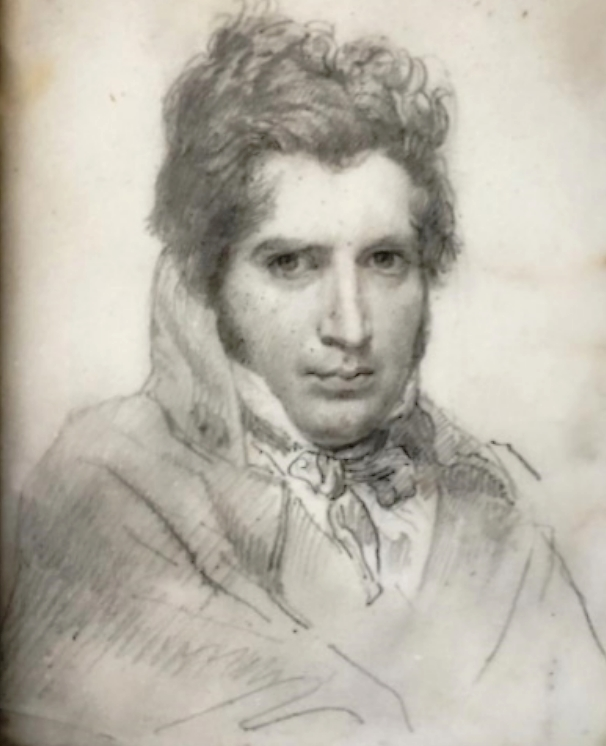
- Self-portrait, c. 1815
- Born: 26 October 1780; Grasse, France
- Died: 10 November 1850 (aged 70); Paris, France
- Education: Fragonard, David
- Known for: Painting, sculpting
- Movement: Troubadour style

Alexandre-Évariste Fragonard (French pronunciation: [alɛksɑ̃dʁ evaʁist fʁaɡɔnaʁ]; 26 October 1780 – 10 November 1850) was a French painter and sculptor in the troubadour style. He received his first training from his father and drew from him his piquant subjects and great facility, perfecting them under Jacques-Louis David. His parents were Jean-Honoré Fragonard and Marie-Anne Fragonard.

He was born in Grasse, and died in Paris.

== Works ==
His paintings include:

- Francis I Armed as a Knight
- Francis I Receiving Primaticcio (ceiling of the Louvre)
- Joan of Arc Climbing to the Stake
- Tasso Reading Jerusalem Delivered
- Francis I at Marignan
- Mirabeau Replying to Dreux-Brézé

As a sculptor, he produced the old pediment of the Chambre des Députés and a colossal statue of Pichegru.

He designed an engraving called the Interior of a Revolutionary Committee under the Terror, which was engraved by Pierre-Gabriel Berthault and Claude Nicolas Malapeau in 1802.

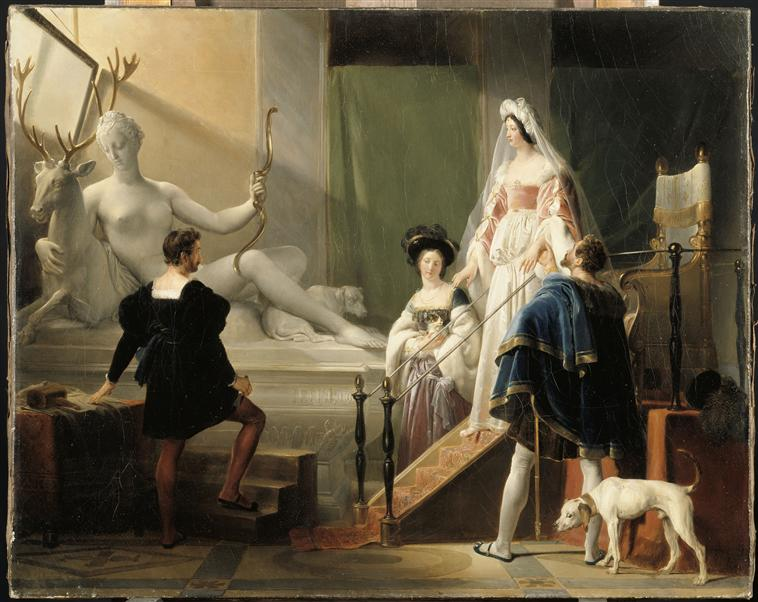
Diane de Poitiers in the studio of Jean Goujon, 1825

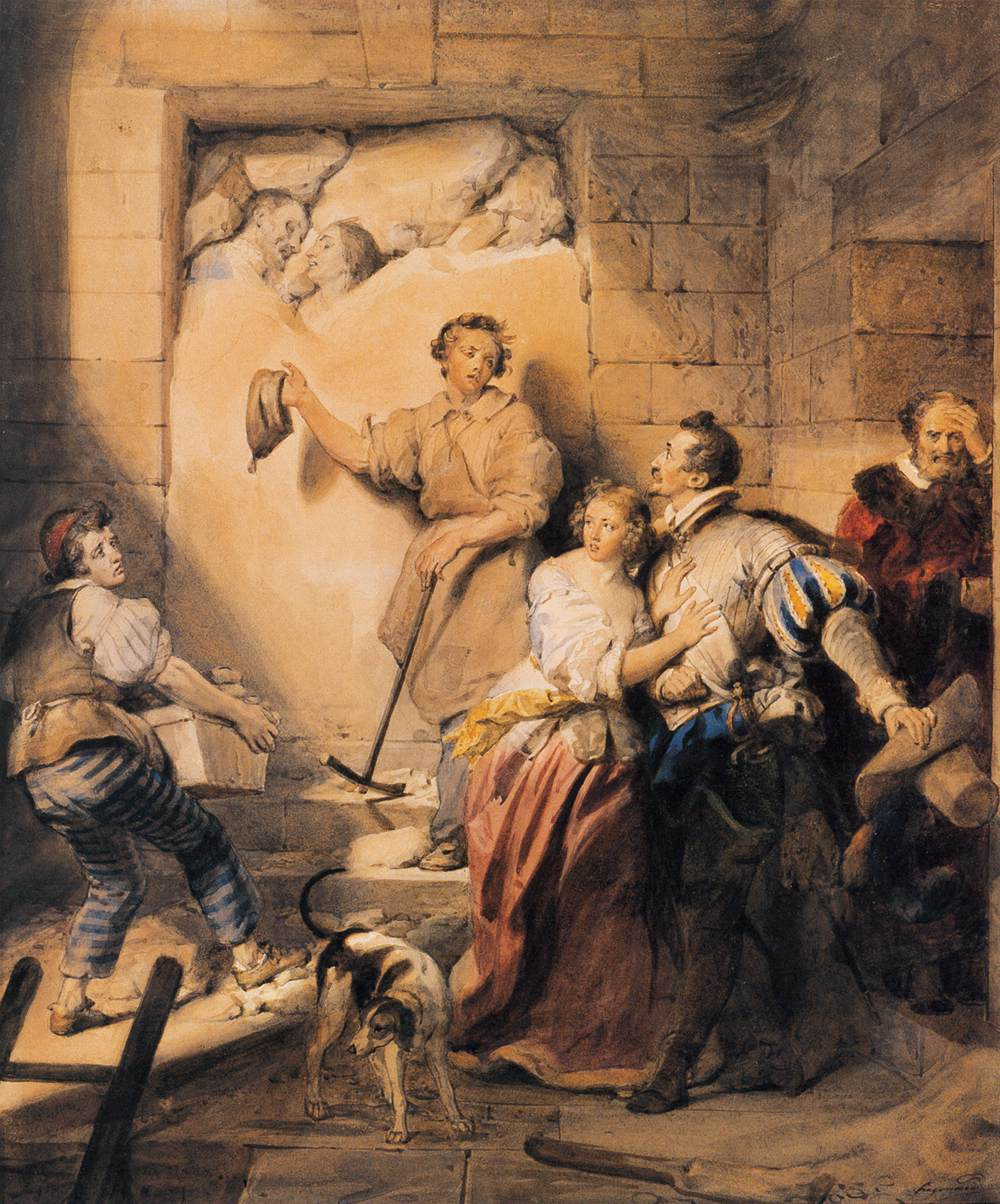
The Immured based on the legend of the Château du Bousquet, recorded in the Chronicle of the House of Roquefeuil (1926) by Colonel Daupeyroux which tells of a lord who walled up his daughter and a neighbor lover over an illicit affair

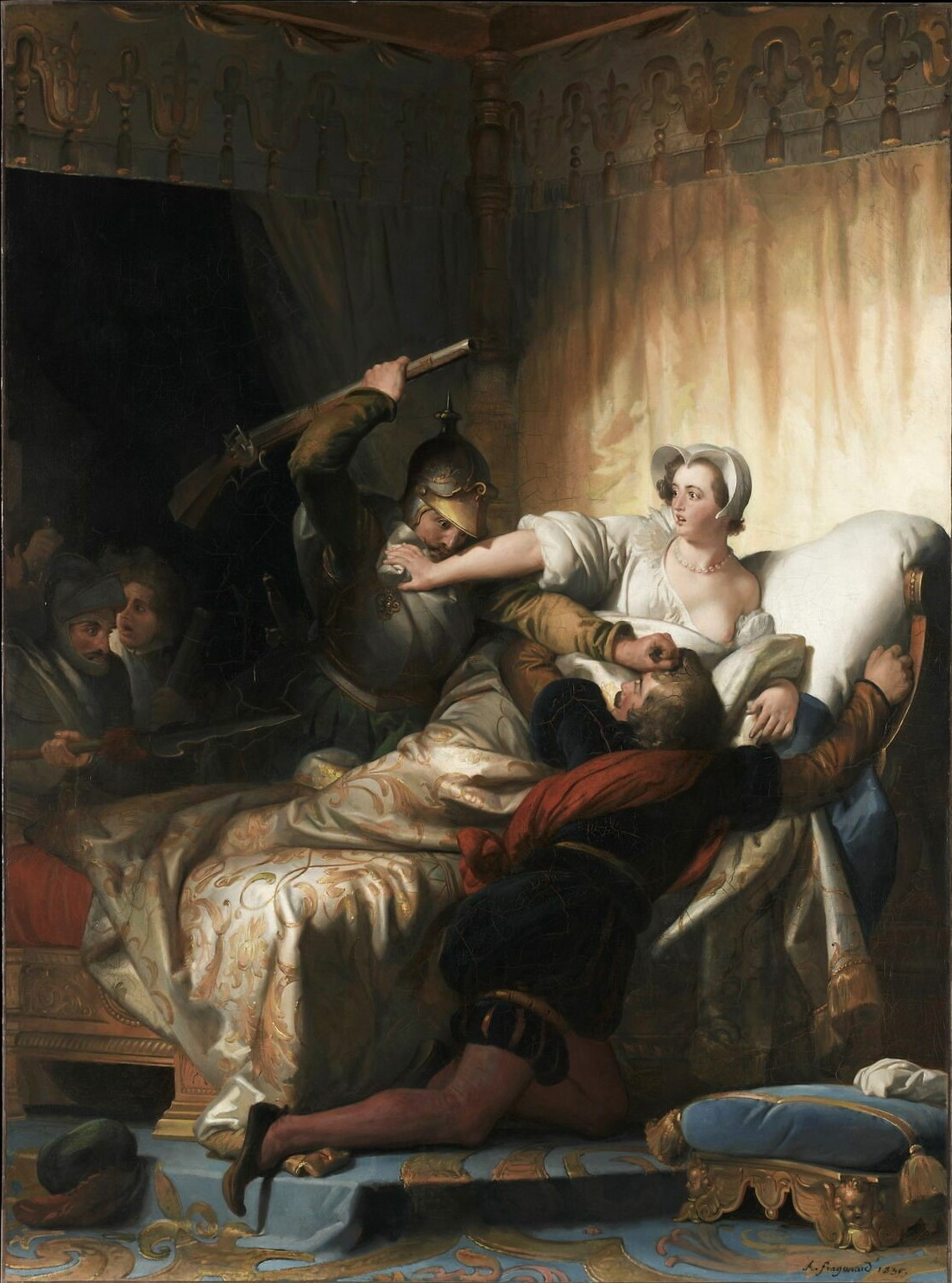
Scene in the bedroom of Marguerite of Valois during the night of Saint Bartholomew, 1836, Musée du Louvre, Paris
