= Portrait of Marie-Françoise Rivière =

Painting by Jean-Auguste-Dominique Ingres

'Portrait of Marie-Françoise Rivière by Ingres, 1805, oval, 115.5 x 90.2 cm. Louvre, Paris

Portrait of Marie-Françoise Rivière (also known as Portrait of Madame Rivière, or la Femme au châle) is a c. 1805 oil-on-canvas painting by the French Neoclassical artist Jean-Auguste-Dominique Ingres.

Madame Rivière, born Marie-Françoise-Jacquette-Bibiane Blot de Beauregard, and known as Sabine, married Philibert Rivière de L'Isle, an influential court official in the Napoleonic Empire, who commissioned this work, along with portraits of himself and their daughter, Caroline.

The painting is composed from white, chilly blue, beige and ochre colours. It has an overall, deliberately flat and shadow-less appearance. The portrait has been described as having "an ambiance of female voluptuousness, [and] pampered femininity". Seated on a blue cushion or sofa, Sabine, then in her mid-30s, wears a low-cut and wide necked prom dress, with a high waist and short sleeves, a cream colored chiffon, and a cashmere shawl. He black hair is arranged in curls. The painting shocked critics when exhibited at the Salon of 1806, particularly they were perplexed at the illogical and unnatural anatomy. A point of focus was her deliberately elongated right arm. The technique however was to become a hallmark on Ingres' female portraits, in this case the arm is lengthened to rhyme with the curve of the oval frame.

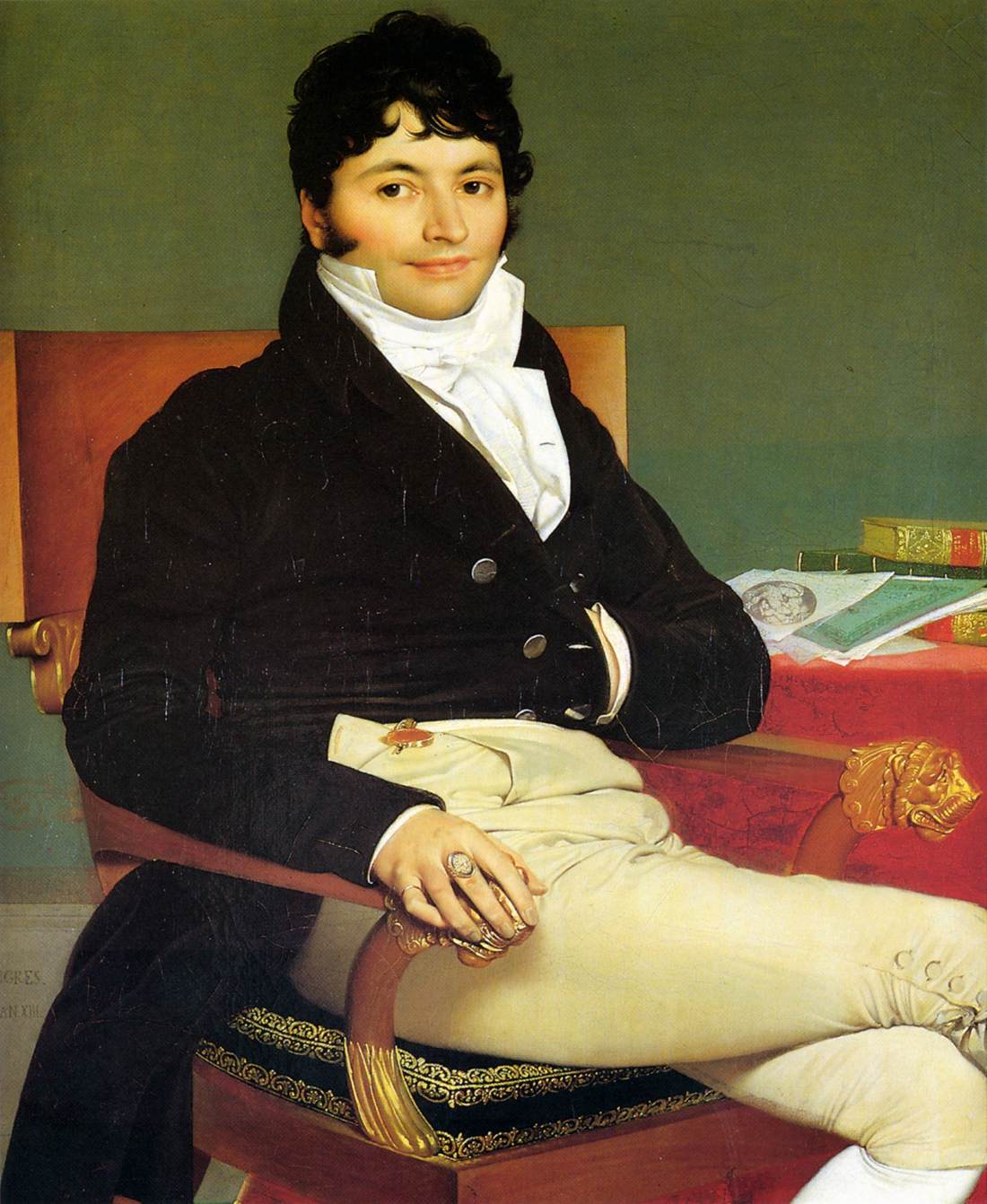
Portrait of Philibert Rivière, 1805

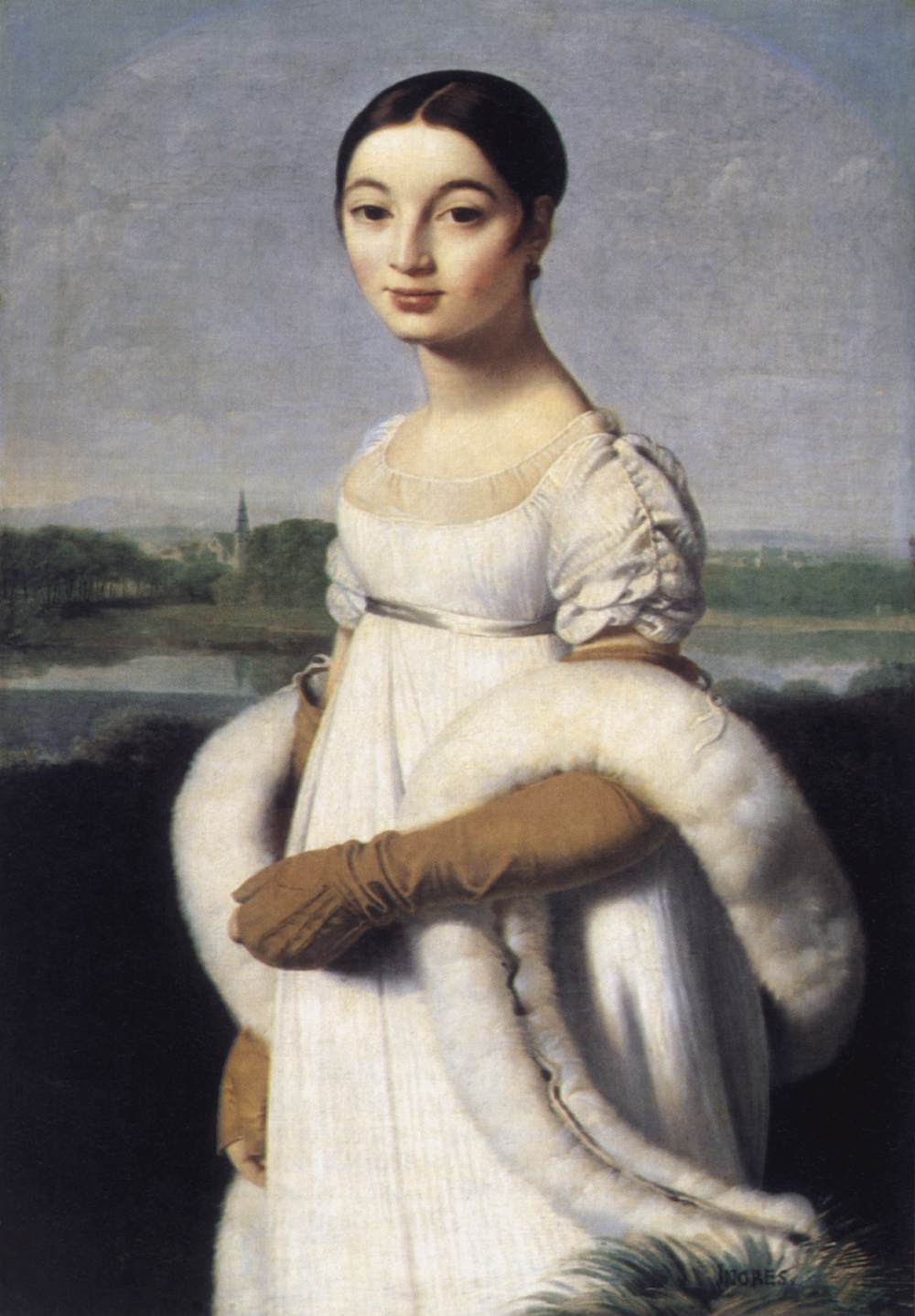
Mademoiselle Caroline Rivière, 1806

There has been speculation as to why their son Paul was not portrayed and the background to the commission is unclear. Philibert Rivière was likely impressed by the painter's 1804 Bonaparte, First Consul; his own portrait echoes the emperor's pose. Unusually for Ingres, no preparatory drawings are known. Ingres' never saw the three Rivière paintings after the 1808 Salon, he tried to find and reunite them for an 1855 exhibition, but all the sitters had died (Caroline in 1807, Philibert in 1816, and Sabine in 1848), and could not determine the location of the canvasses. As it turned out they had been in the Paris collection of Paul Rivière. They were eventually bequeathed to the nation in 1870, three years after Ingres' own death.

== See also ==
- List of paintings by Jean-Auguste-Dominique Ingres

== Sources ==
- Rosenblum, Robert. Ingres. London: Harry N. Abrams, 1990. ISBN 978-0-300-08653-9
- Conisbee, Philip. Portraits by Ingres: Image of an Epoch. New York: Metropolitan Museum of Art, 1999. ISBN 978-0-300-08653-9
