= Marguerite Gérard =

French artist (1761–1837)

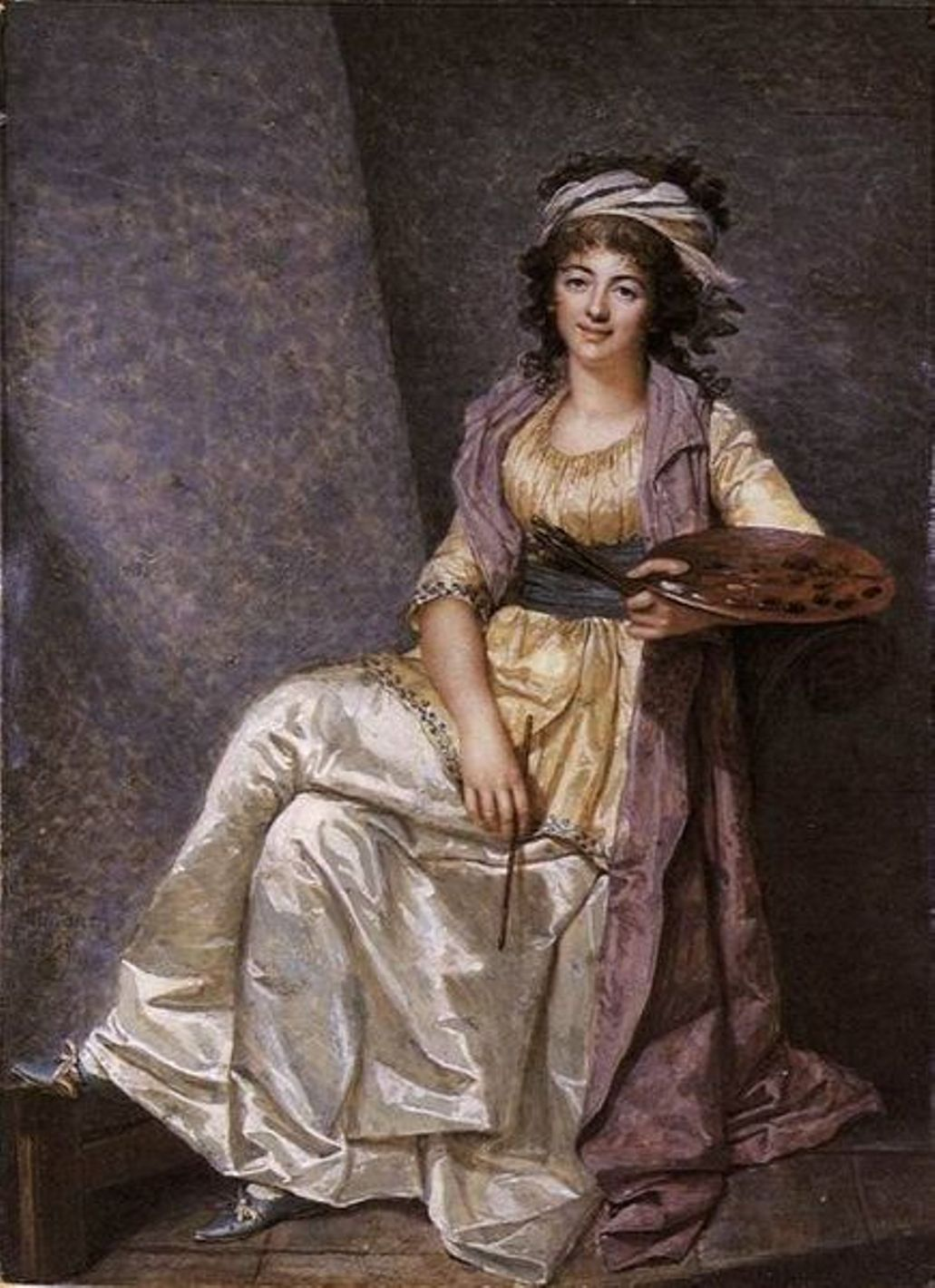
- Marguerite Gérard, by François Dumont
- Born: 28 January 1761; Grasse, Kingdom of France
- Died: 18 May 1837 (aged 76); Paris, Kingdom of France
- Known for: Painting, etching
- Style: Rococo; Pre-romanticism
- Relatives: Marie-Anne Fragonard (elder sister); Jean-Honoré Fragonard (brother-in-law)

Marguerite Gérard (French pronunciation: [maʁɡəʁit ʒeʁaʁ]; 28 January 1761 in Grasse – 18 May 1837 in Paris) was a French painter and printmaker working in the Rococo style. She was the daughter of Marie Gilette and perfumer Claude Gérard. At eight years old, she became the sister-in-law of Jean-Honoré Fragonard, and when she was 14, she went to live with him. She was also the aunt of the artist Alexandre-Évariste Fragonard. Gérard became Fragonard's pupil in the mid-1770s and studied painting, drawing and printmaking under his tutelage. Gérard and Fragonard created nine etchings in 1778. Historians currently believe Gérard was the sole artist of five of these etchings, since many have a duplicate created by her tutor Fragonard. More than 300 genre paintings, 80 portraits, and several miniatures have been documented to Gérard. One of her paintings, The Clemency of Napoleon, was purchased by Napoleon in 1808.

== Biography ==
Upon the death of her mother in 1775, Marguerite Gérard, the youngest of the seven children, took up residence in the Louvre with her sister and her sister's husband Jean-Honoré Fragonard. She lived in the Louvre with them for approximately thirty years, allowing her to view and be inspired by great artworks of the past and present. By 1785 she had established a reputation for being a gifted genre painter, the first French woman to do so. Of particular interest to Gérard were the genre scenes of the Dutch Golden Age which she would emulate in her own work. She was denied membership to the Académie Royale de Peinture et de Sculpture due to its rules limiting the number of female artists to four at any one time. The academy denied women the free art training offered to men at the Ecole des Beaux-Arts, or the right to compete for the prestigious Prix de Rome. Despite these obstacles, she went on to exhibit widely, particularly following the French Revolution when the Salon was opened to women. Her work was exhibited in the Salon between 1799 and 1824 and she won a Prix du 5ème classe at the Salon of 1799, a Prix d'encouragement at the Salon of 1801 and a Medaille d'Or at the Salon of 1804.

Her association with Fragonard's circle allowed Gérard the freedom to remain unmarried without becoming a financial burden to herself and her parents; this allowed her to devote her life to becoming an artist, a career she continued with considerable commercial success for more than fifty years. Speculation that Gérard and Fragonard were lovers has been thoroughly disproved, and Gérard referred to the older artist as a father figure. After the death of Fragonard she continued to live with her sister for 17 years.

== Art production ==
Gérard became interested in art while living with her sister, Marie-Anne Fragonard, and brother-in-law, Jean-Honoré Fragonard, in Paris. She aspired to become an artist like her sister, a painter of miniatures, and her brother-in-law encouraged her ambitions. She began training with Fragonard at the age of 16. She became an unofficial apprentice of Jean-Honoré Fragonard, working from his drawings to create her first pieces of work; soon after, she began to create her own genre paintings. The depiction of everyday life closely resembles the style of Gerard Ter Borch and Gabriël Metsu, Dutch artists from the seventeenth century. Much like these Dutch artists, Gérard painted meticulous details using finely blended brushstrokes. Her unpretentious paintings represented the major underground current in the art of the early 1800s. Depicting the minor domestic dramas in the homes of the rich middle class, Marguerite Gérard not only paved the way for other women artists, but also men of the next generation, including her nephew Alexandre Evariste, to whom she tried to be what Fragonard had been to her.

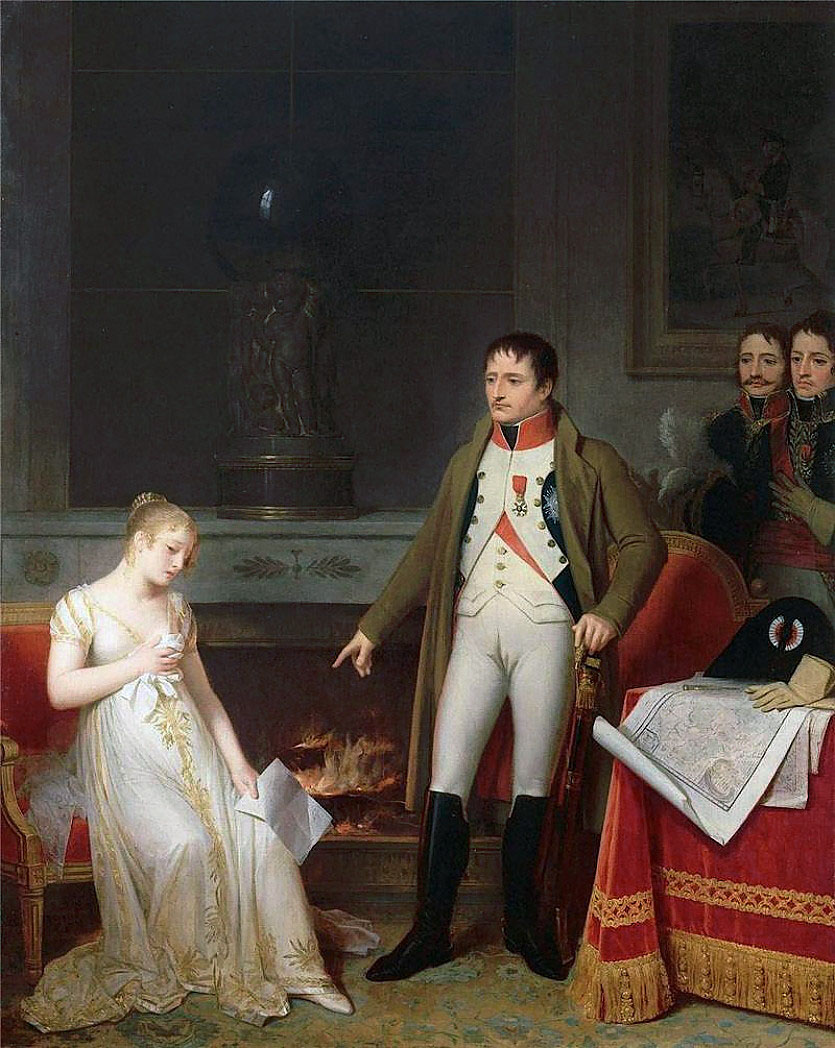
The Clemency of Napoleon (1806)

=== Subjects ===
As a genre artist, Gérard focused on portraying scenes of intimate domestic life. However, unlike other female painters who liked to refer to classical antiquity, Marguerite Gérard often used costumes and settings from a few centuries before her own. Domestic cats and dogs also show up repeatedly in Gérard's work. Many of her paintings illustrate the experience of motherhood and childhood within the home, and several emphasize the importance of music and female companionship. One of her more ambitious engravings, The Genius of Franklin (Le Génie de Franklin), depicts an allegorical scene of Benjamin Franklin and America personified as a woman. This engraving's subject matter helped introduce Gérard's work to a larger audience since prints could be produced easily. Gérard also painted at least thirty-five portraits of painters, actors, and patrons between 1787 and 1791.

=== Reception and recognition ===
Gérard was a well-known painter during her lifetime. LeBreton's official report of the state of French art published in 1808 states that by 1789, Gérard's reputation matched those of Anne Vallayer-Coster, Adélaïde Labille-Guiard and Elisabeth Vigée-Lebrun. By 1785, she had established a reputation as a gifted genre painter, and was one of the first French women to do so. Her art was advertised with the phrase "sous les yeux de Fragonard" (under the eyes of Fragonard) to give her early work credibility. This has caused many art historians to overestimate Fragonard's role in her art. By her mid-20s, Gérard had developed her signature style, which featured painstakingly accurate details rendered with subtly blended brush strokes. It is currently accepted that Gérard made the five etchings in 1778 by herself based on Fragonard's drawings. After the Revolution, once the Salons began accepting art created by women, Gérard exhibited from 1799 to 1824. Despite her lack of formal training, she won three medals for her artwork. One of her paintings, The Clemency of Napoleon, was purchased by Emperor Napoleon in 1808. Other patrons included Louis XVIII and various members of the upper class. Wealthy collectors purchased her original paintings to display in their homes, while engravings of her paintings were spread among the middle class.

== Principal exhibitions ==
Paris Salon:

Salon of 1799: four paintings (winner of prix du 5ème classe)

Salon of 1801: three paintings (winner of a prix d'encouragement for the painting 'deux jeunes époux lisant leur correspondence d'amour')

Salon of 1802: three paintings

Salon of 1804: at least seven works (winner of a médaille d'or)

Salon of 1806: three paintings

Salon of 1808: three paintings

Salon of 1810: four paintings

Salon of 1814: seven paintings

Salon of 1817: three paintings

Salon of 1822: four paintings

Salon of 1824: two paintings

== Recent exhibitions ==
Parfums d'Interdit, Musée Fragonard, 25 May 23 September 2018, Grasse

Royalists to Romantics: Women Artists from the Louvre, Versailles, and Other French National Collections, National Museum of Women in the Arts, 24 February to 29 July 2012, Washington D.C.

Petits théâtres de l'intime, Musée des Augustins, 22 October 2011 to 22 January 2012, Toulouse

Marguerite Gérard, Musée Cognacq-Jay, 10 November to 6 December 2009, Paris

Trois femmes peintres dans le siècle de Fragonard. 18 April to 18 October 1998 Musée de la Parfumerie Fragonard, Grasse

== Gallery ==
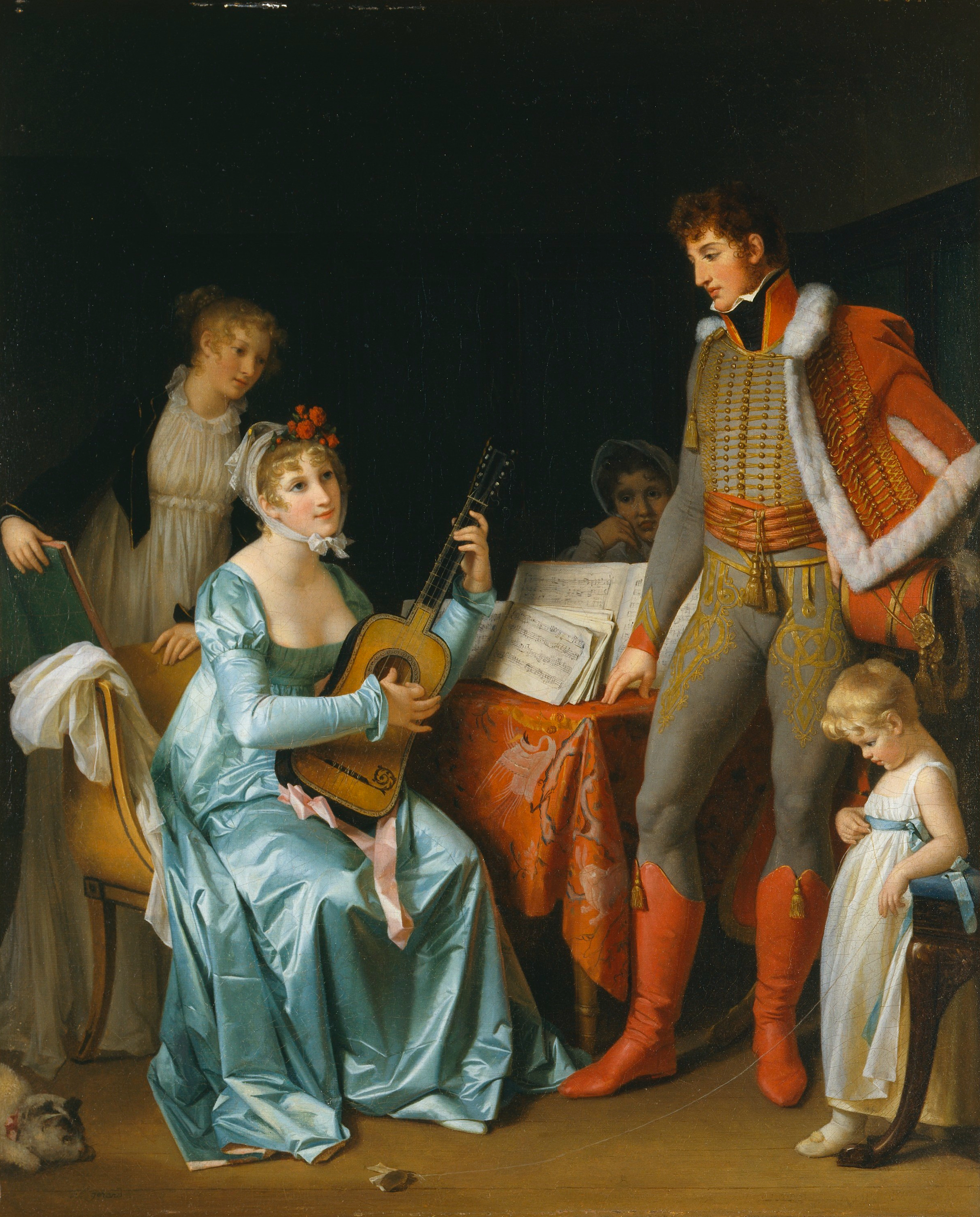
La duchesse d'Abrantès et le général Junot (Duchess of Abrantès and General Junot), oil on canvas, ca. 1800

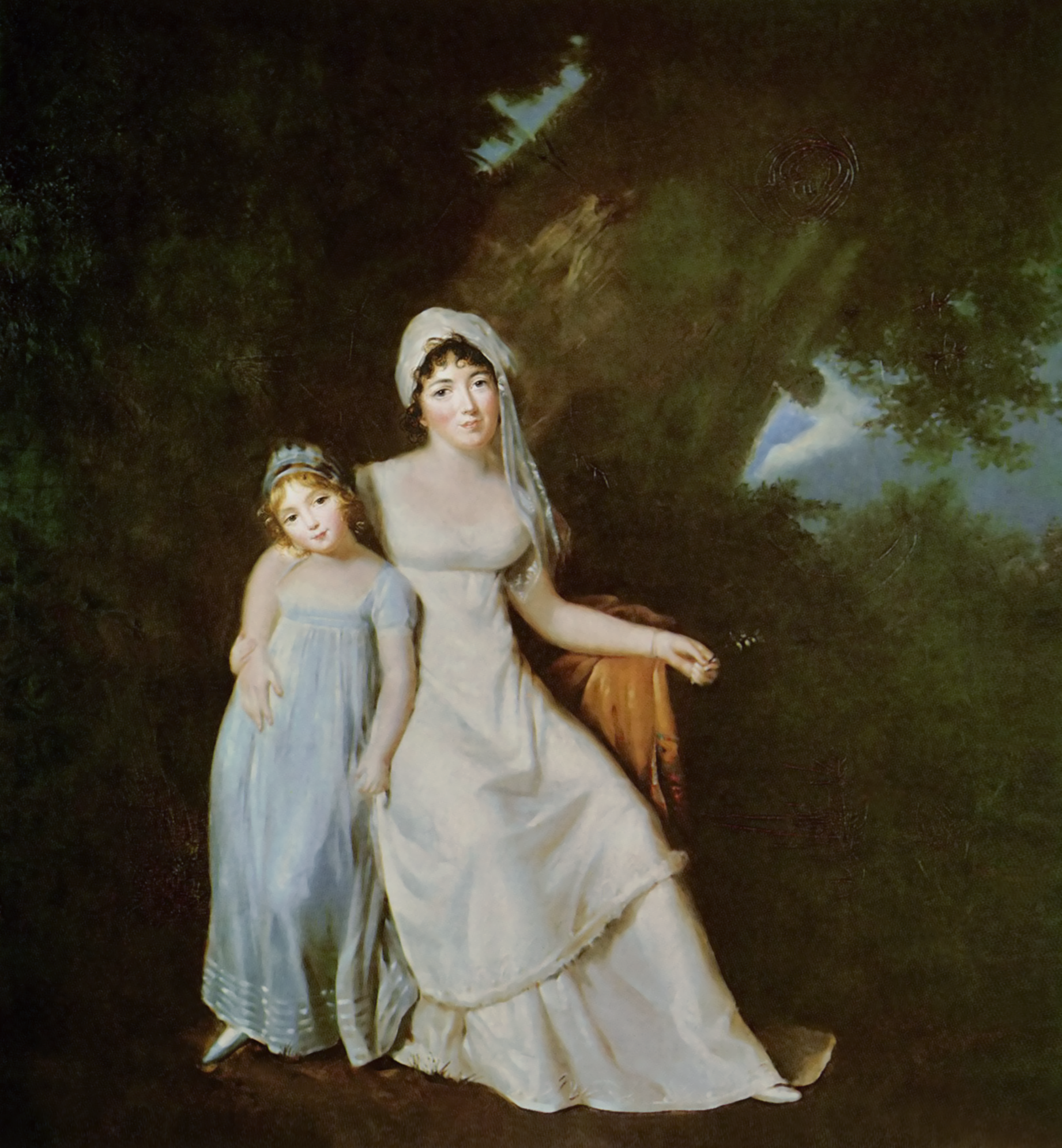
Mme de Staël et sa fille Albertine (Mme de Staël and her daughter Albertine), oil on canvas, 1803–1808

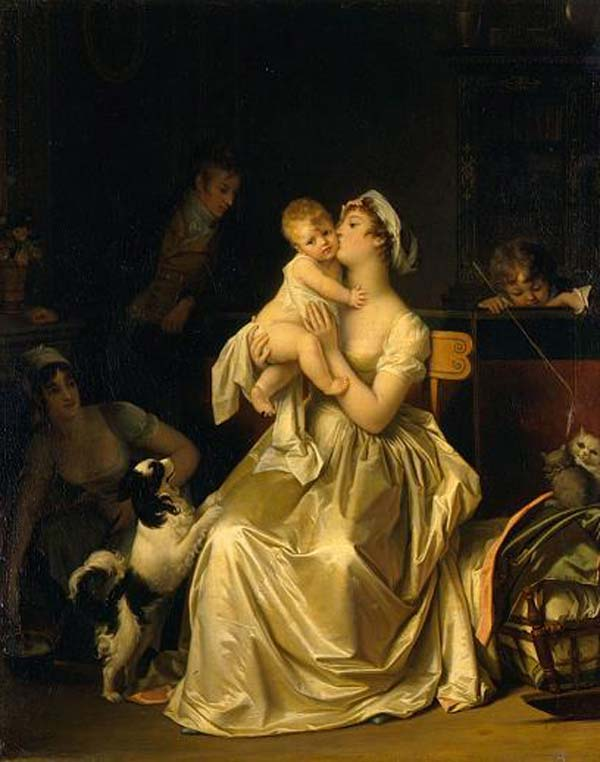
La Maternité (Motherhood), oil on canvas, 51 x 61 cm, 1795–1800

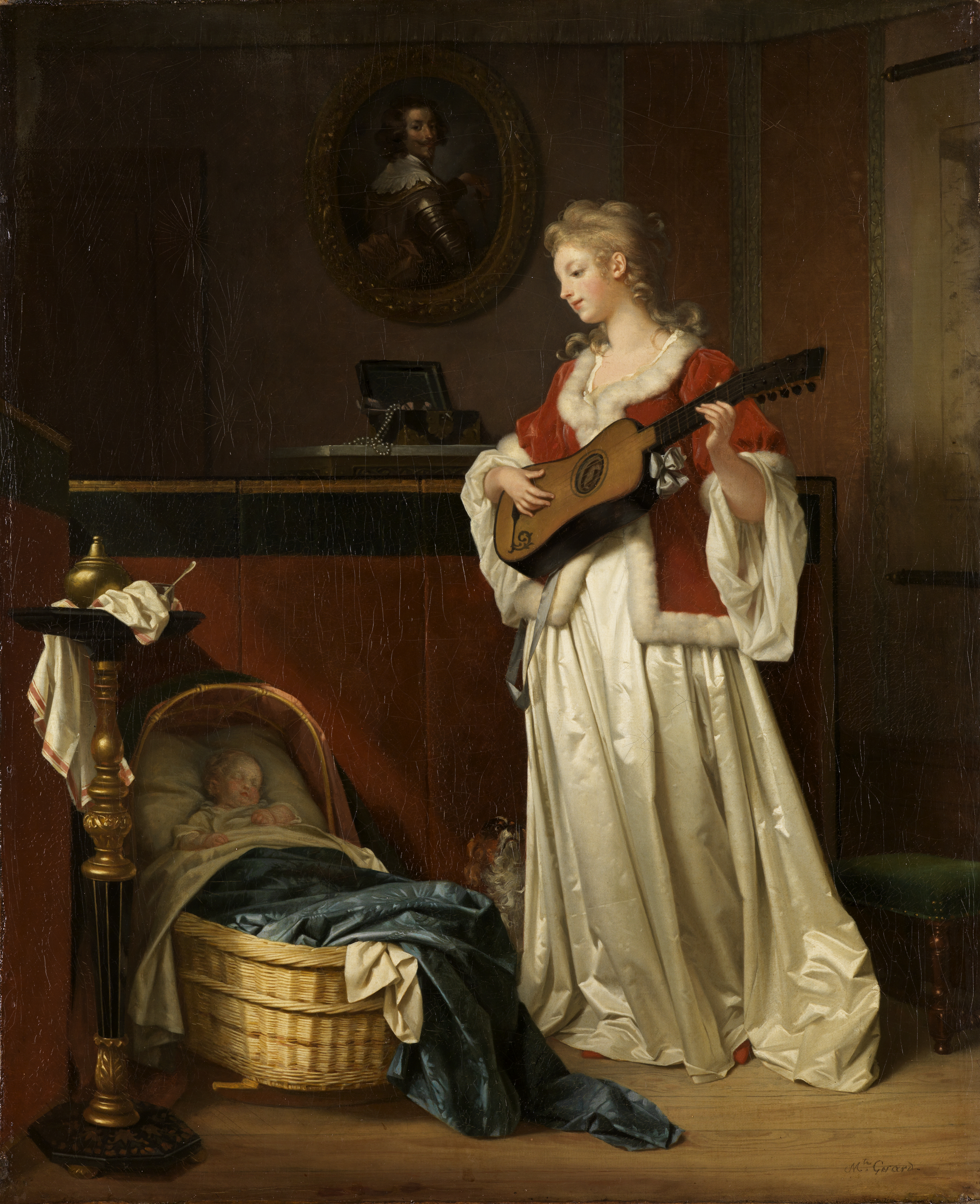
Dors, mon enfant (Sleep my child), oil on canvas, 55 x 45 cm, 1783–1786

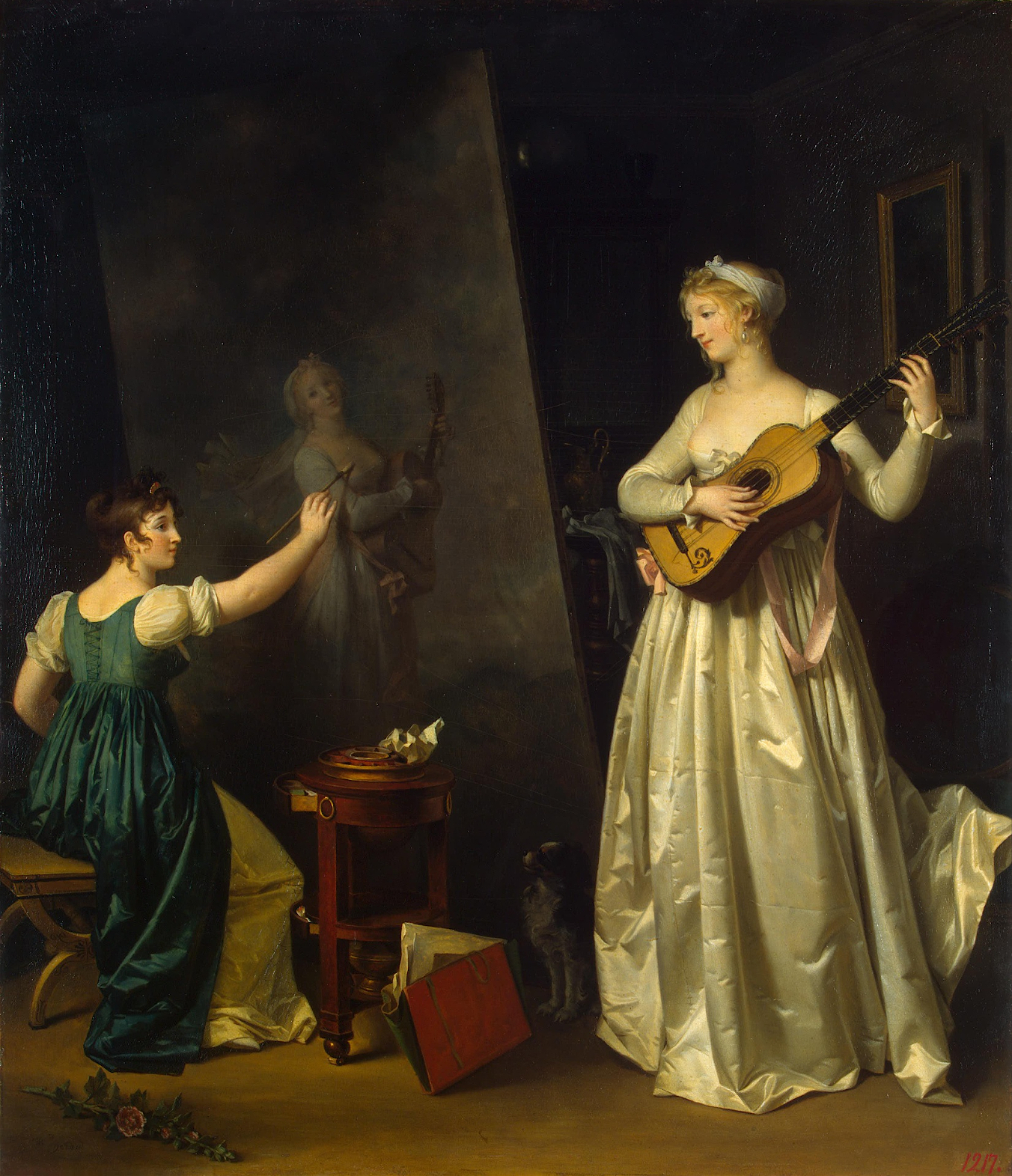
Peintre faisant le portrait d'une joueuse de luth (Painter when painting a portrait of a lute player), 61 x 51.5 cm, before 1803

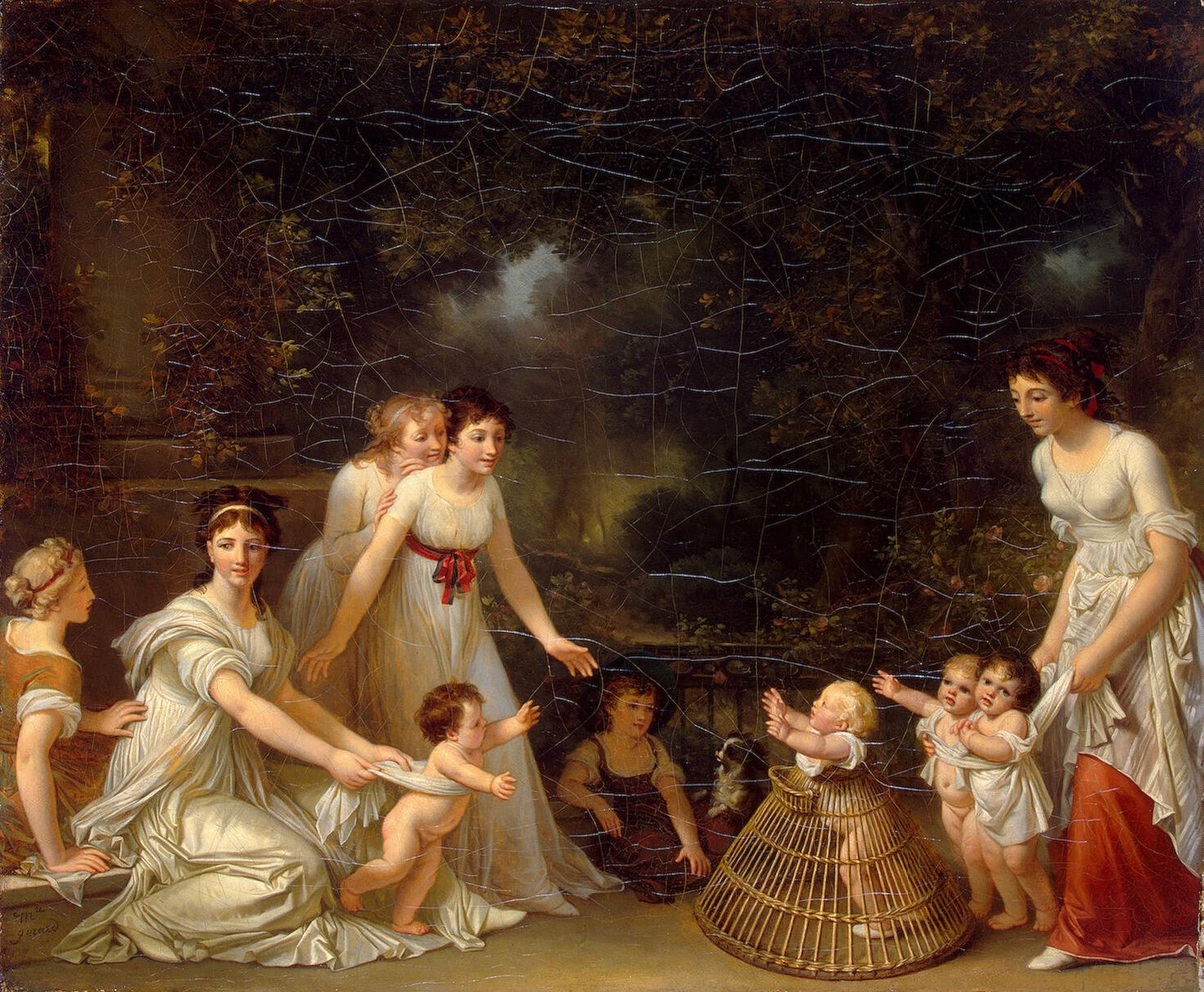
First steps, oil on canvas, 45.5 x 55 cm, ca. 1788

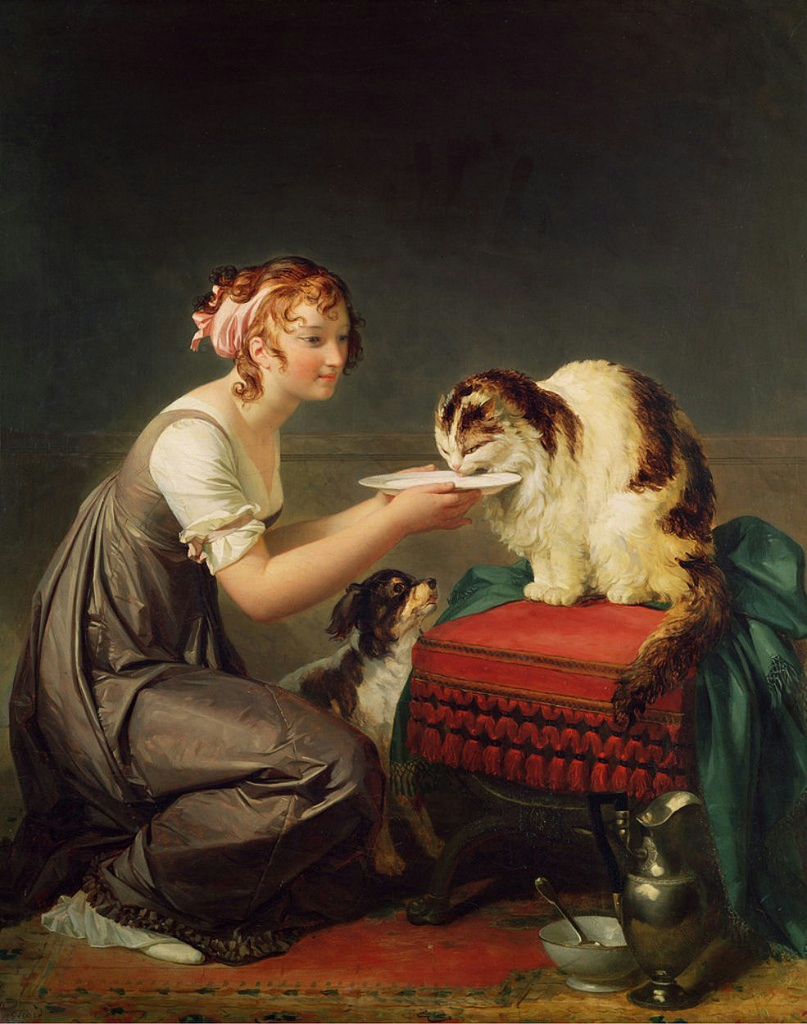
Le déjeuner du chat ("The Cat's Lunch"), oil on canvas, Musée Fragonard, Grasse, France

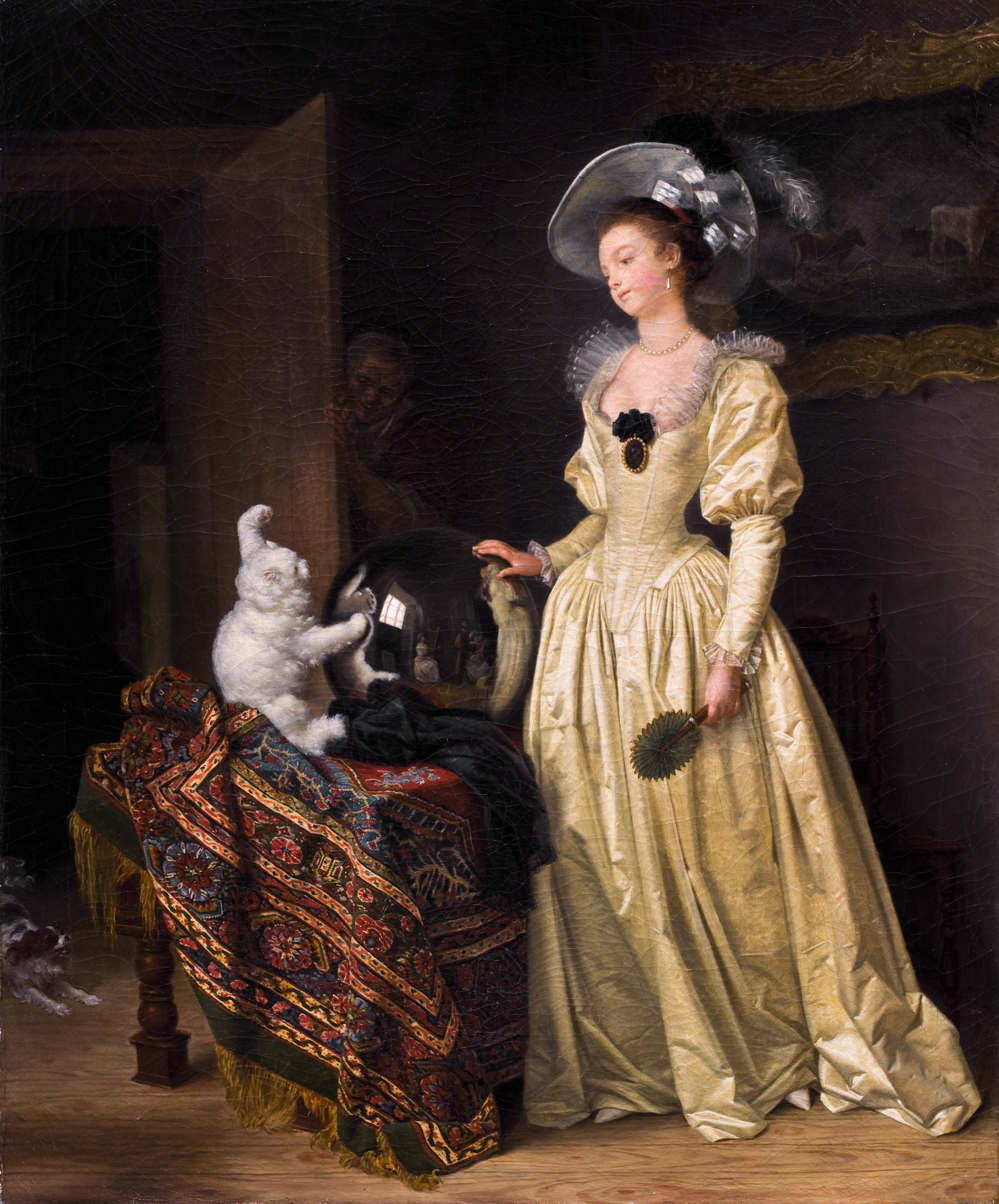
Le chat angora, oil on canvas, 1780, 65 x 53.5 cm

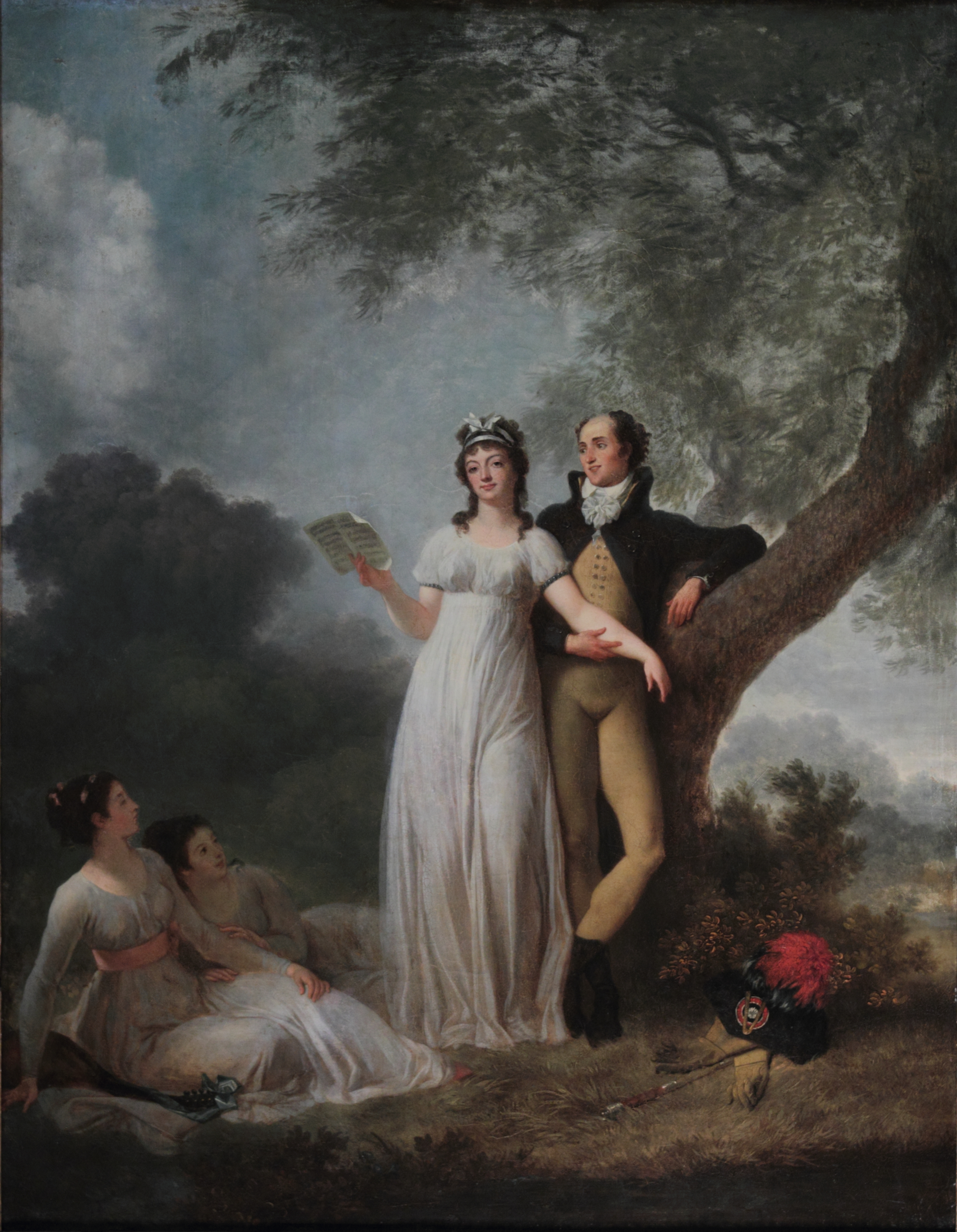
The Song, oil on canvas, 1785
