= Portrait of Philibert Rivière =

Painting by Jean-Auguste-Dominique Ingres

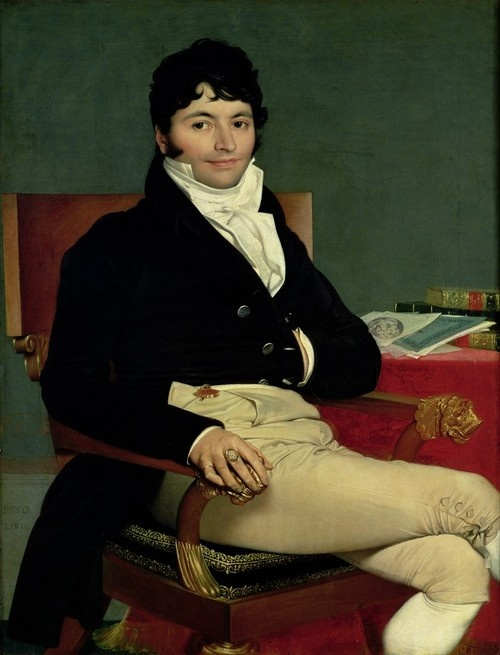
Portrait of Philibert Rivière, by Ingres, 1805, oval, 46 x 46 in. Louvre, Paris

Portrait of Philibert Rivière is a c. 1805 oil on canvas painting by the French Neoclassical artist Jean-Auguste-Dominique Ingres. It was commissioned by Philibert Rivière de L'Isle, an influential court official in the Napoleonic Empire, along with portraits of his wife, Philibert and their daughter, Caroline.

The couple also has a son, Paul, who was not portrayed. The three portraits comprised Ingres' first major commission, were completed when he was c 23 years old. They are each very different in tone and approach, but were highly successful from an artistic point of view, and all considered among his early masterpieces.

== Description ==
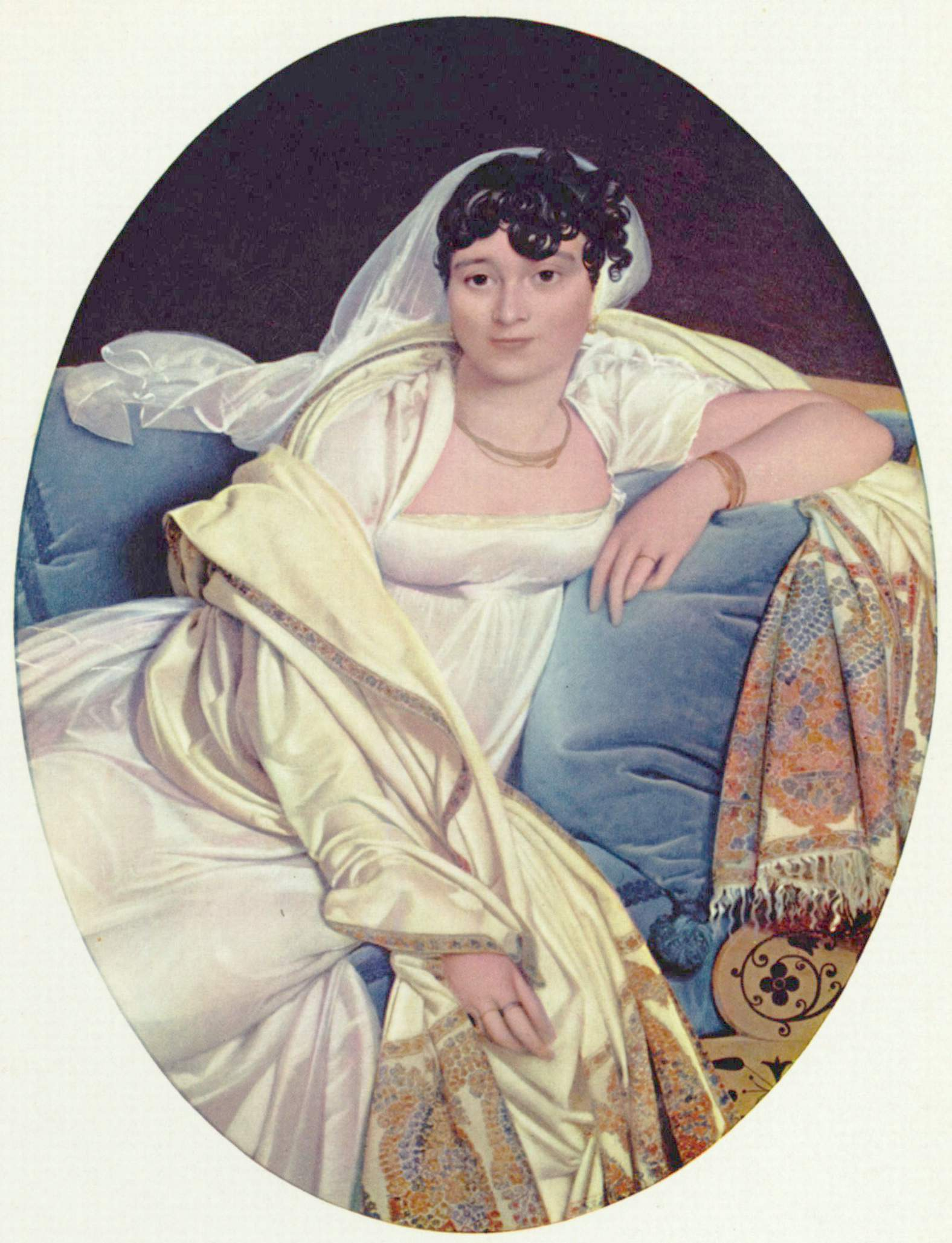
Ingres, Portrait of Madame Rivière, 1806

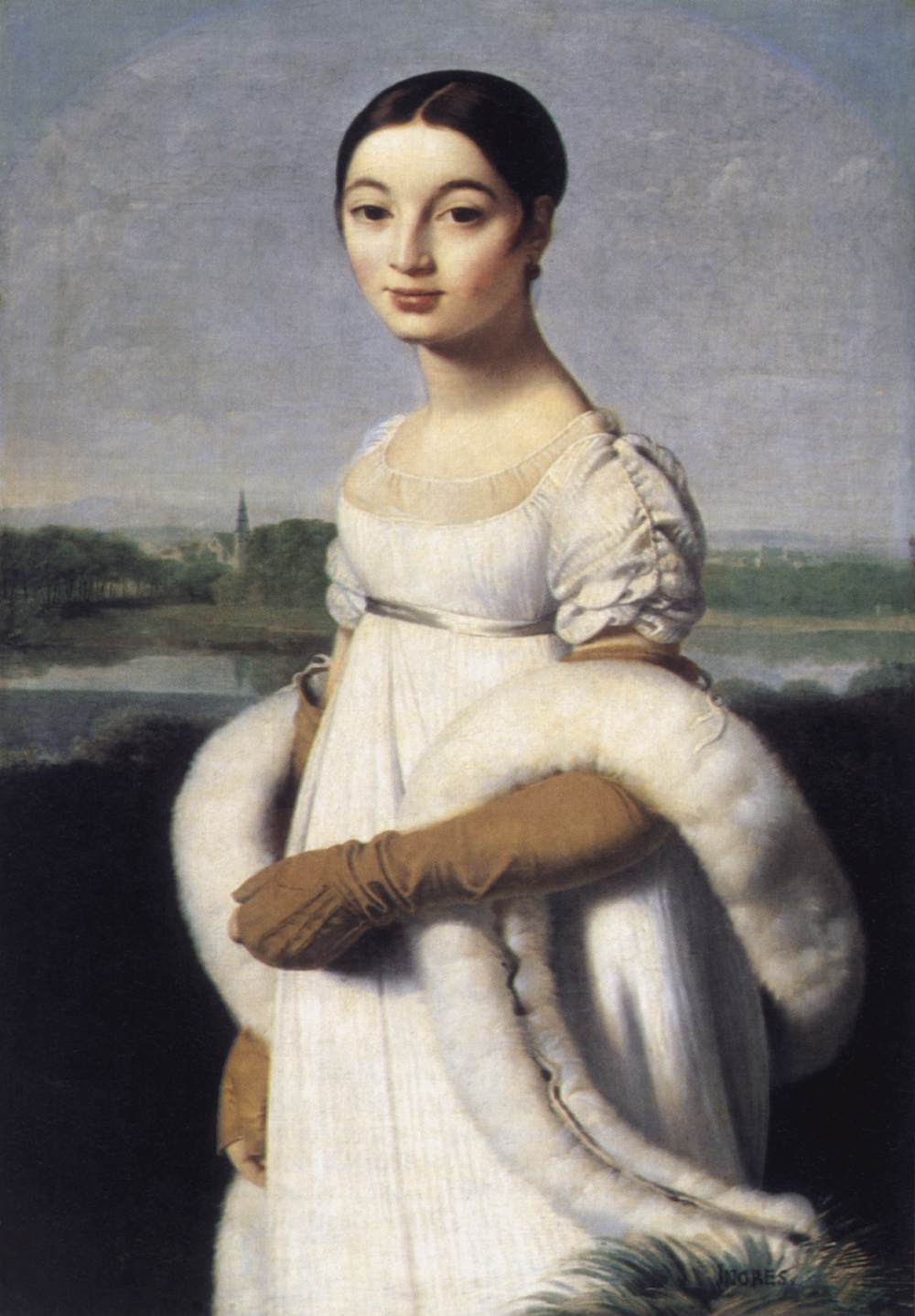
Ingres, Mademoiselle Caroline Rivière, 1806

As an official commission, the painting is very different from Ingres' earlier male portraits, which were mostly informal descriptions of friends. Philibert is shown in an official pose, sitting on a highly ornate and expensive chair, and posed beside a table draped with a red velvet cloth, and containing documents related to his office. His hand is tucked inside his vest, in a pose reminiscent of Napoleon.

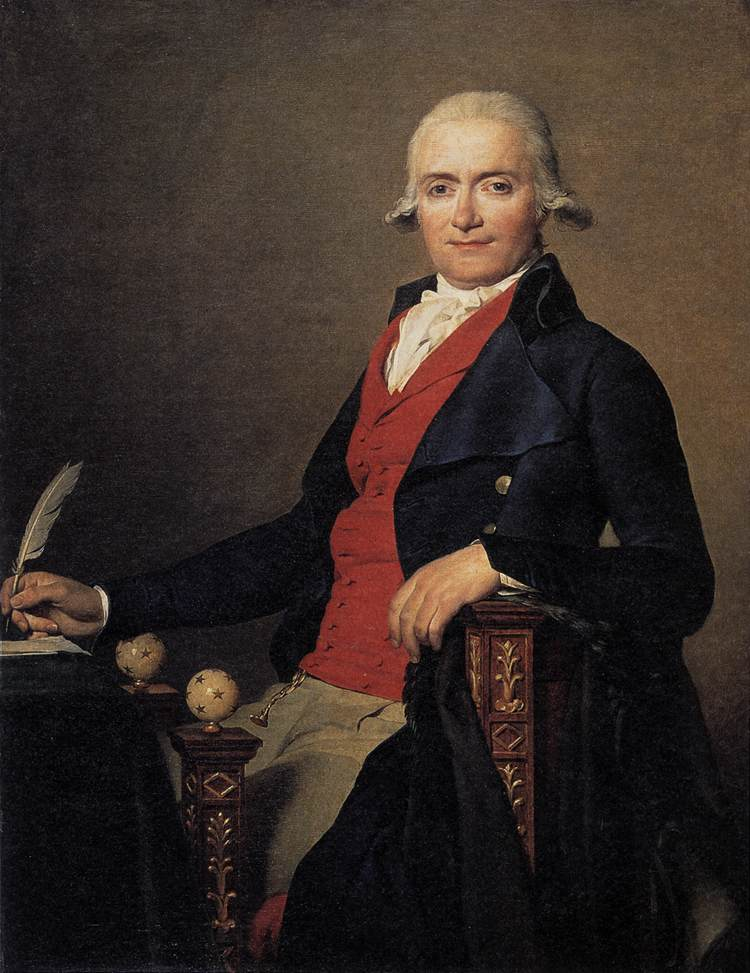
Jacques-Louis David, Portrait of Gaspar Mayer, 1795

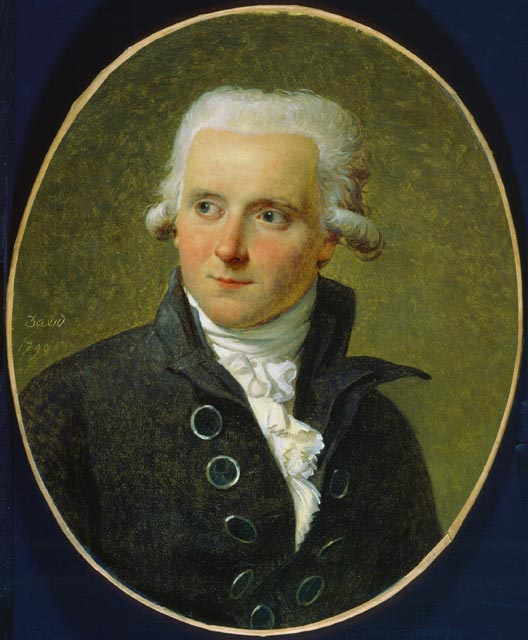
David, Portrait of Pierre Sériziat, c 1790

The painting was influences by the work of Jacques-Louis David, in particular his amiable portraits of Pierre Sériziat and Gaspar Mayer. Here Rivière may appear imposing, while also relaxed and friendly. The painting is very flat and spatially restrictive.

Unusually for Ingres, there are no surviving preparatory sketches. The artist signed and dated the canvas at the lower left.

== See also ==
- List of paintings by Jean-Auguste-Dominique Ingres

== Sources ==
- Rosenblum, Robert. Ingres. London: Harry N. Abrams, 1990. ISBN 978-0-300-08653-9
- Conisbee, Philip. Portraits by Ingres: Image of an Epoch. New York: Metropolitan Museum of Art, 1999. ISBN 978-0-300-08653-9
