= Mirabeau Replying to Dreux-Brézé =

C.1830 painting by Alexandre-Évariste Fragonard

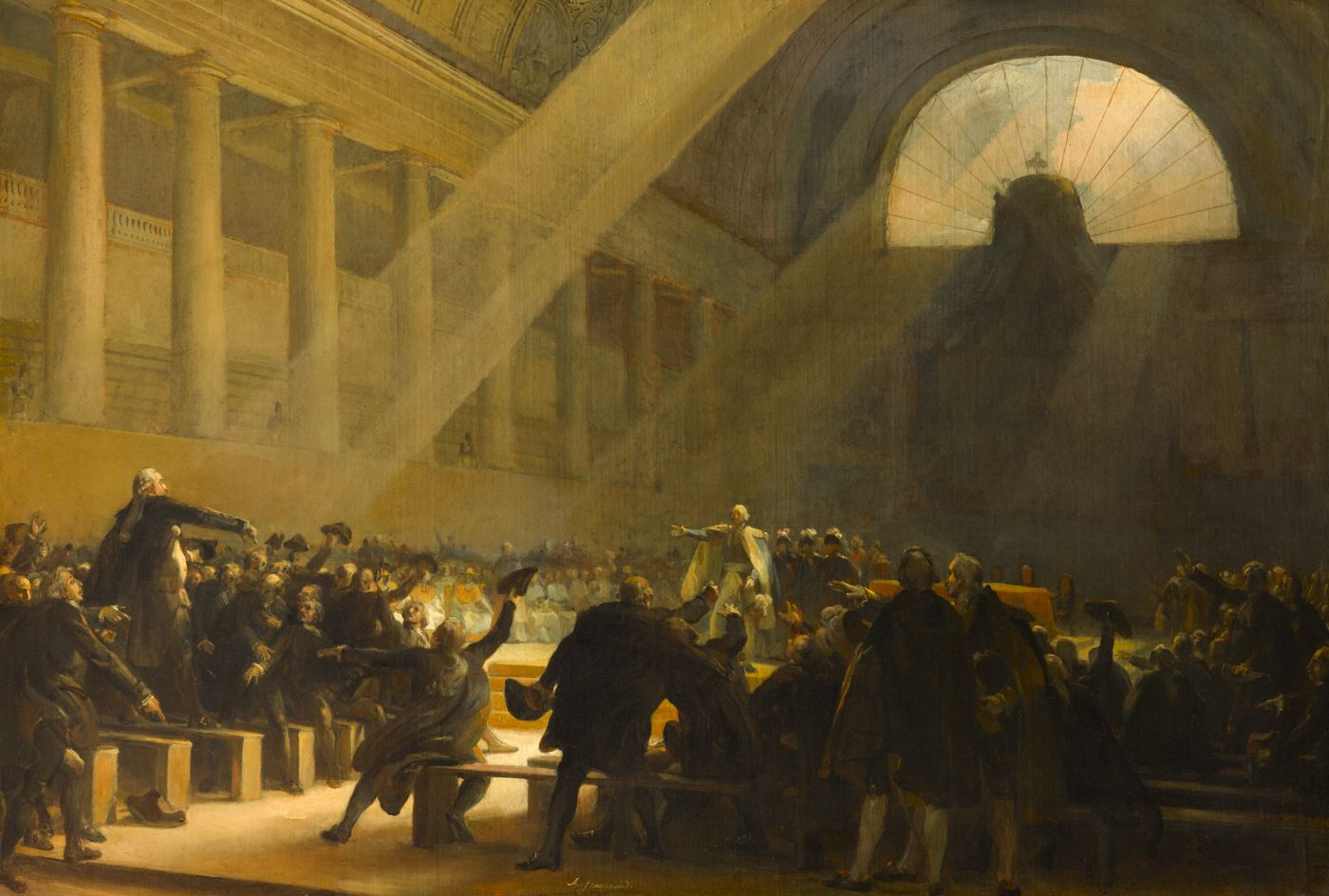
Mirabeau Replying to Dreux-Brézé (c. 1830) by Alexandre-Évariste Fragonard

Mirabeau Replying to Dreux-Brézé or Mirabeau Before Dreux-Brézé is a c.1830 oil on canvas by Alexandre-Évariste Fragonard showing Mirabeau's response to Henri-Évrard de Dreux-Brézé (sent by Louis XVI to split up the Estates General of 1789) in the immediate aftermath of the Tennis Court Oath. It is now in the Louvre Museum, which bought it in 1984.

== History ==
Fragonard submitted the work as an oil sketch entry to the July Monarchy's 1830 competition to decorate the meeting hall of the Chambre des députés. Other entrants included Paul Chenavard (now in the musée Carnavalet), Charles de Steuben (now in a private collection), Joseph-Désiré Court (now in the Musée des Beaux-Arts de Rouen) and Eugène Delacroix (now in the Ny Carlsberg Glyptotek). Fragonard's entry was ajudged to be too theatrical and dramatic and he did not win the competition.
