= Mademoiselle Caroline Rivière =

Painting by Jean-Auguste-Dominique Ingres

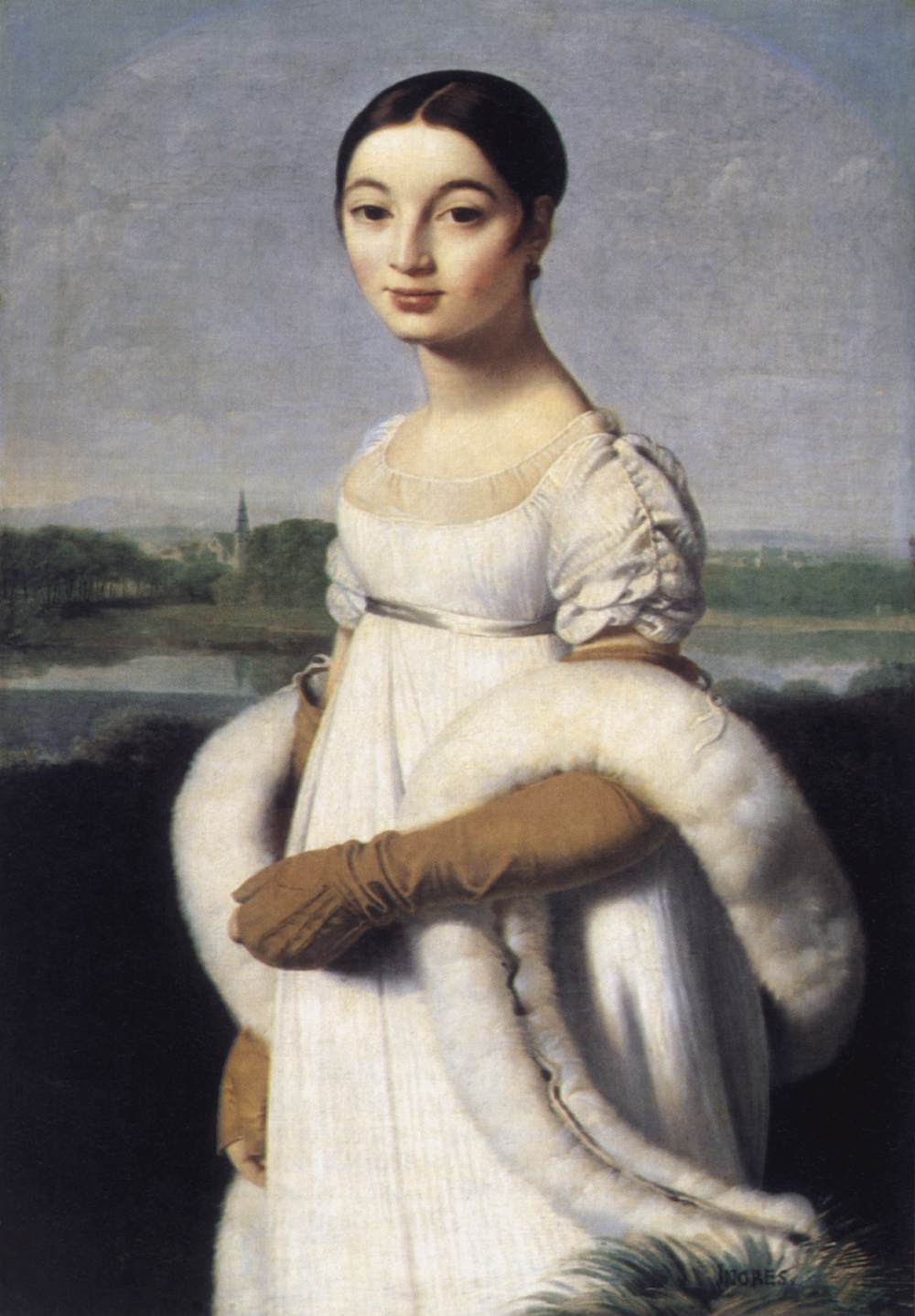
- Artist: Jean-Auguste-Dominique Ingres
- Year: 1805
- Medium: Oil on canvas
- Dimensions: 1 m × 1.22 m (39 in × 48 in)
- Location: Louvre, Paris
- Accession: MI 1447
- Website: collections.louvre.fr/en/ark:/53355/cl010059995

The portrait of Mademoiselle Caroline Rivière was painted in 1806 by the French Neoclassical artist Jean-Auguste-Dominique Ingres, and today hangs in the Louvre.

It is the third of three portraits of the Rivière family that the artist painted that year. Caroline's father, Philibert Rivière, was a successful court official under Napoleon's empire and sought to commemorate himself, his wife and daughter through a commission with the then young and rising artist—Ingres's portraits of Philibert and his wife are also still extant. Although Ingres favoured subject matter drawn from history or Greek legend, at this early stage in his career, he earned his living mainly through commissions from wealthy patrons.

The family lived outside Paris at St. Germain-en-Laye, and Mademoiselle Caroline Rivière would have been between 13 and 15 at the time she was portrayed; Ingres described her as the "ravishing daughter".

== Description ==
Rivière's portrait describes slightly built and youthful femininity and hints at a hesitant openness. The painting is rendered in bright hues and set against a serene white-blue early spring landscape, the freshness of which was intended to reflect the youth of the sitter. The background is not deeply portrayed; the perspective is shallow and rises, according to the art historian Robert Rosenblum, in "flattened horizontal tiers against which the figure seems crisply silhouetted as if in low relief."

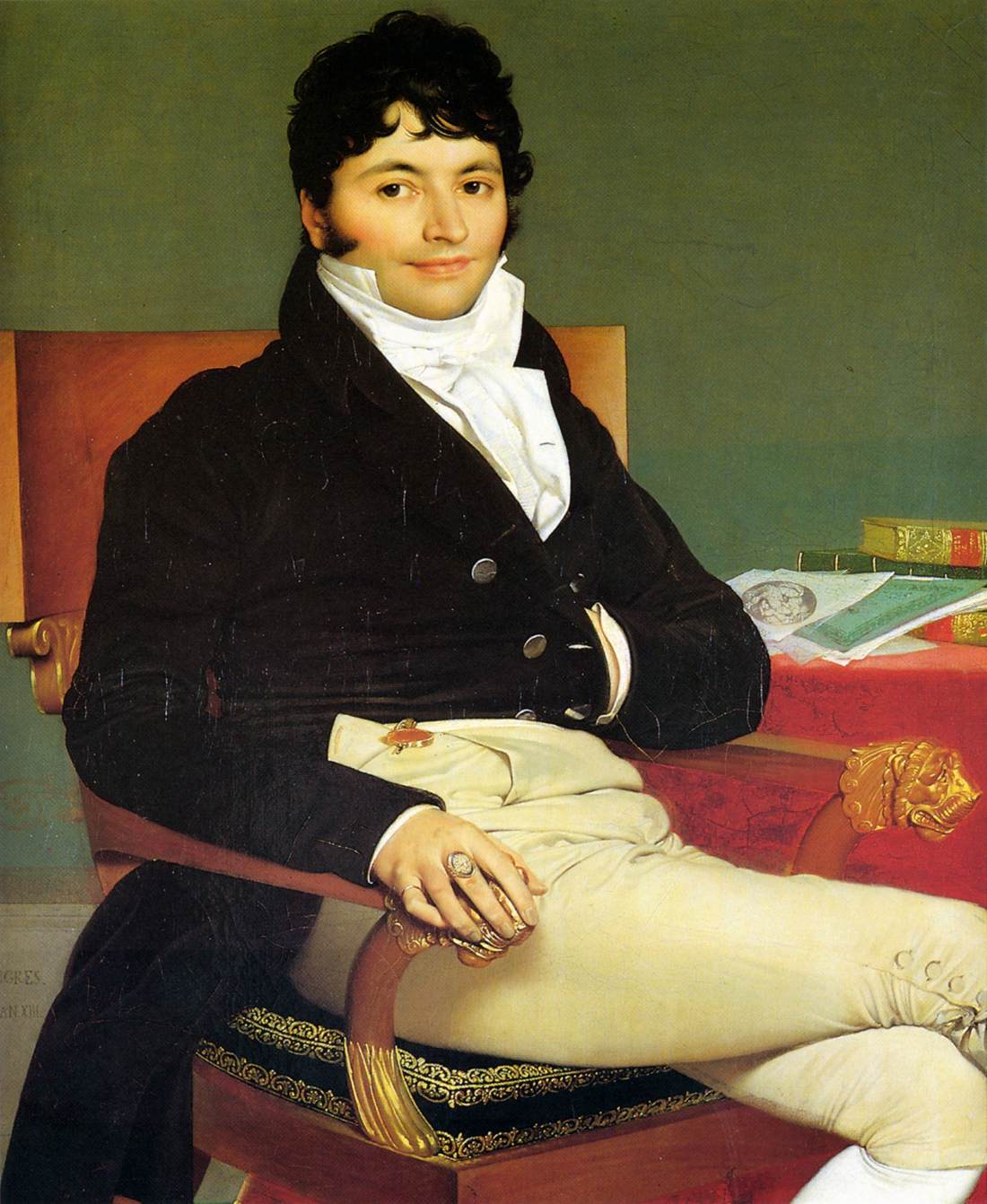
Portrait of Philibert Rivière, 1805

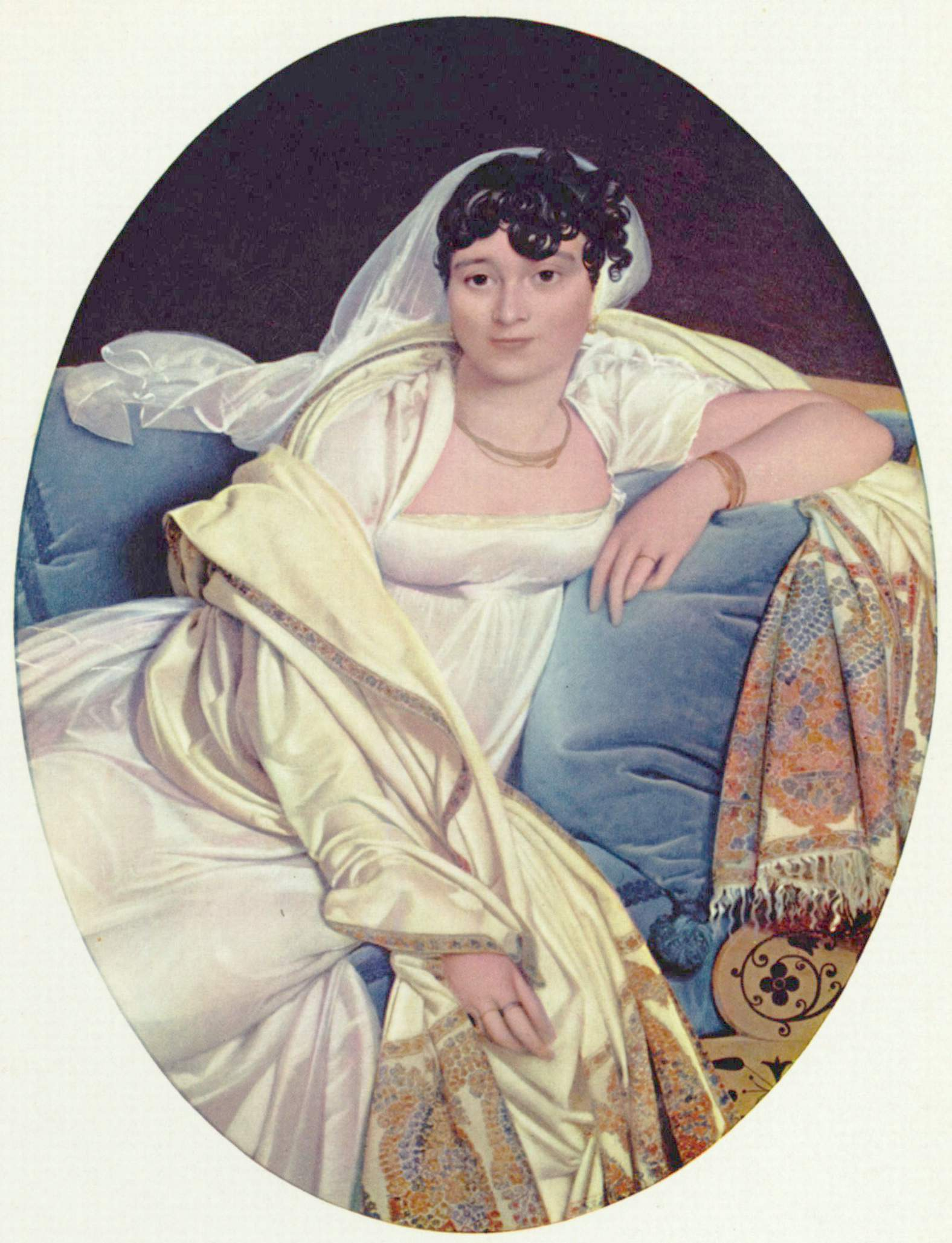
Portrait of Madame Rivière, 1805

Typical of contemporary portraits by Ingres, Caroline lacks anatomical accuracy. Her neck is overly elongated, and the bridge of her nose extends too far. Rivière is portrayed with the stiffness and awkwardness typical of her age, in a manner which was intended to emphasise a sense of the nascent purity and simplicity of her youth. Yet the painting is generally seen in the light of pathos and tragedy, as the sitter died within a year of the work being completed.

It was, along with Ingres's two other portrayals of the family, exhibited at the Salon of 1806, but was poorly received for its perceived "Gothicness" (due to its precision of line and enamel finish) and its similarity to Jan van Eyck and other artists of Early Netherlandish painting (in French "Les Primitifs Flamands") who at the time were only just being rediscovered. Further, the manner in which the whiteness of the sitter's dress contrasts with the curve of her boa offended some viewers. Today, the painting is typically seen as a peak in Ingres's artistic career, and in this work Ingres introduces an emotional link between figurative and landscape art, and the watery scape behind the sitter evokes rhythms with many of the visual themes presented in the rich imagery of the foreground.

In 2003, the art critic Jonathan Jones remarked of the painting:

The sexuality Ingres usually reserved for harem fantasies slips over into the real and respectable world in this charged portrait. His obviously intense visual relationship with his subject and his contentment to look, with a clinical waxy fetishism, at Mademoiselle Rivière's full lips, bared neck, long gloves and spectacularly serpentine boa, lend this picture drama."

Mademoiselle Caroline Rivière was bequeathed to the Louvre in 1870 by Caroline Rivière's sister-in-law.

== See also ==
- List of paintings by Jean-Auguste-Dominique Ingres

== Bibliography ==
- Mackrell, Alice. Art and Fashion. London: Batsford, 2005. ISBN 0-7134-8873-5
- Rosenblum, Robert. Ingres. London: Harry N. Abrams, 1990. ISBN 0-300-08653-9
- Toussaint, Hélène. Les Portraits d'Ingres. Paris: Ministère de la Culture, Editions de la Reunion des musées nationaux, 1985. 28–31.
- Whiteley, Jon. "Ingres. London, Washington and New York". The Burlington Magazine, Volume 141, Number 1154, May, 1999.
