= Château du Bousquet, Arcambal =

Castle in Lot, Occitania, France

Coordinates: 44.4562°N 1.5093°E

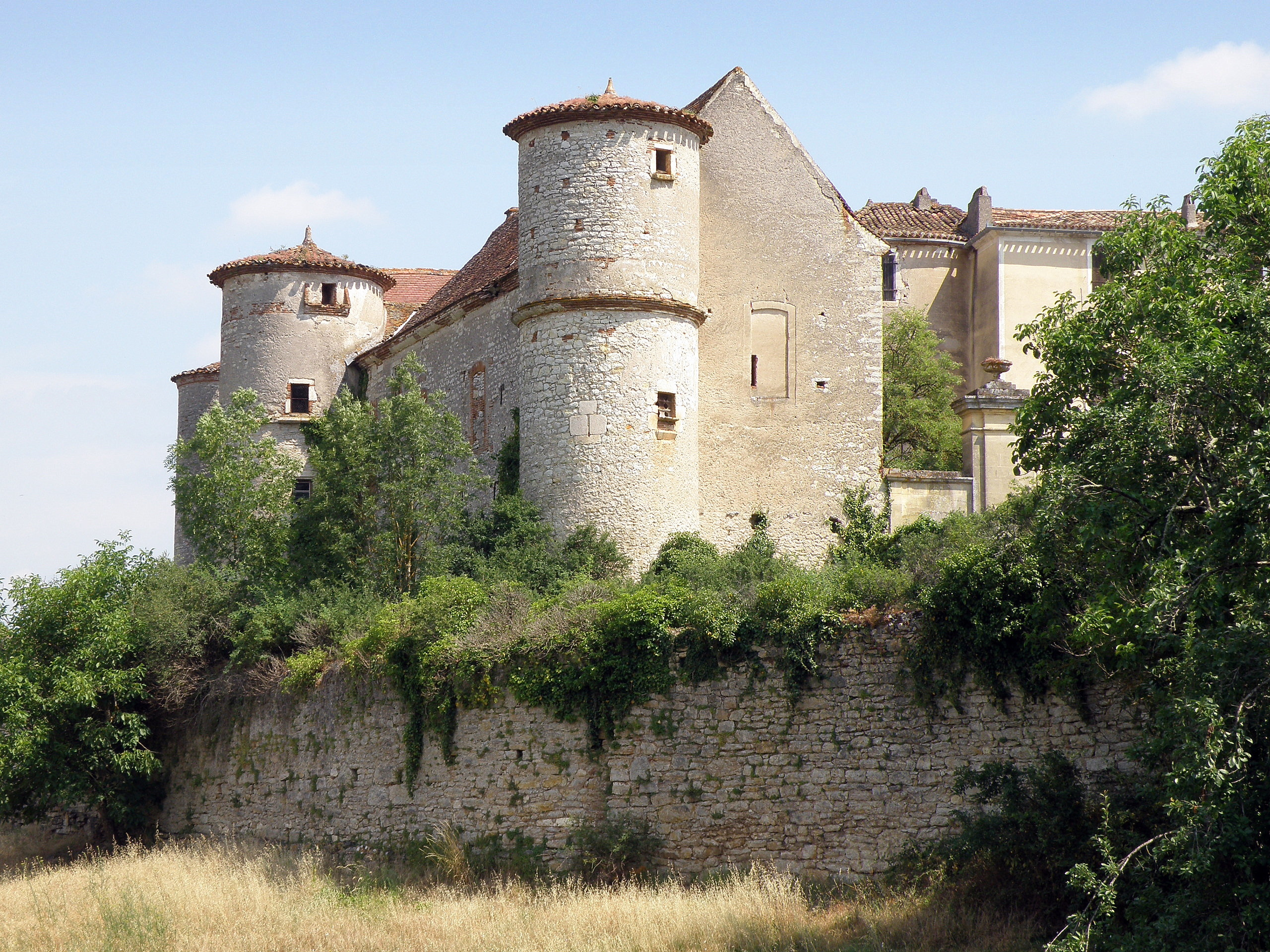

The Château du Bousquet is a castle in the commune of Arcambal in the Lot département of France.

== History ==
The castle's origins date from the 11th century and the keep, which does not appear to have been altered, is from this time. Alterations were made in the 13th, 15th, 16th and 17th centuries. The castle was burned on three occasions. According to legend, it was a former commandery of the Knights of Malta. This is false, although one of its seigneurs was a Knight of Malta.

== Description ==
The castle stands on a promontory dominating the Lot River. Its western side maintains a medieval fortified silhouette, with irregular circular towers. The interior still has a Gothic stone staircase and a hall vaulted with crossed ogives, one of which has an unusual shape to allow for the opening of window.

The castle is privately owned and is not open to the public. It has been listed since 1979 as a monument historique by the French Ministry of Culture.

== Gallery ==
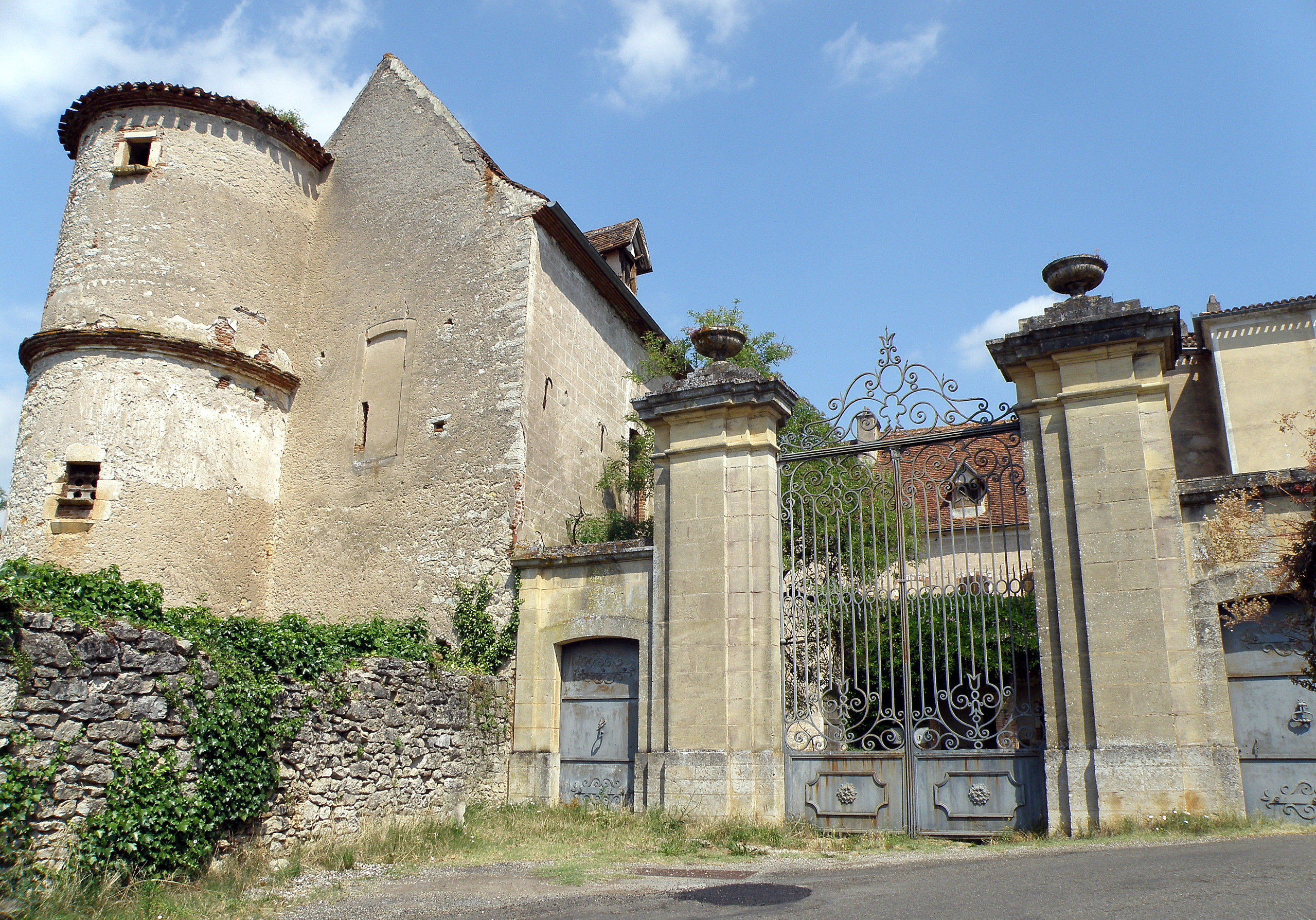

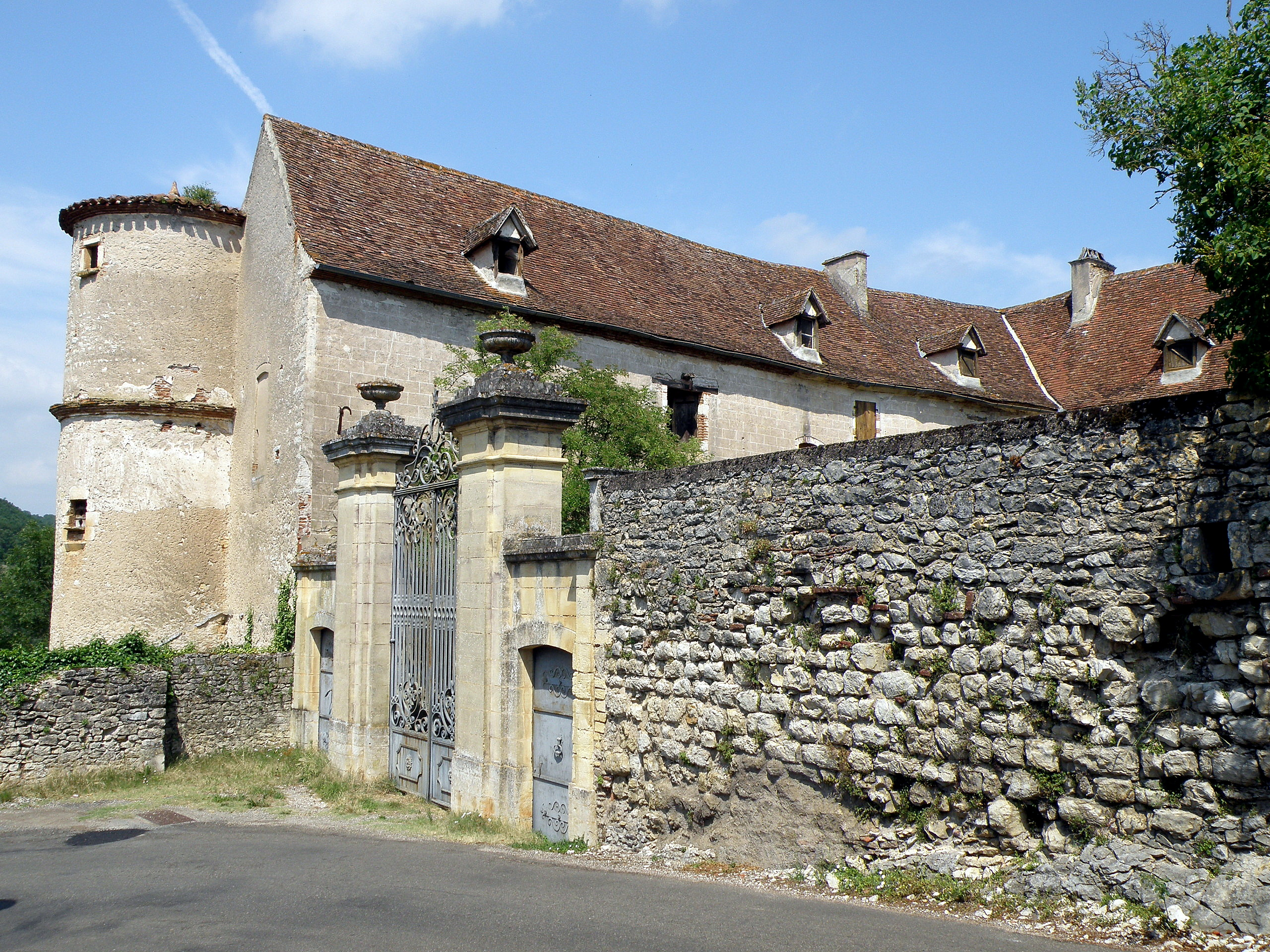

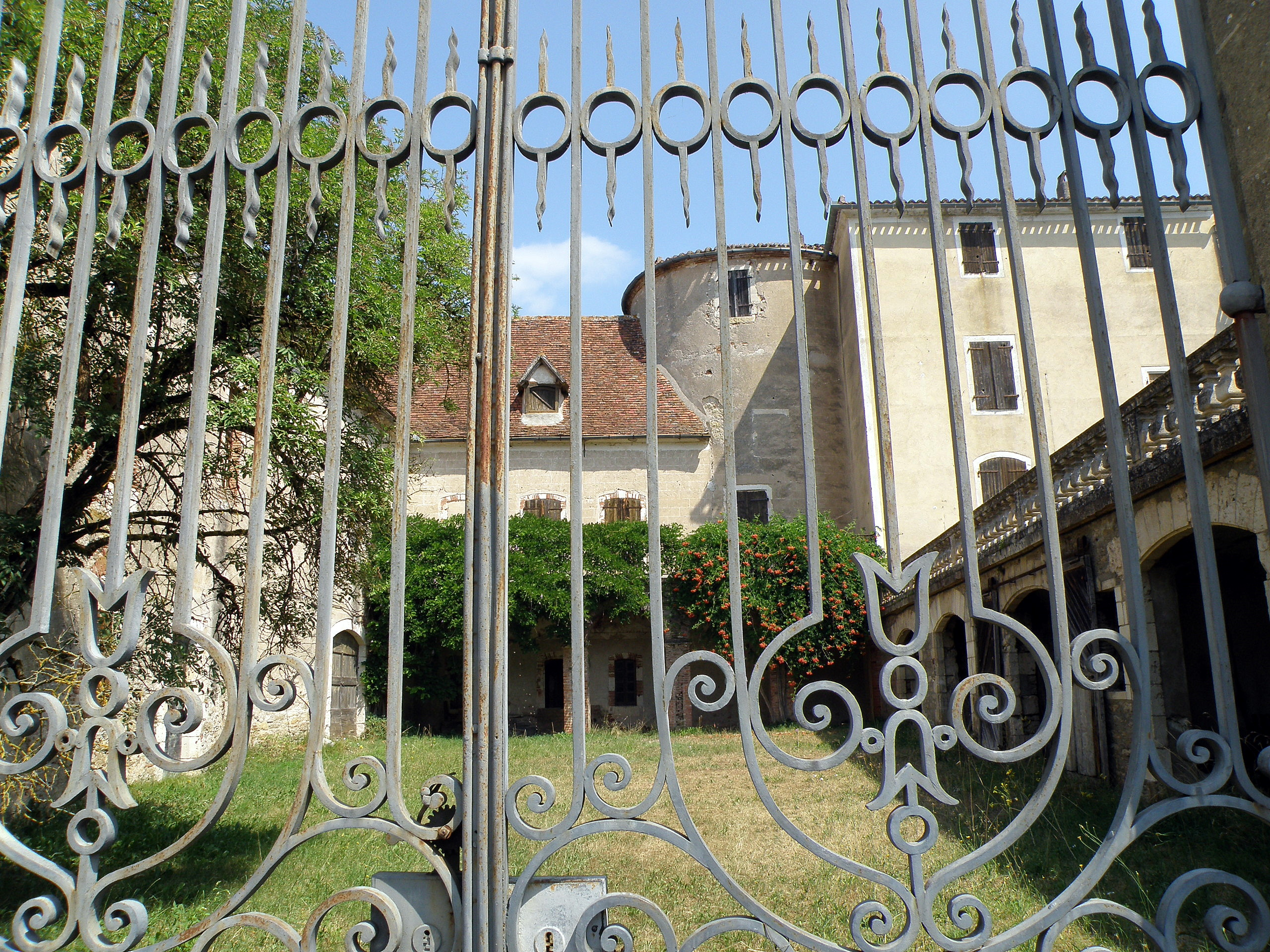

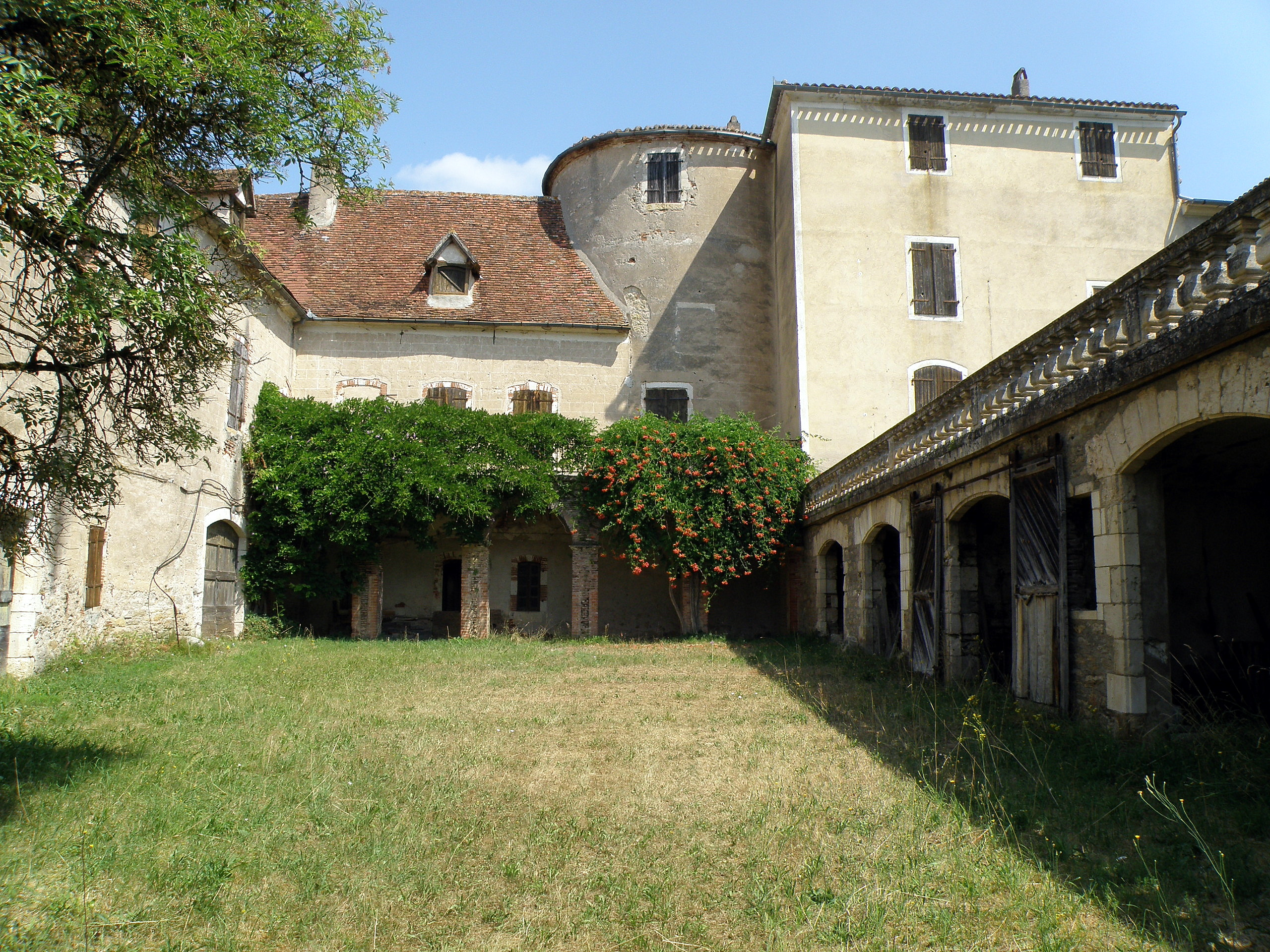

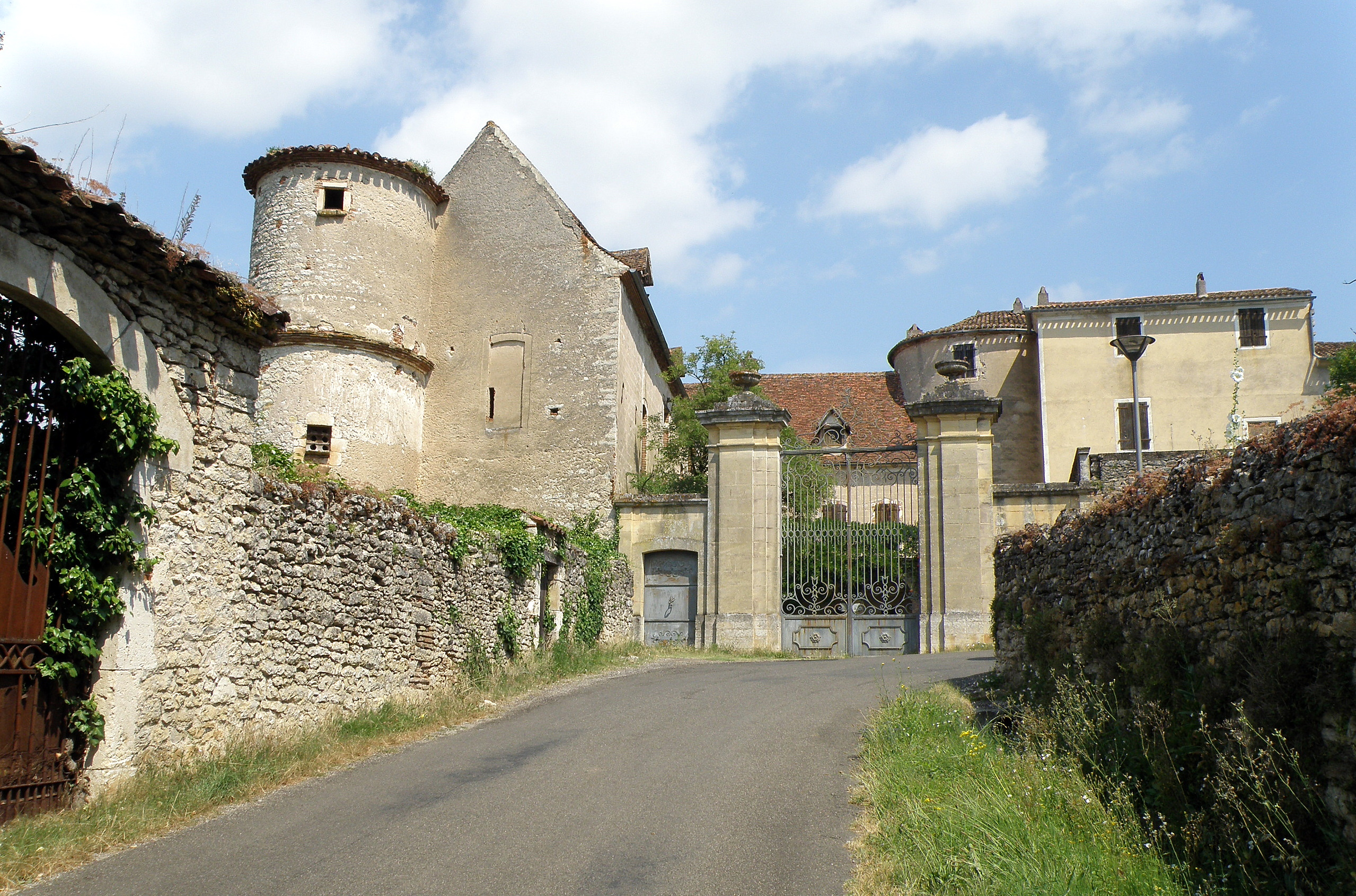

== See also ==
- List of castles in France
