= The Clemency of Napoleon =

Painting by Marguerite Gérard

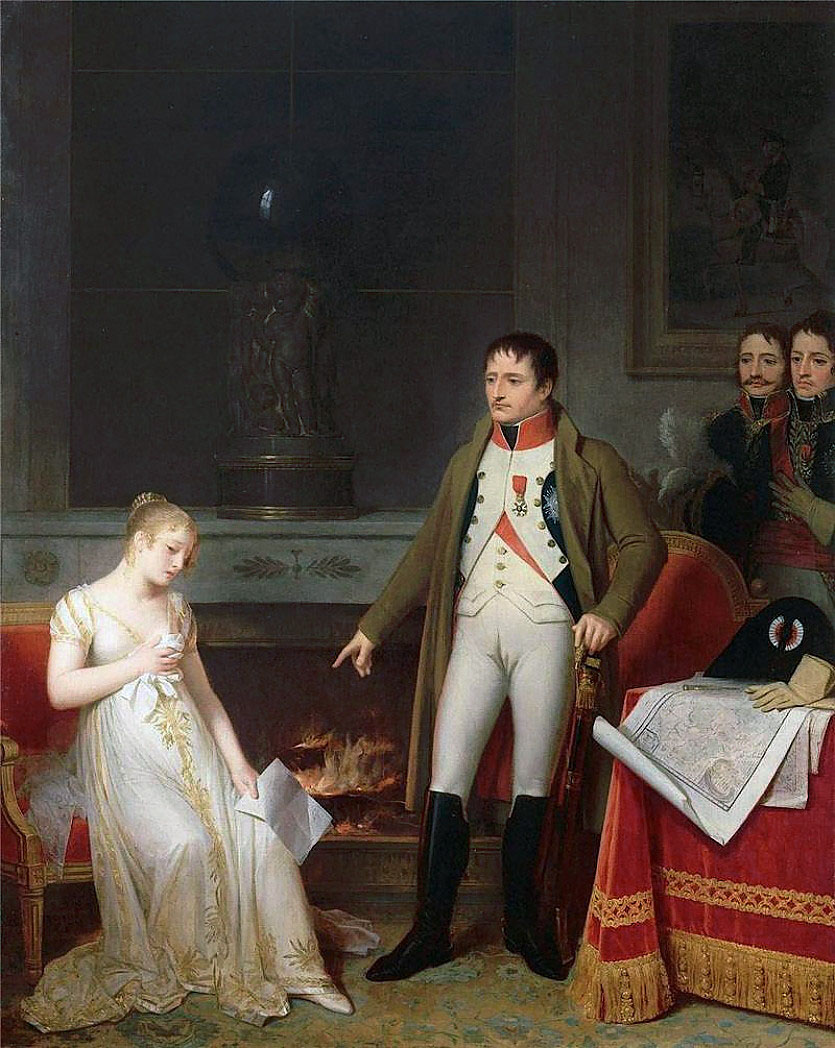
- Artist: Marguerite Gérard
- Year: 1806
- Type: History painting
- Medium: Oil on canvas
- Dimensions: 81 cm × 65 cm (32 in × 26 in)
- Location: Château de Malmaison; Paris

The Clemency of Napoleon (French: La Clémence de Napoléon) is an oil on canvas history painting by the French artist Marguerite Gérard, from 1806. It is held at the Château de Malmaison, in Paris.

== History and description ==
It depicts a scene from the Napoleonic Wars. At the time of the Fall of Berlin in the aftermath of the crushing Prussian defeat at Battle of Jena, the Prussian Prince Franz Ludwig von Hatzfeldt was arrested in the city as a spy accused of recording French troop numbers. The painting shows the moment when his heavily pregnant wife Princess Hatzfeldt successfully implored the Emperor of the French to spare her husband's life.

The sister-in-law and protégé of Jean-Honoré Fragonard, Gérard was one of the most prominent female artists of the Napoleonic era enjoying success with her portraits and genre paintings. This work was Gérard's only major history painting and was purchased by the Emperor. It was exhibited at the Salon of 1808 at the Louvre in Paris. It was acquired by the French state in 1992 and allocated to Château de Malmaison, once the residence of Empress Joséphine.

== Bibliography ==
- Bernier Georges. Consulat - Empire - Restauration: Art in Early XIX Century France. Wildenstein & Company, 1982.
- Dwyer, Philip. Citizen Emperor: Napoleon in Power. Yale University Press, 2013.
