= Marie-Anne Fragonard =

French artist (1745–1823)

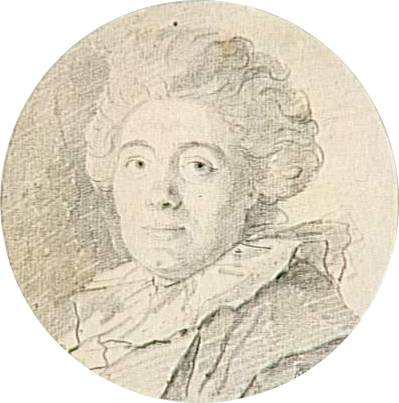
Marie-Anne Fragonard, née Gérard, 41-42 years by Jean-Honoré Fragonard, The Louvre, 1786-87

Marie-Anne Fragonard (French pronunciation: [maʁi an fʁaɡɔnaʁ]; née Gérard; 1745–1823) was a French painter of portrait miniatures.

Known for being the wife of the painter Jean-Honoré Fragonard since 1769, she also painted miniatures, which, after having long been attributed to her husband, were returned to her name by the historian Pierre Rosenberg. She painted in a free and easy style, which was close to the style of Jean-Honoré.

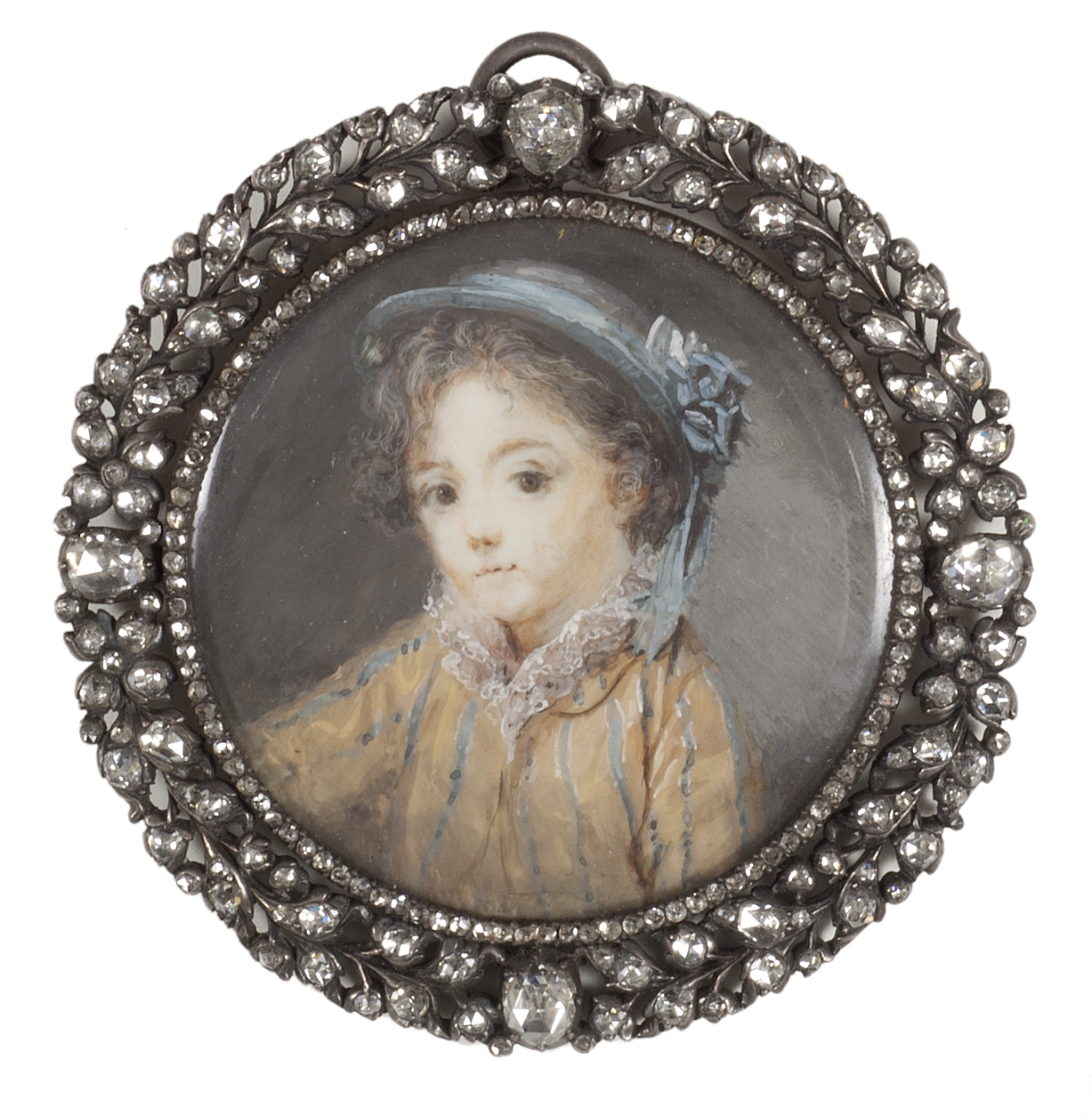
A work by Marie-Anne Fragonard from the collection of the Nationalmuseum, Stockholm.

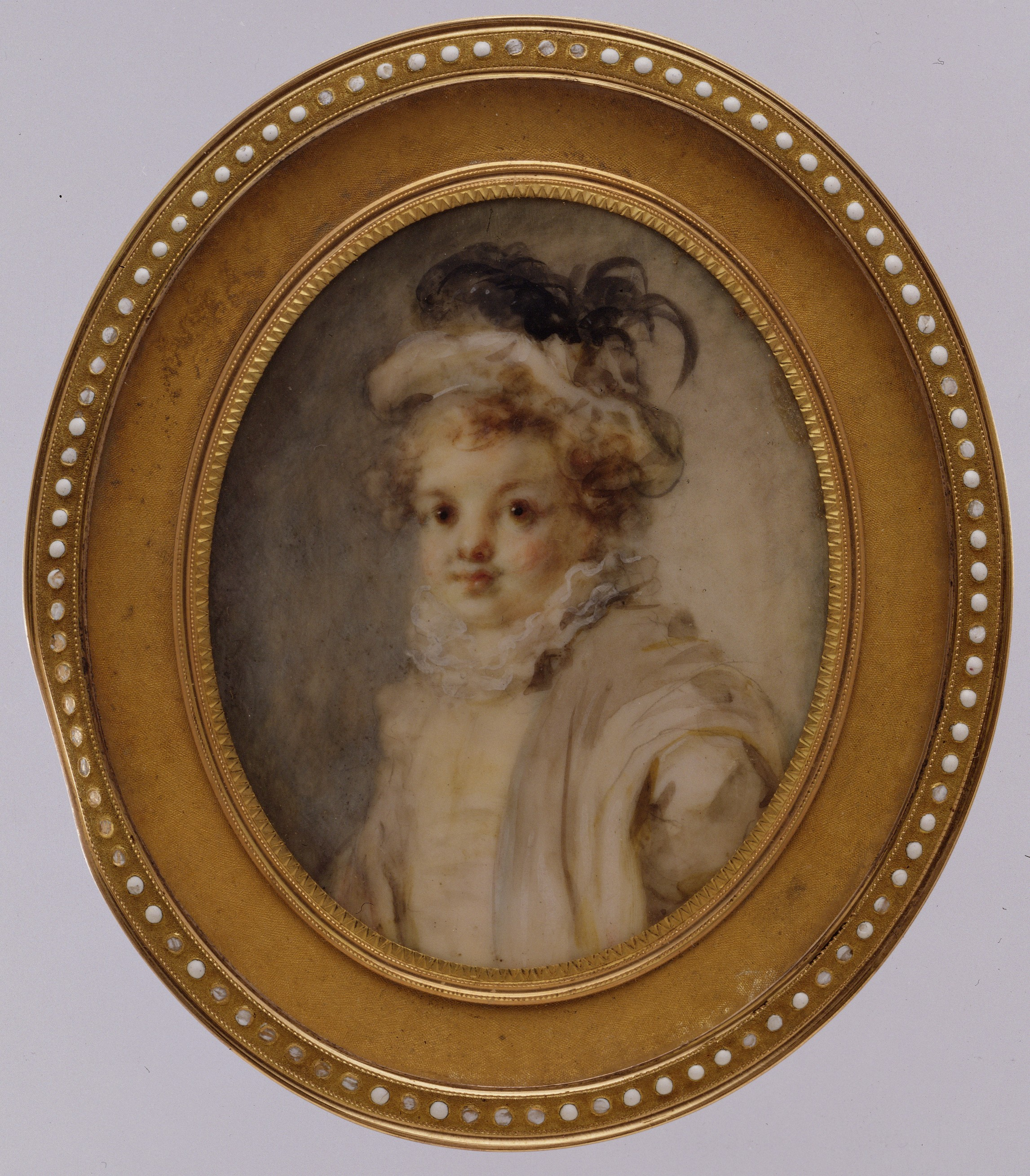
This lively miniature was long thought to have been painted by Jean Honoré Fragonard (1732–1806). Today, it is attributed to Marie Anne Fragonard.

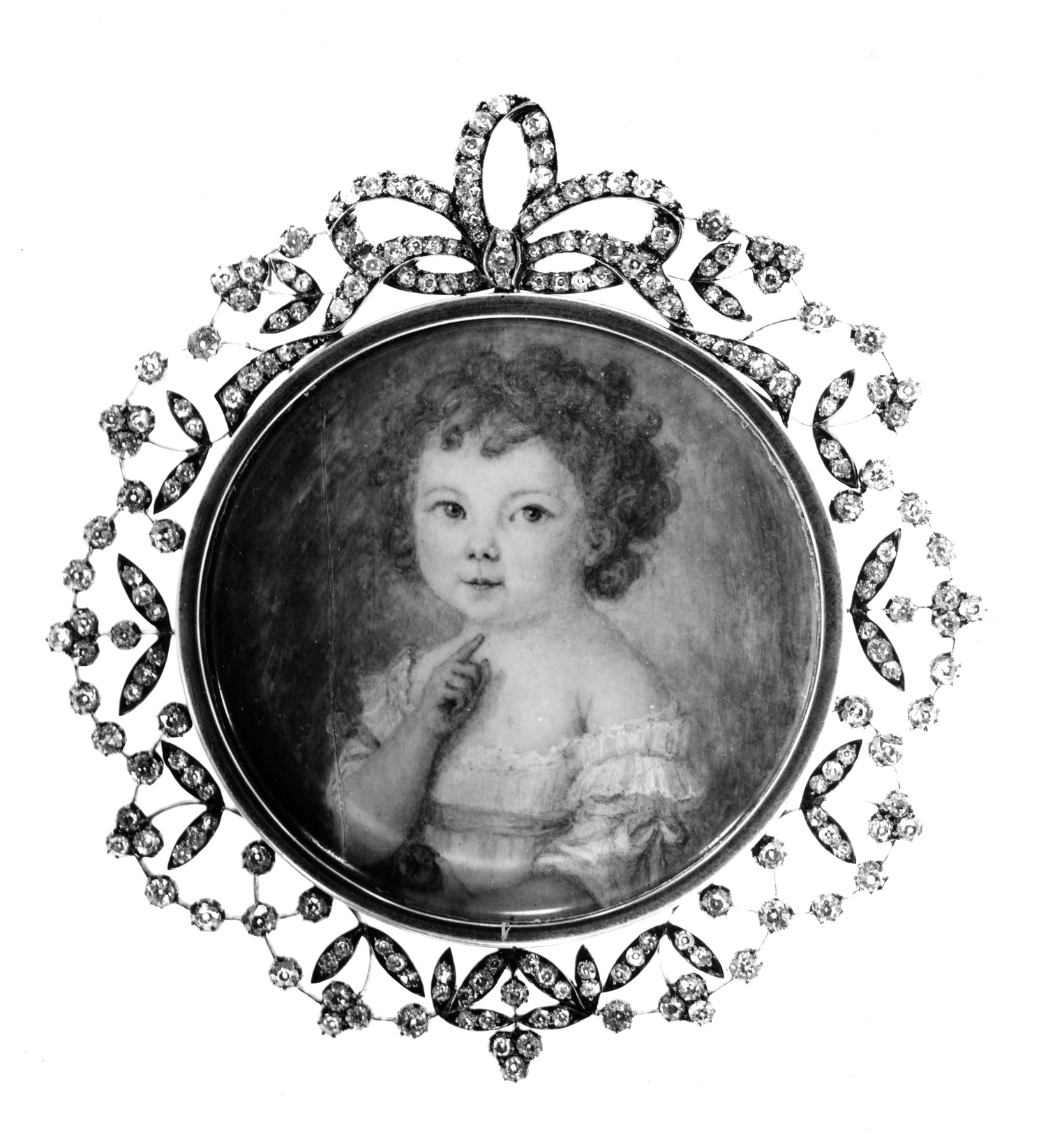
Marie-Anne Fragonard never signed her work, and scholars now suspect that many miniatures, such as this one, once ascribed to her more famous husband are actually her work. The relative clumsiness of this miniature compared to the painterly verve and charm associated with Jean-Honoré Fragonard's graceful art makes the attribution to J.-H. Fragonard unlikely.

== See also ==
- Marguerite Gérard (sister)
