= A Young Girl Reading =

Painting by Jean-Honoré Fragonard

Young Girl Reading
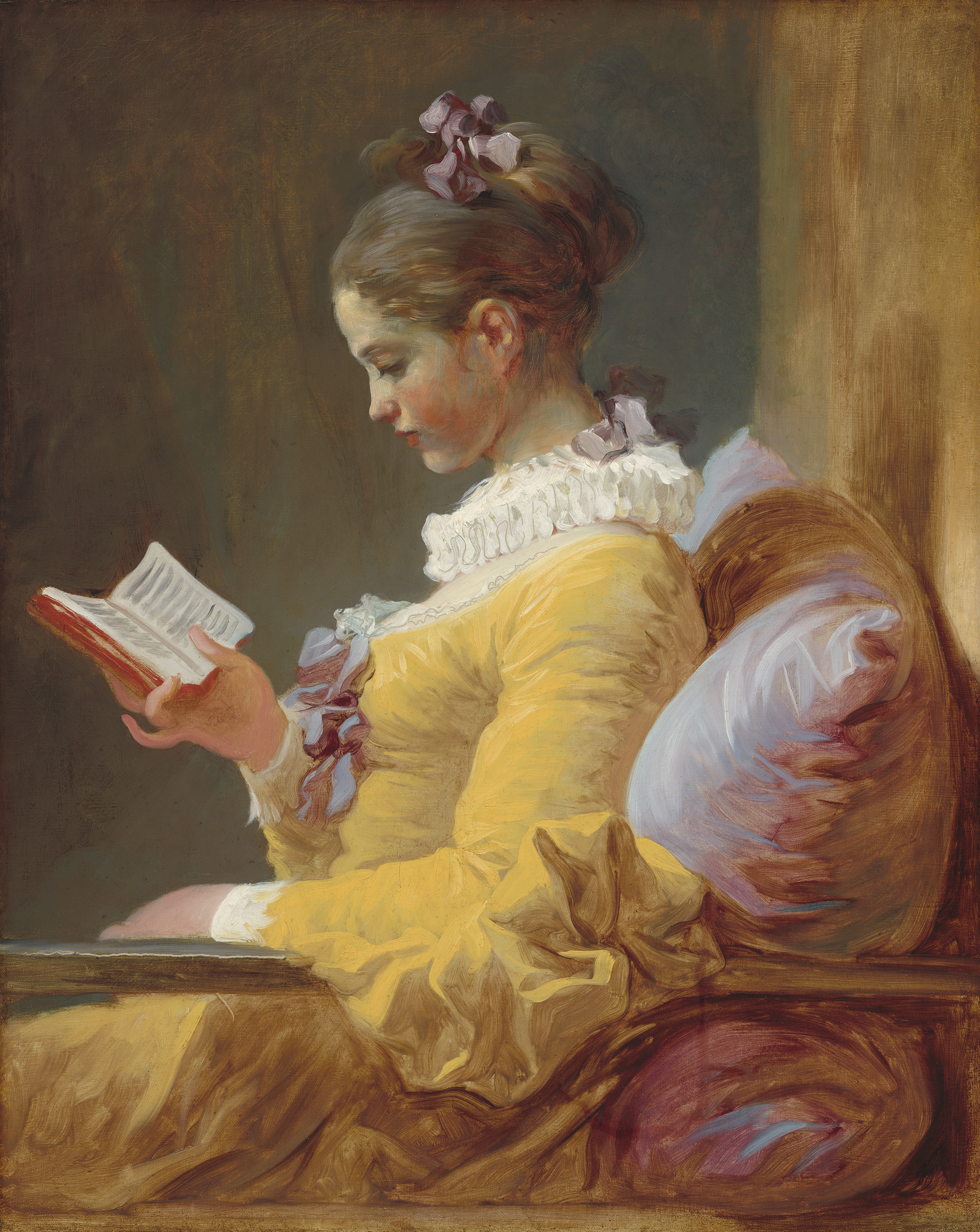
- Artist: Jean-Honoré Fragonard
- Year: c. 1770
- Medium: Oil-on-canvas
- Dimensions: 81.1 cm × 64.8 cm (31 15/16 in × 25 1/2 in)
- Location: National Gallery of Art, Washington, D.C., United States

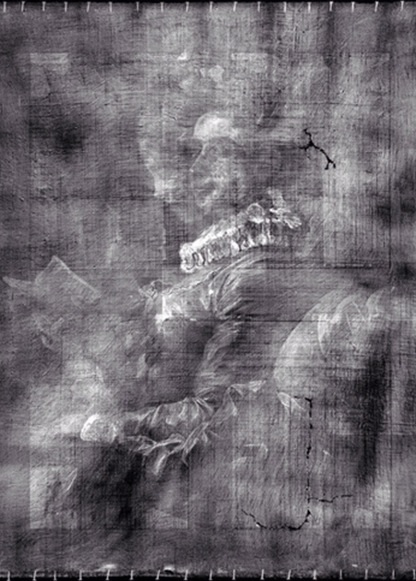
X-ray of painting showing original pose.

Young Girl Reading, or The Reader (French: La Liseuse), is an 18th-century oil painting by Jean-Honoré Fragonard. It depicts an unidentified girl seated in profile, wearing a lemon yellow dress with white ruff collar and cuffs and purple ribbons, and reading from a small book held in her right hand. The painting is in the National Gallery of Art in Washington, DC.

== History ==
Jean-Honoré Fragonard had an extensive career. After he won the 1753 Prix de Rome with a painting titled Jeroboam Sacrificing to Idols, he became one of the foremost French painters in the Rococo style, which was filled with light colors, asymmetrical designs, and curved, natural forms. The Rococo style emerged in Paris during the eighteenth century, more specifically during the reign of Louis XV, when the French upper class experienced a new social and intellectual freedom. As Petra ten-Doesschate Chu stated, "Aristocrats and wealthy bourgeois focused on play and pleasure. Grace and wit were prized in social interactions. A new intellectual curiosity gave rise to a healthy skepticism toward well-worn truths." Fragonard was most drawn to the playful lives and loves of the aristocratic youth of his day.

The painting was purchased by the National Gallery of Art in Washington, DC in 1961 using funds donated by Ailsa Mellon Bruce, the daughter of Andrew W. Mellon, following her father's death. Ailsa Mellon Bruce was a well-known socialite in Manhattan and gained recognition in the art world from the numerous generous donations she gave to a variety of museums and art programs.

== Painting ==
In Young Girl Reading, color helps convey emotion and mood. Fragonard used a typical Rococo color scheme, which consisted of soft, delicate colors and hues of gold. The pillow's violet tint, the darker-toned walls and armrest, and the female subject's rosy-toned skin and bright-yellow dress help create the illusion of warmth and joy, and a sense of sensuality. These bright colors present a strong contrast to the dark background and help the viewer home in on the curves and contours of the female form. Texture is created through Fragonard's loose, but energetic and gestural brushstrokes, as in the frills in the girl's dress. Texture helps create depth and contrast among different elements of the painting—for example, the walls, the dress, and armrest all have different textures created through different styles of brushstrokes.

The work is more a genre painting of an everyday scene than a portrait, and the name of the sitter is not known. X-ray photography has revealed that the canvas originally featured a different head looking towards the viewer, which Fragonard painted over. It is one in a series of quickly executed paintings by Fragonard featuring young girls, known as figures de fantaisie.

The painting was not a completed academic work, and probably passed through the hands of several collectors and dealers in France. It was owned by surgeon Théodore Tuffier, and came to the US before 1930, when it was in the collection of Alfred W. Erickson in New York, founder of the advertising agency McCann Erickson. It was inherited by his wife Anna Edith McCann Erickson in 1936, and following her death in 1961 it was bought by the National Gallery of Art.

== See also ==
- List of works by Fragonard
- La Liseuse
