= The Bolt (Fragonard) =

1777 painting by Jean-Honoré Fragonard

- Artist: Jean-Honoré Fragonard
- Year: 1777
- Catalogue: GW 495; C 336
- Medium: oil on canvas
- Dimensions: 73.5 cm × 93.5 cm (28.9 in × 36.8 in)
- Location: Louvre, Paris
- Accession: RF 1974-2

The Bolt (French: Le Verrou), also known as The Lock, is a galant scene painted by Jean-Honoré Fragonard in 1777. It is one of the most famous paintings by the painter. The scene depicts a man and a woman entwined in a bedroom, the man reaching to the lock on the door. One interpretation suggests the scene shows two lovers embracing in a bedroom, with the man sliding the door bolt shut. Another interpretation posits that the scene depicts a rape, with the woman attempting to break free from the man's grasp as he locks the door to have his way with her.

The painting is preserved in the Louvre Museum, in the section of the Department of Paintings devoted to eighteenth-century French painting. This painting, a symbol of the libertine spirit of the 18th century, reflects the state of mind adopted by the painters of the era, notably that of François Boucher, one of Fragonard's teachers and a great representative of rococo painting.

== Description ==
The canvas measures 73 × 93 cm. It depicts a couple: the woman, dressed in a golden satin gown, may be either trying to break free from, or alternatively struggling, in the partially-dressed man's grasp. He is reaching for the eponymous bolt of the door. The room is in great disarray, with an unmade bed and an overturned chair. Several elements catch the eye—notably an apple resting in the light of the chiaroscuro. Light falls upon the couple like a dramatic spotlight, while canopy drapes—positioned just out of frame—further heighten the impression of a theatrical scene; indeed, the fabric accounts for more than half of the total painted surface.

=== Interpretation ===
All the figures' movements are directed toward the bolt. The man's left arm embraces the woman, while his right arm reaches toward the bolt. The woman also extends an arm toward the bolt; it is unclear whether she intends to close it herself or is attempting to flee. This raises the question of whether we are witnessing a scene of lovemaking or of rape. Proponents of the former theory point to the disarray of the bed and the man's attire. Those favouring the latter, view the young woman's apparent agitation as evidence of coercion.

The central debate surrounding the work—which has sometimes been titled The Rape—revolves around whether or not the sexual act has already taken place.

== History ==
=== Commissioned work ===
The work was commissioned in 1773 by Louis-Gabriel Véri-Raionard, Marquis de Véri (1722–1785). Having been produced for such a reputable and demanding collector, this erotic painting, ostensibly light but asserting a real ambition, formed part of a collection of depictions that were amorous, at times coarse and yet eminently representative of the spirit of French society at a time when the Enlightenment movement was about to waver. The canvas seemed to unveil a profound revitalisation of Fragonard's inspiration that first distinguished itself in historical paintings, in particular Jeroboam Sacrificing to Idols, which won gained the Prix de Rome in 1752. Obtaining this distinction allowed Fragonard to enjoy great fame. His scenes in the galant style were extremely popular, and the nobility offered him many commissions, like that of Baron Saint-Julian for The Swing (1767).

Originally, Fragonard had given The Bolt a more suitable twin: The Contract, itself following on from another called The Armoire. The painting, which belonged to the Marquis of Véri's collection, is known today from an etching by Maurice Blot, who had, 8 years previously, made an etching of The Bolt. This print, considered as mediocre, had great success, however, attributable in large part to the fame of Fragonard. Indeed, a theory claimed that the two works, The Contract and The Bolt, constitute, along with The Armoire, the three chapters of a novel in which the heroes would be the two lovers. The Bolt illustrated the passion of the couple, The Armoire, the discovery of their affair and being caught in the act, and The Contract, their reconciliation. The Bolt is often also considered alongside the religious The Adoration of the Shepherds (1775).

== See also ==
- List of works by Fragonard
