= Adoration of the Shepherds (Fragonard) =

1775 painting by Jean-Honoré Fragonard

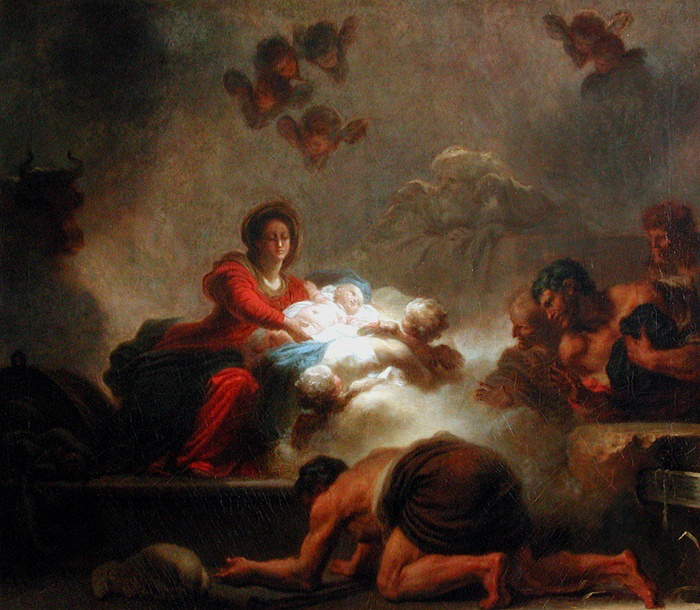
- Artist: Jean-Honoré Fragonard
- Year: 1775
- Medium: Oil on canvas
- Dimensions: 73 cm × 93 cm (29 in × 37 in)
- Location: Louvre; Paris

Adoration of the Shepherds is an oil on canvas painting by Jean-Honoré Fragonard, from 1775. It was previously misattributed to François Boucher. It was donated to the Louvre in 1988.

It is sometimes considered as a pendant to the far more secular The Bolt, as both works were commissioned by Louis-Gabriel Véri-Raionard, marquis de Véri (1722–1785). Fragonard suggested its subject, showing his wish to revive religious art and illustrate contrasts between contemporary carnal love and sacred religious love.

== See also ==
- List of works by Fragonard
