= The Woman with a Dog =

1769 painting by Jean-Honoré Fragonard

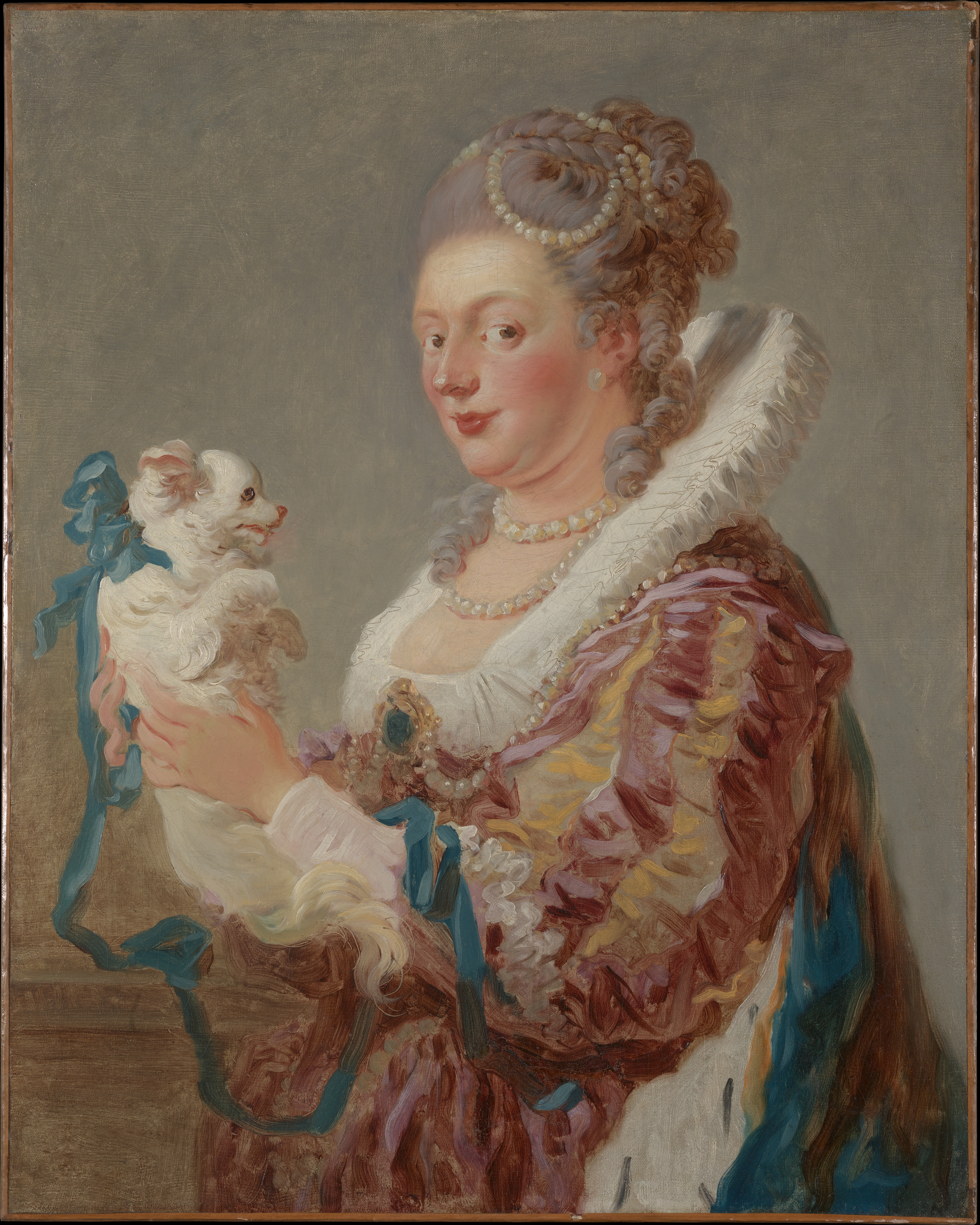
"The Woman with A Dog" – 1769, The Metropolitan Museum of Art

The Woman With A Dog is an oil on canvas painting created in 1769 by Rococo artist Jean-Honoré Fragonard as part of his Figures de Fantaisie series.

== Short description ==
The Woman With A Dog belongs to Fragonard's Figures de Fantaisie (Fantasy Figures) series, with artworks often painted within an hour. While some elements such as the hairstyle, pearls, or the blue and pink colors correspond to the Rococo style, the dress itself is in a 16th/17th-century style, and has been compared to Rubens' portraits of Marie de Médici or Anne of Austria. The dog and woman were given similar curly features, contrasting with their vastly different sizes in a humorous juxtaposition. In this piece of art, the dog seems to look at the woman with adornment, while the woman looks at the viewer with a cheeky expression and flushed cheeks. The model was originally believed to be Fragonard's sister or aunt, but has recently been identified as Marie Emilie Coignet de Courson.

Today, the painting is housed in the Metropolitan Museum of Art in New York.

== See also ==
- List of works by Fragonard
