= Jean-Honoré Fragonard =

French Rococo painter (1732–1806)

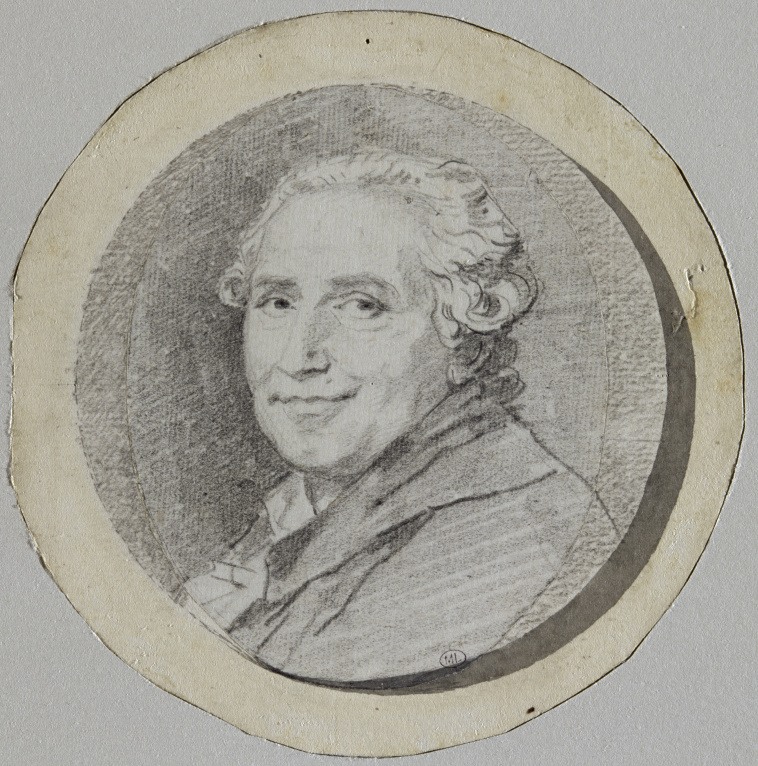
- Self-Portrait, 1780s, black chalk with gray wash
- Born: 5 April 1732; Grasse, France
- Died: 22 August 1806 (aged 74); Paris, France
- Education: Jean-Siméon Chardin; François Boucher; Charles-André van Loo; French Academy in Rome
- Known for: Painting, drawing, etching
- Notable work: The Swing, A Young Girl Reading, The Bolt
- Movement: Rococo
- Spouse: Marie-Anne Gérard (m. 1768)
- Children: 2, including Alexandre-Évariste Fragonard
- Awards: Prix de Rome

Jean-Honoré Fragonard (French: [ʒɑ̃ ɔnɔʁe fʁaɡɔnaʁ]; 5 April 1732 – 22 August 1806) was a French painter and printmaker whose late Rococo manner was distinguished by remarkable facility, exuberance, and hedonism. One of the most prolific artists active in the last decades of the Ancien Régime, Fragonard produced more than 550 paintings (not counting drawings and etchings), of which only five are dated. Among his most popular works are genre paintings conveying an atmosphere of intimacy and veiled eroticism.

== Biography ==
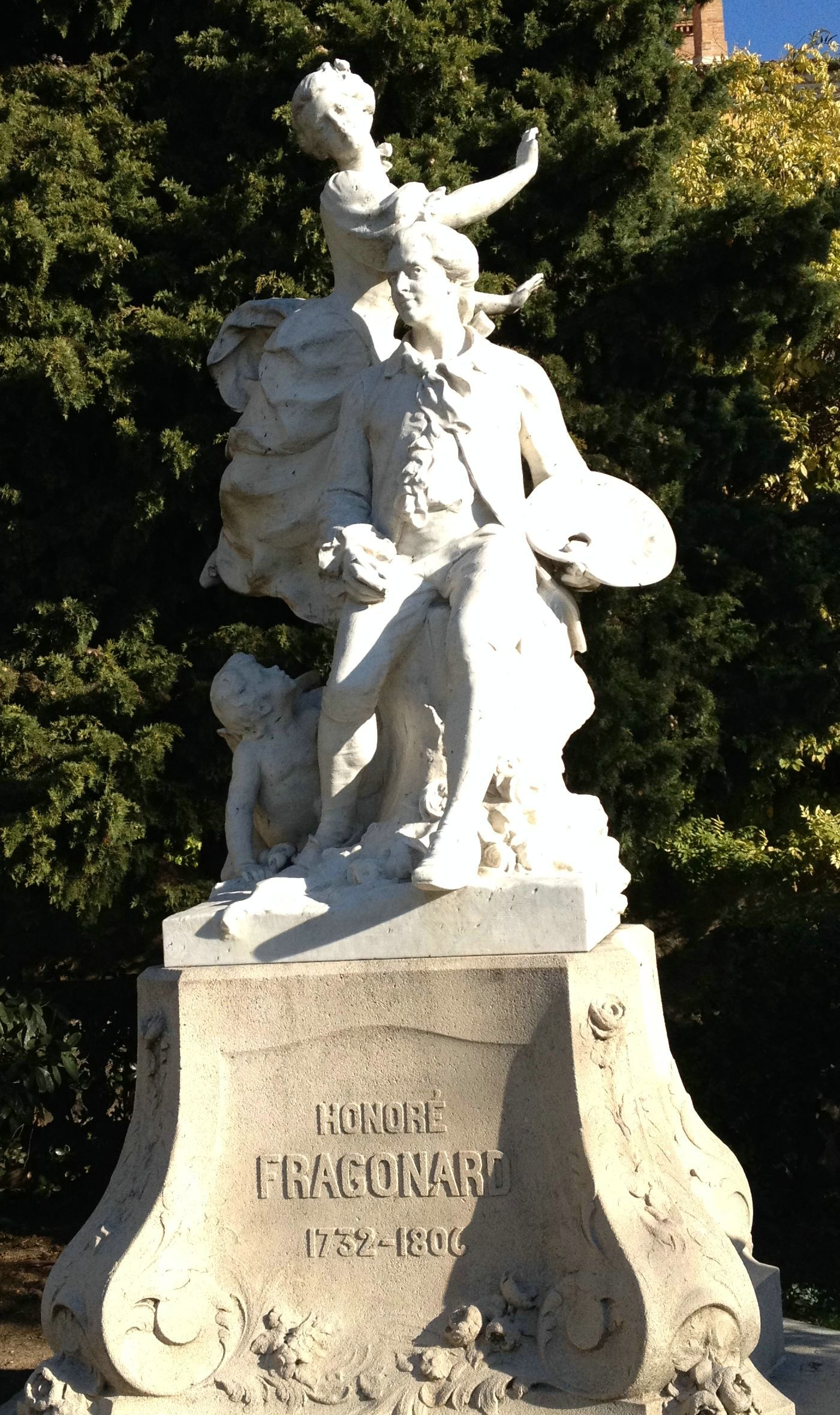
Statue of Fragonard in Grasse, his birthplace

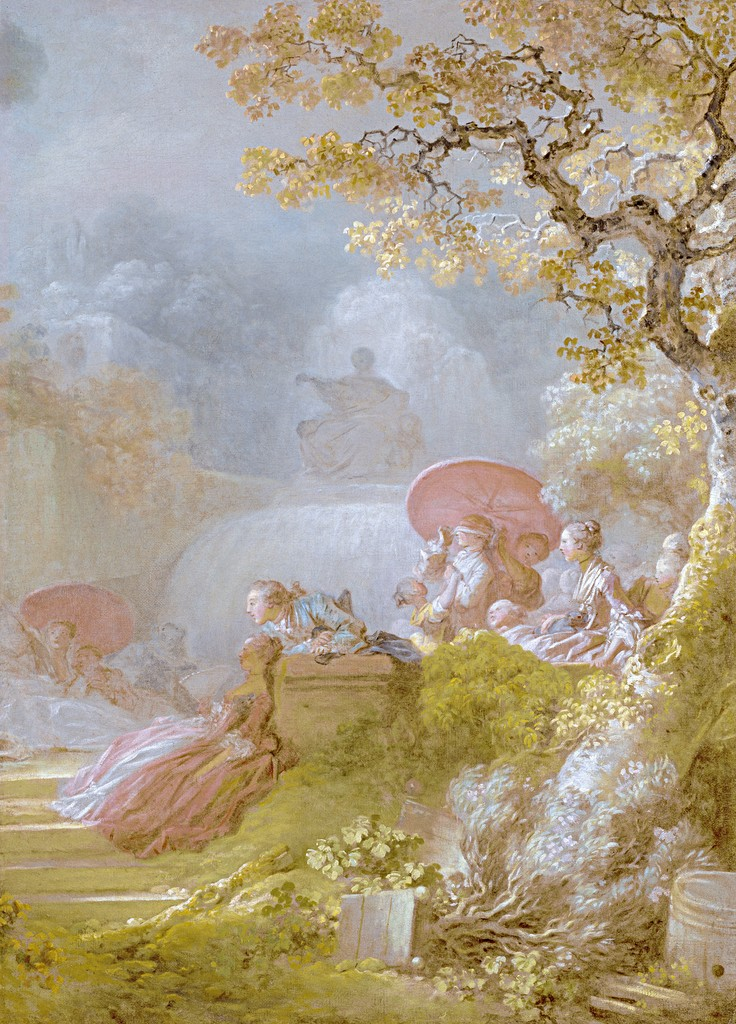
Jean-Honoré Fragonard, Blindman's Buff, 1775–1780, Timken Museum of Art, San Diego

Jean-Honoré Fragonard was born in Grasse, Alpes-Maritimes, France the only child of François Fragonard, a glover, and Françoise Petit. In 1738 the family relocated to Paris. The young Fragonard showed an inclination for art, which was recognized by François Boucher, who recommended him to the atelier of Chardin. Fragonard studied for a short time with Chardin then returned ca. 1749 to Boucher, whose style he soon acquired so completely that the master entrusted him with the execution of replicas of his paintings.

Though not yet a student of the Academy, Fragonard gained the Prix de Rome in 1752 with a painting of Jeroboam Sacrificing to Idols, but before proceeding to Rome he continued to study for three years under Charles-André van Loo. In the year preceding his departure he painted the Christ washing the Feet of the Apostles now at Grasse Cathedral. In December 1756, he took up his abode at the French Academy in Rome, then presided over by Charles-Joseph Natoire.

While at Rome, Fragonard contracted a friendship with a fellow painter Hubert Robert. In 1760, they toured Italy together, executing numerous sketches of local scenery. It was in these romantic gardens, with their fountains, grottoes, temples and terraces, that Fragonard conceived the dreams which he was subsequently to render in his art. He also learned to admire the masters of the Dutch and Flemish schools (Rubens, Hals, Rembrandt, Ruisdael), imitating their loose and vigorous brushstrokes. Added to this influence was the deep impression made upon his mind by the florid sumptuousness of Giovanni Battista Tiepolo, whose works he had an opportunity to study in Venice before he returned to Paris in 1761.

In 1765 his Coresus Sacrificing Himself to Save Callirhoe secured his admission to the Academy. It was made the subject of a pompous (though not wholly serious) eulogy by Denis Diderot, and was bought by the king, who had it reproduced at the Gobelins factory. Until this time Fragonard had hesitated between religious, classic and other subjects, but he did not aspire to become a history painter and he had difficulty completing official commissions. As a consequence, he painted mostly for private patrons or for himself. The demand of the wealthy art patrons of Louis XV's pleasure-loving and licentious court turned him definitely towards those scenes of love and voluptuousness, which are only made acceptable by the tender beauty of his color and the virtuosity of his facile brushwork; such works include the Blind Man's Bluff (Le collin maillard), Serment d'amour (Love Vow), Le Verrou (The Bolt), La Culbute (The Tumble), La Chemise enlevée (The Raised Chemise), and L'escarpolette (The Swing, Wallace Collection), and his decorations for the apartments of Mme du Barry and the dancer Madeleine Guimard.

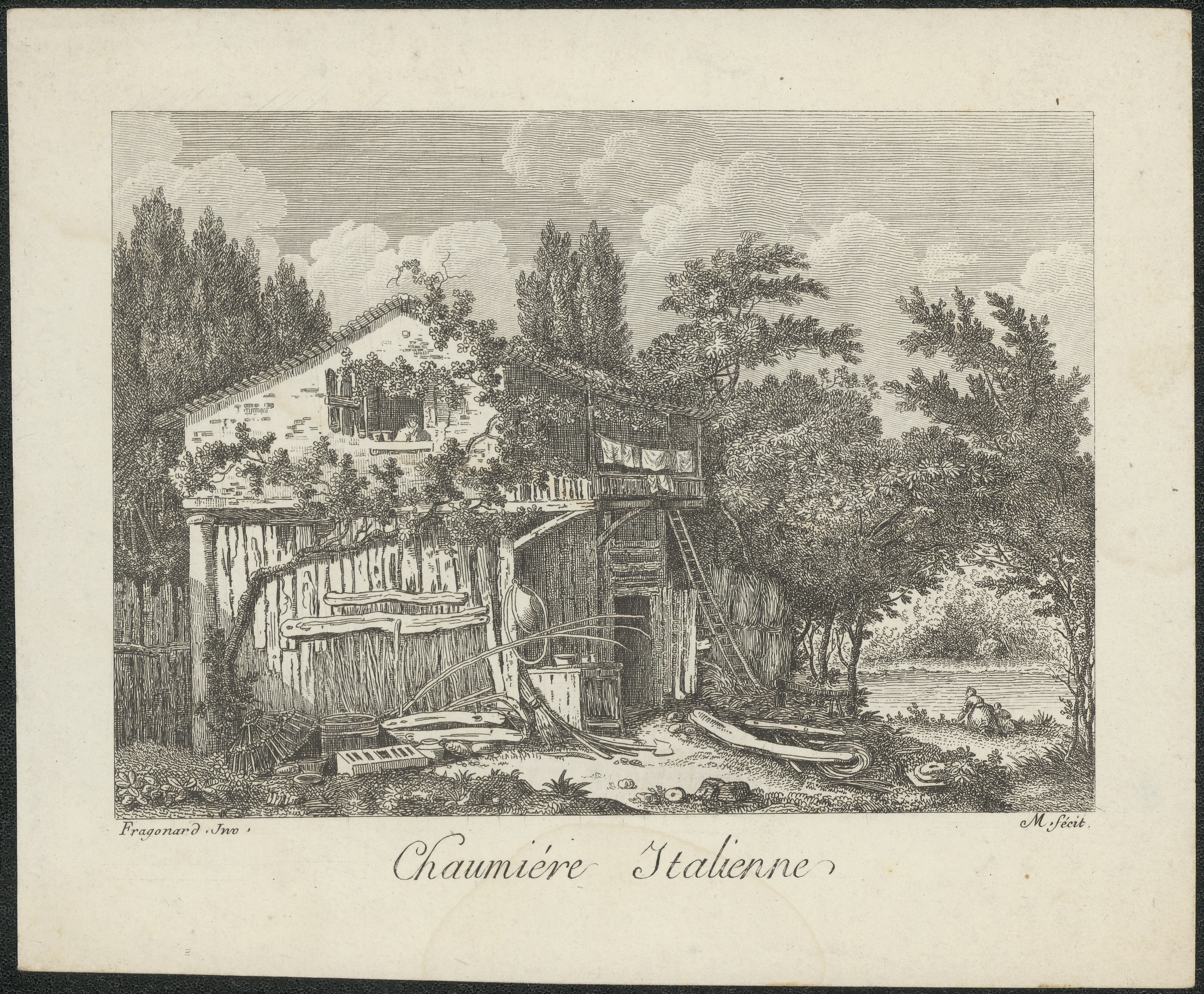
Early engraving after Jean-Honoré Fragonard titled Chaumiére Italienne

A lukewarm response to these series of ambitious works induced Fragonard to abandon the Rococo style and to experiment with Neoclassicism. He married Marie-Anne Gérard (1745–1823), herself a painter of miniatures, on 17 June 1769 and had a daughter, Rosalie Fragonard (1769–1788), who became one of his favourite models. In October 1773, he again went to Italy with Pierre-Jacques Onézyme Bergeret de Grancourt and his son, Pierre-Jacques Bergeret de Grancourt. In September 1774, he returned through Vienna, Prague, Dresden, Frankfurt and Strasbourg.

Back in Paris Marguerite Gérard, his wife's 14-year-old sister, became his student and assistant in 1778. In 1780, he had a son, Alexandre-Évariste Fragonard (1780–1850), who eventually became a talented painter and sculptor. The French Revolution deprived Fragonard of his private patrons: they were either guillotined or exiled. The neglected painter deemed it prudent to leave Paris in 1790 and found shelter in the house of his cousin Alexandre Maubert at Grasse, which he decorated with the series of decorative panels known as the Les progrès de l'amour dans le cœur d'une jeune fille, originally painted for Château du Barry.

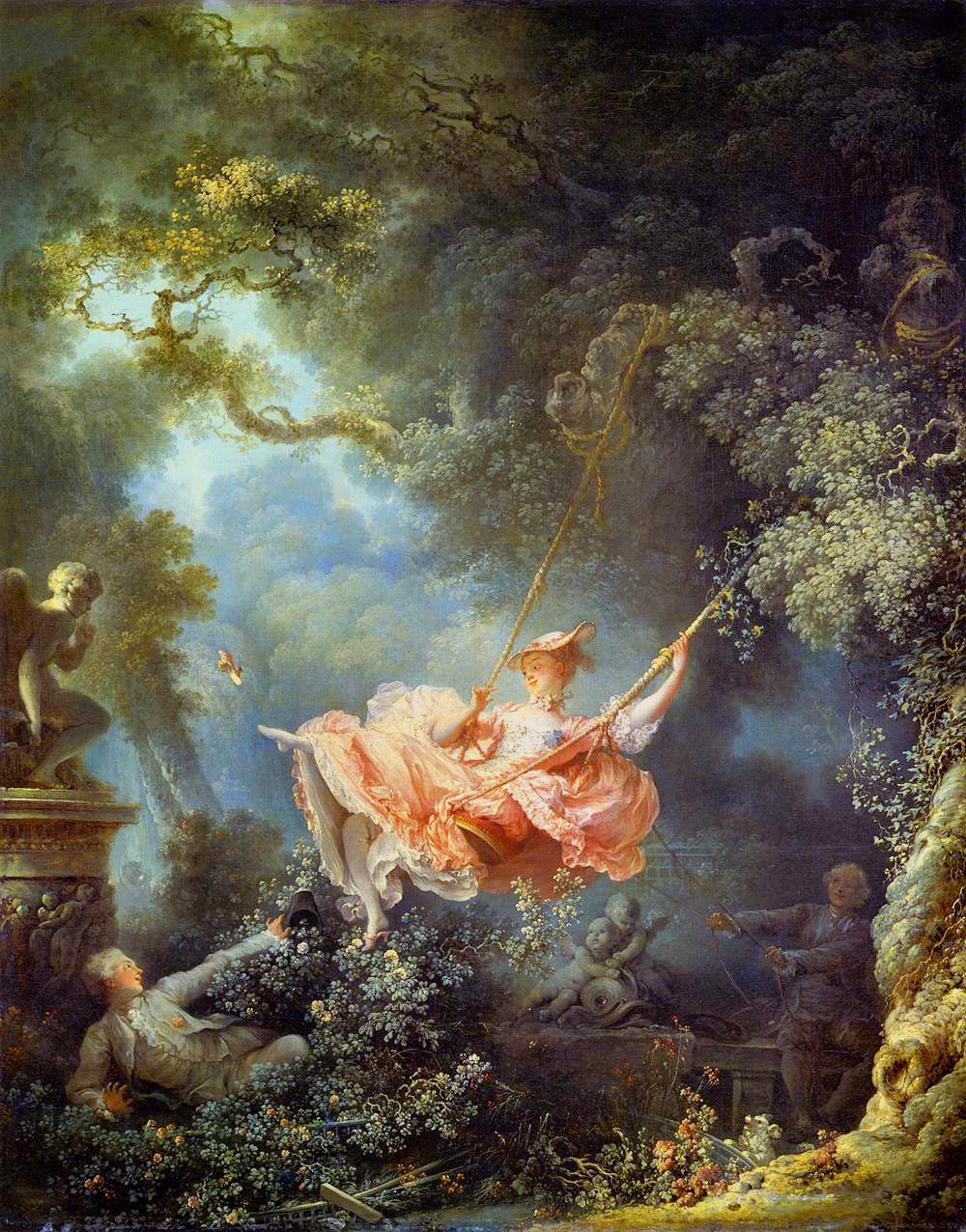
The Swing (French: L'escarpolette), 1767, Wallace Collection, London

== Legacy ==
For half a century or more, Fragonard was so completely ignored that Wilhelm Lübke's 1873 art history volume omits mention of his name. Later re-evaluations have re-identified his position among the all-time masters of French painting. The influence of his handling of local colour and expressive, confident brushstroke on the Impressionists (particularly his grand niece, Berthe Morisot, and Renoir) is undoubtable. Fragonard's paintings, alongside those of François Boucher, seem to sum up an era.

One of Fragonard's most renowned paintings is The Swing, also known as The Happy Accidents of the Swing (its original title), an oil painting in the Wallace Collection in London. It is considered to be one of the masterpieces of the rococo era, and is Fragonard's best-known work. The painting portrays a young gentleman concealed in the bushes, observing a lady on swing being pushed by her spouse, who is standing in the background, hidden in the shadows, as he is unaware of the affair. As the lady swings forward, the young man gets a glimpse under her dress. According to Charles Collé's memoirs a young nobleman had requested this portrait of his mistress seated on a swing. He asked first Gabriel François Doyen to make this painting of him and his mistress. Not comfortable with this frivolous work, Doyen refused and passed on the commission to Fragonard.

The Swing is seemingly referenced in The Great Gatsby by F. Scott Fitzgerald, in which the protagonist Nick Carraway describes an apartment "crowded to the doors with a set of tapestried furniture [... with] scenes of ladies swinging in the gardens of Versailles." Fragonard is also referenced in Milan Kundera's novel Slowness, which talks about Fragonards paintings Progress of Love.

The poem The Lamentation of the Old Pensioner by William Butler Yeats uses the description of a broken tree and a woman that turns her face as an allusion to Fragonard's The Swing, as the branch the woman uses to swing on is broken and facing the viewer.

The Waste Land by T.S Eliot visually depicts the "carvéd dolphin" surmounted by winged cupids in Fragonard’s Progress of Love: The Pursuit.

== Work ==
Jean-Honoré Fragonard

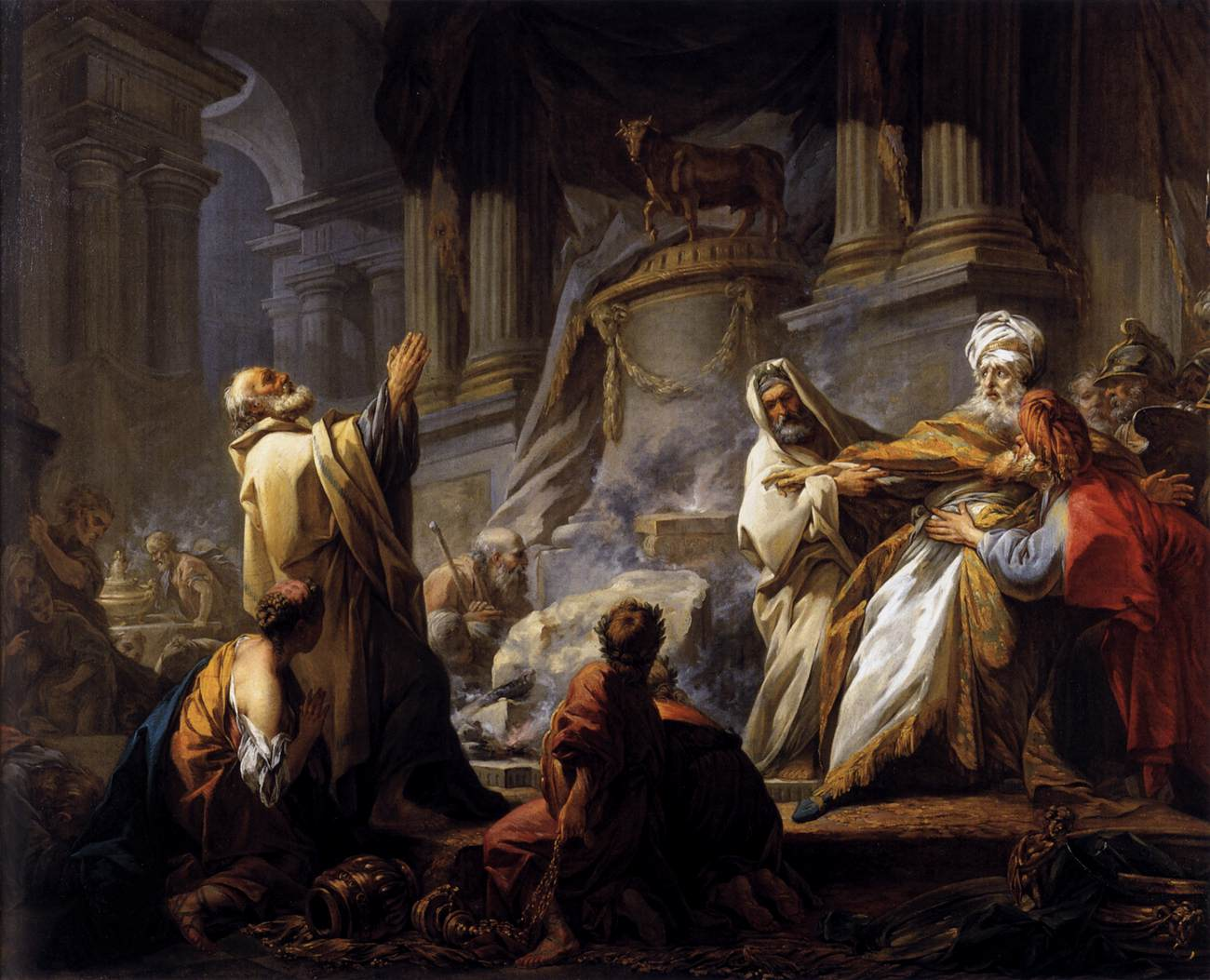
Jeroboam Offering Sacrifice for the Idol, 1752, Beaux-Arts de Paris, Paris

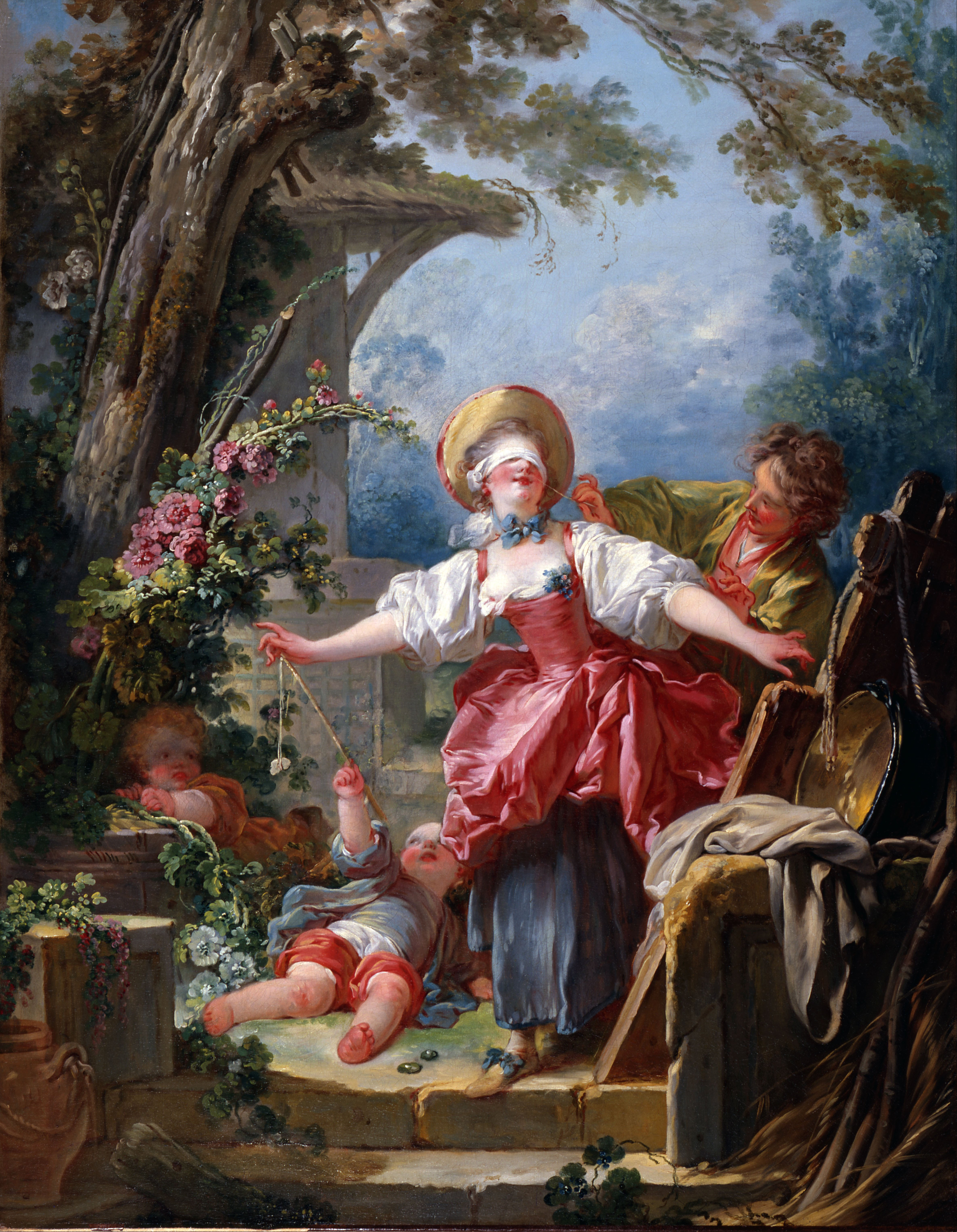
Blind Man's Bluff, 1750–1752, Toledo Museum of Art, Toledo, Ohio

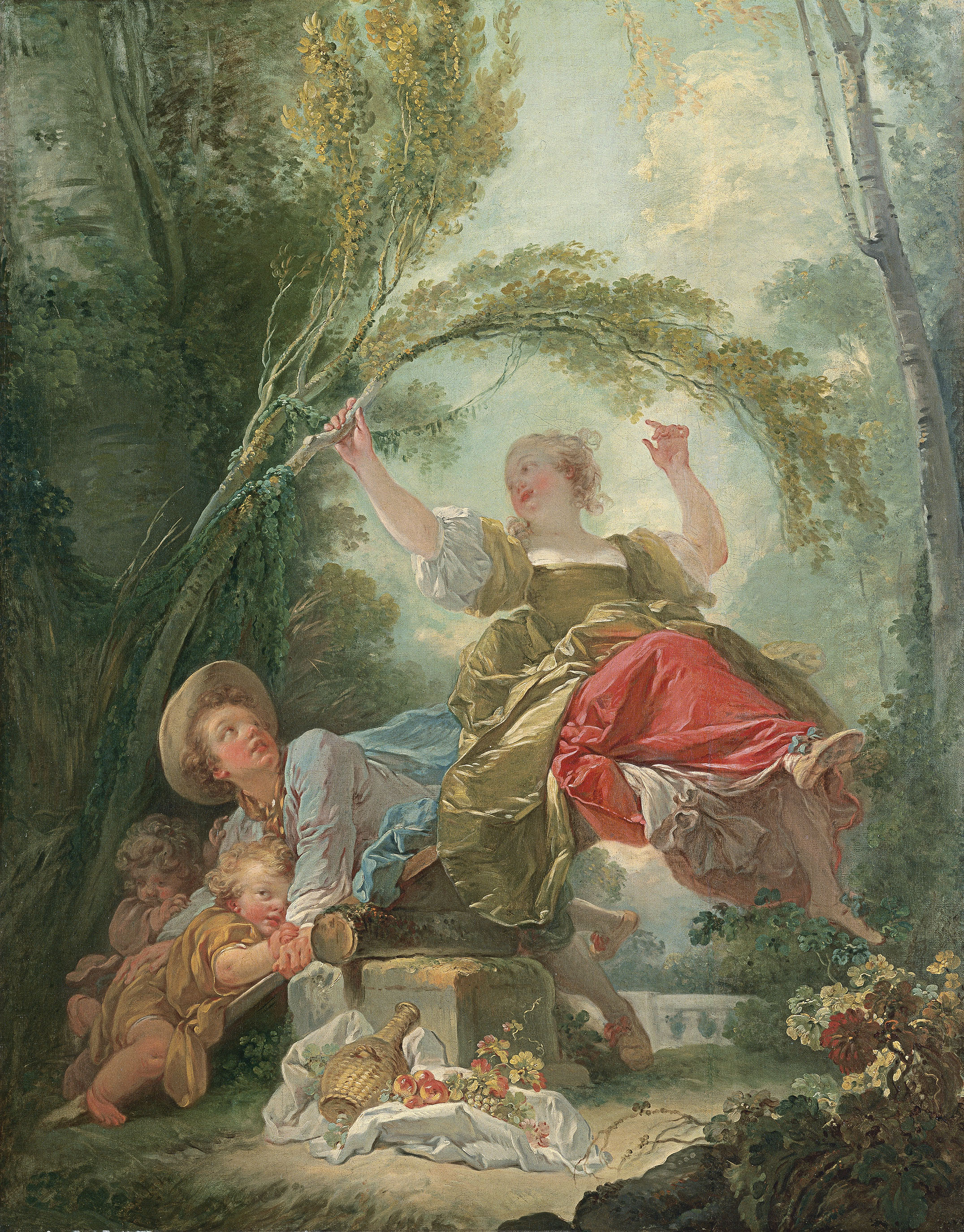
The See-Saw, 1750–1752, Thyssen-Bornemisza Museum, Madrid

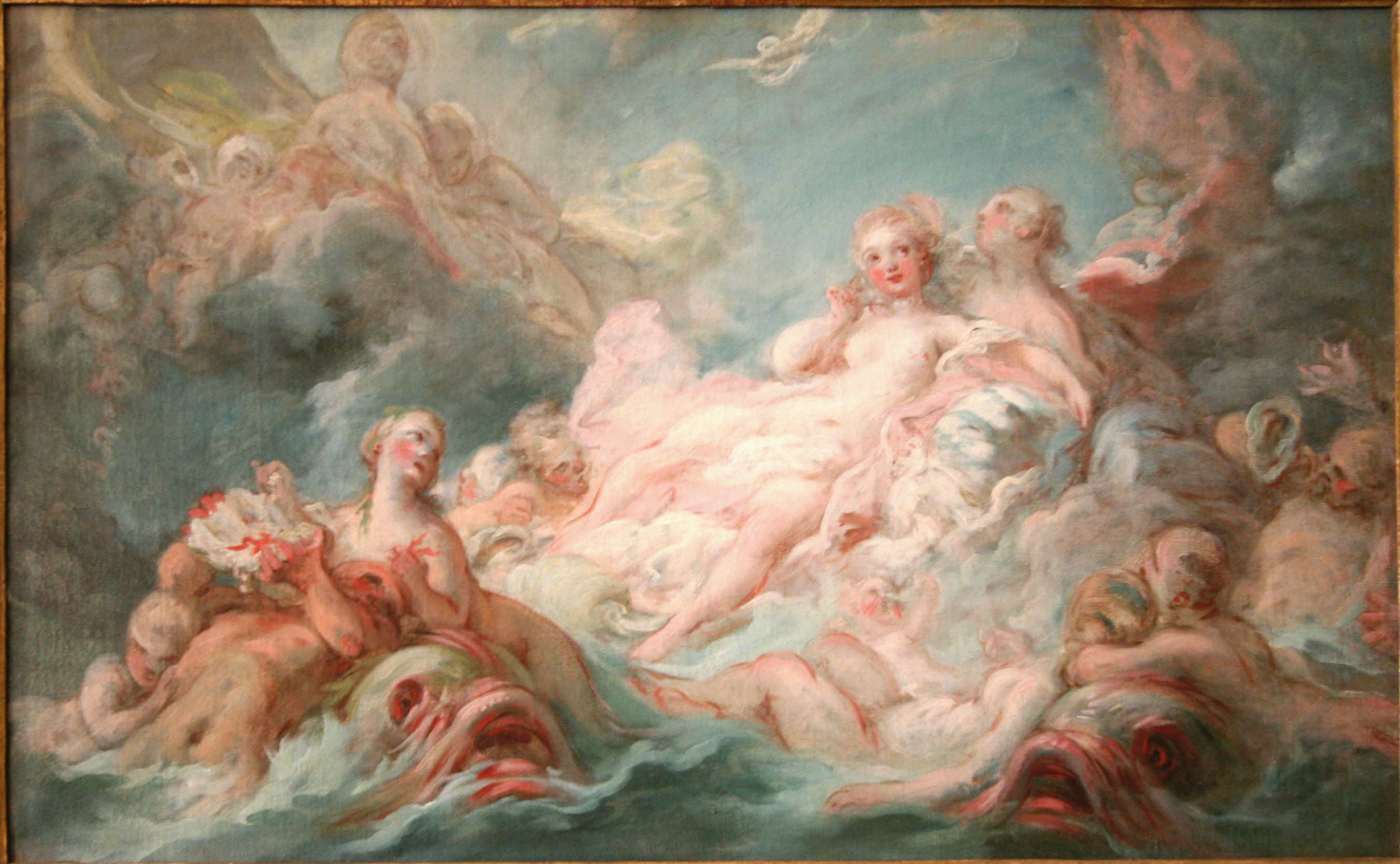
The Birth of Venus, 1753–1755, Musée Grobet-Labadié, Marseille

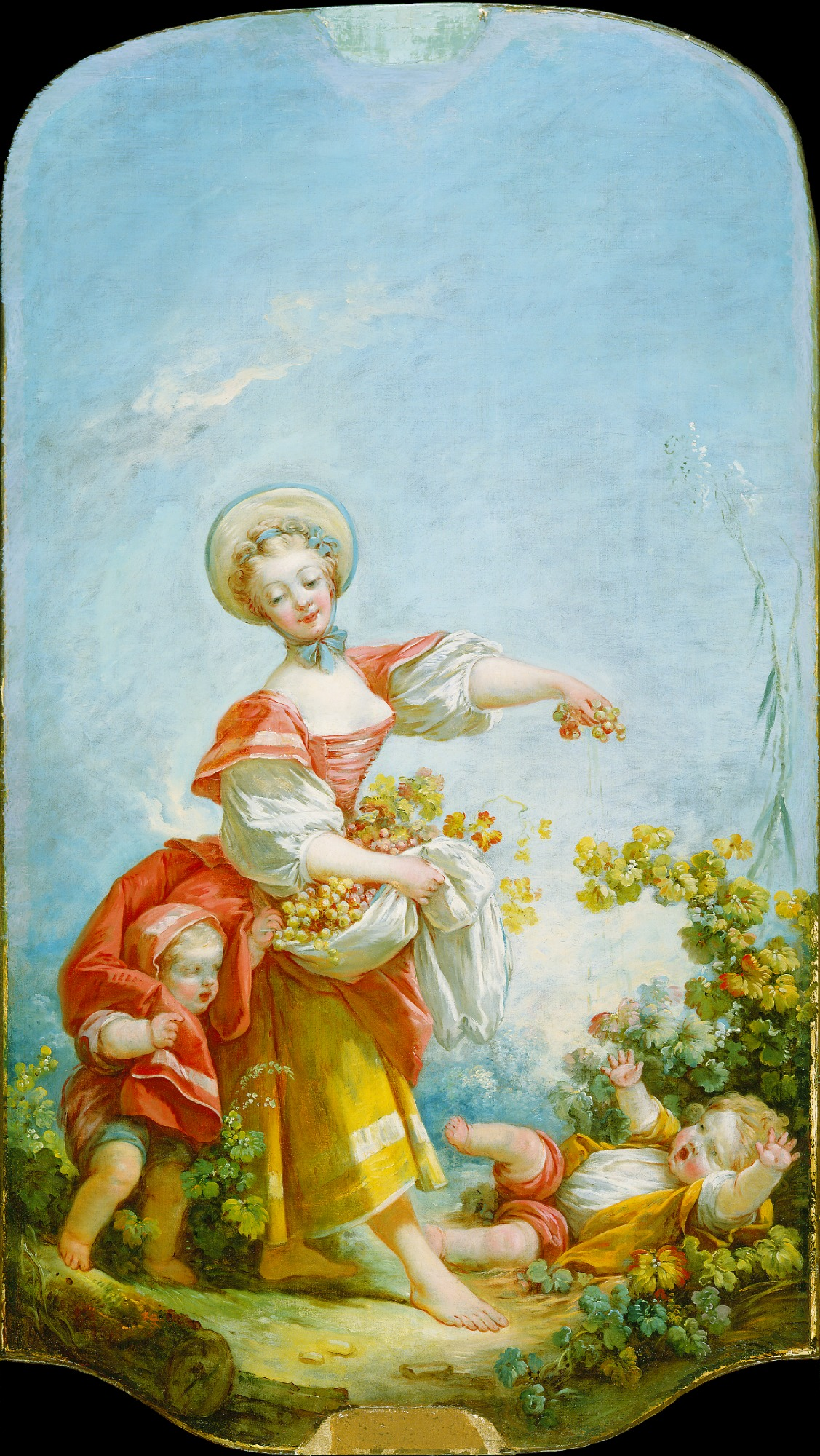
The Grape Gatherer, 1754–1755, Detroit Institute of Art, Detroit, Michigan

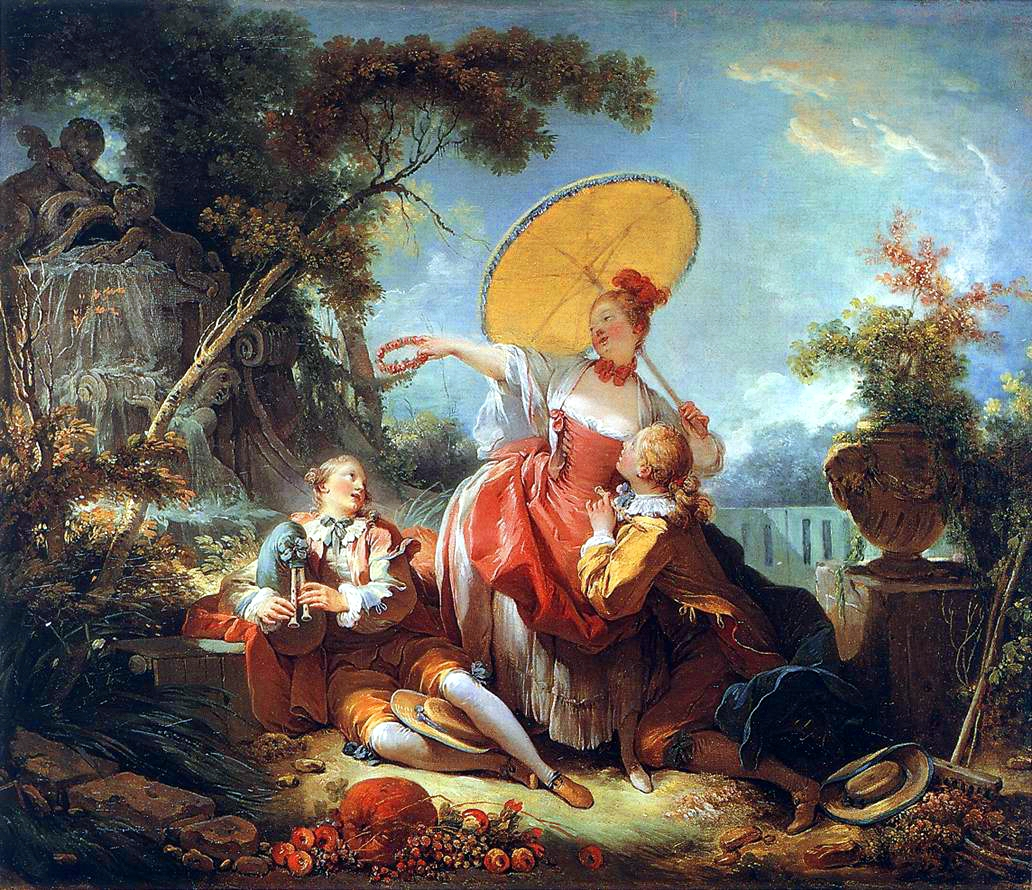
The Musical Contest, 1754–55, Wallace Collection, London

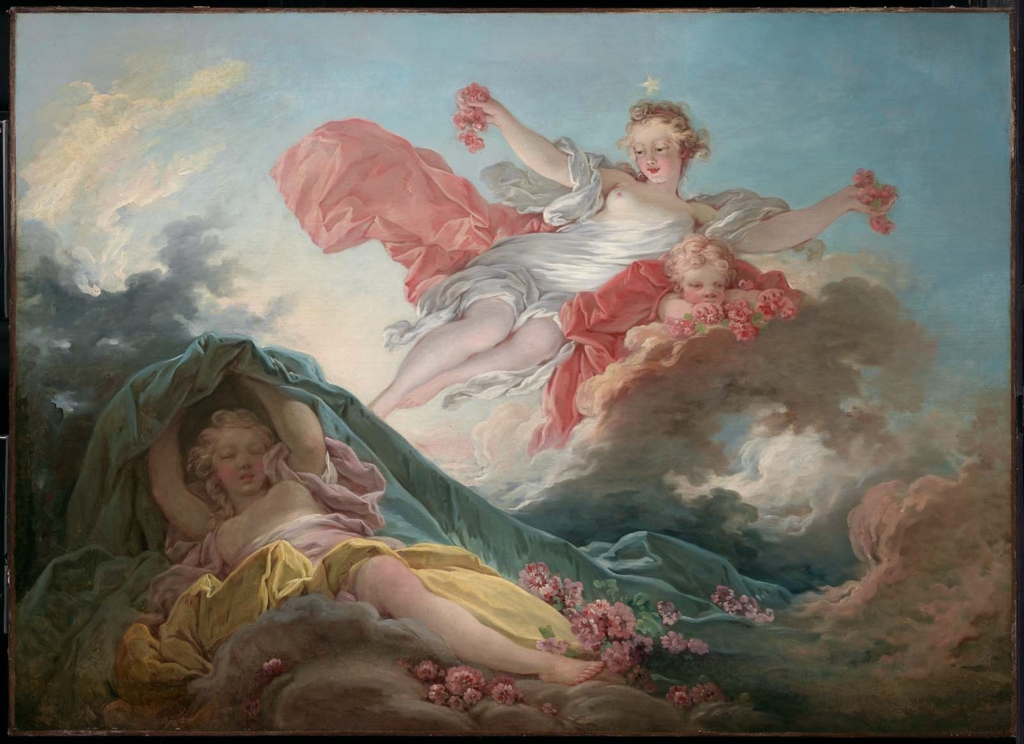
Aurora Triumphing over Night, c. 1755–56, Museum of Fine Arts, Boston

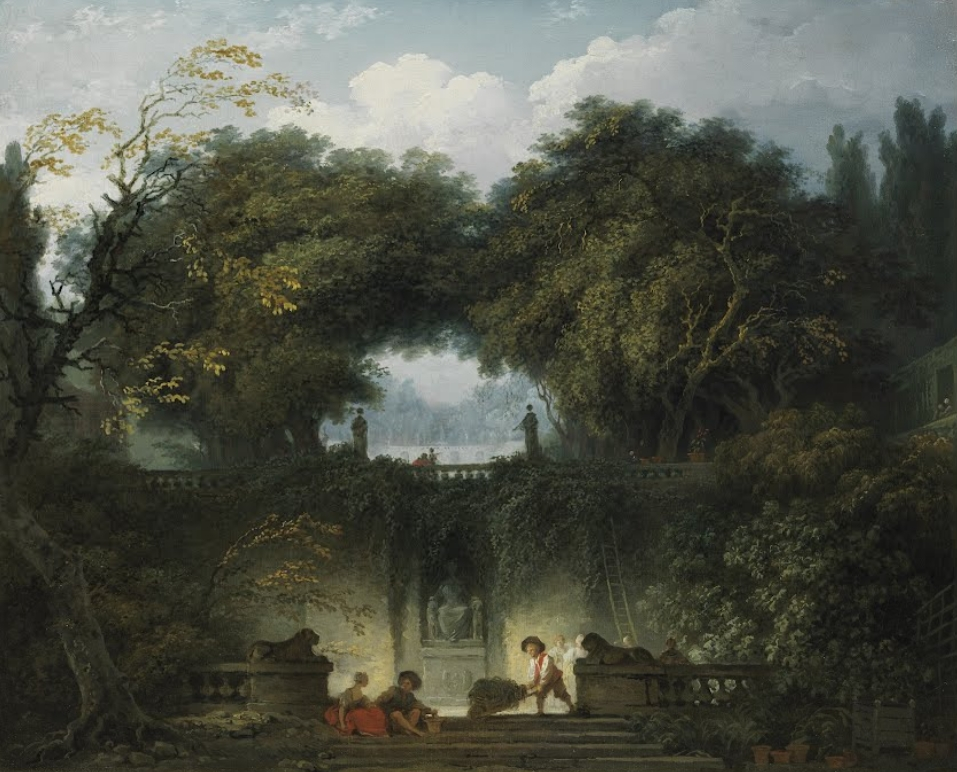
The Little Park, 1763, Wallace Collection, London

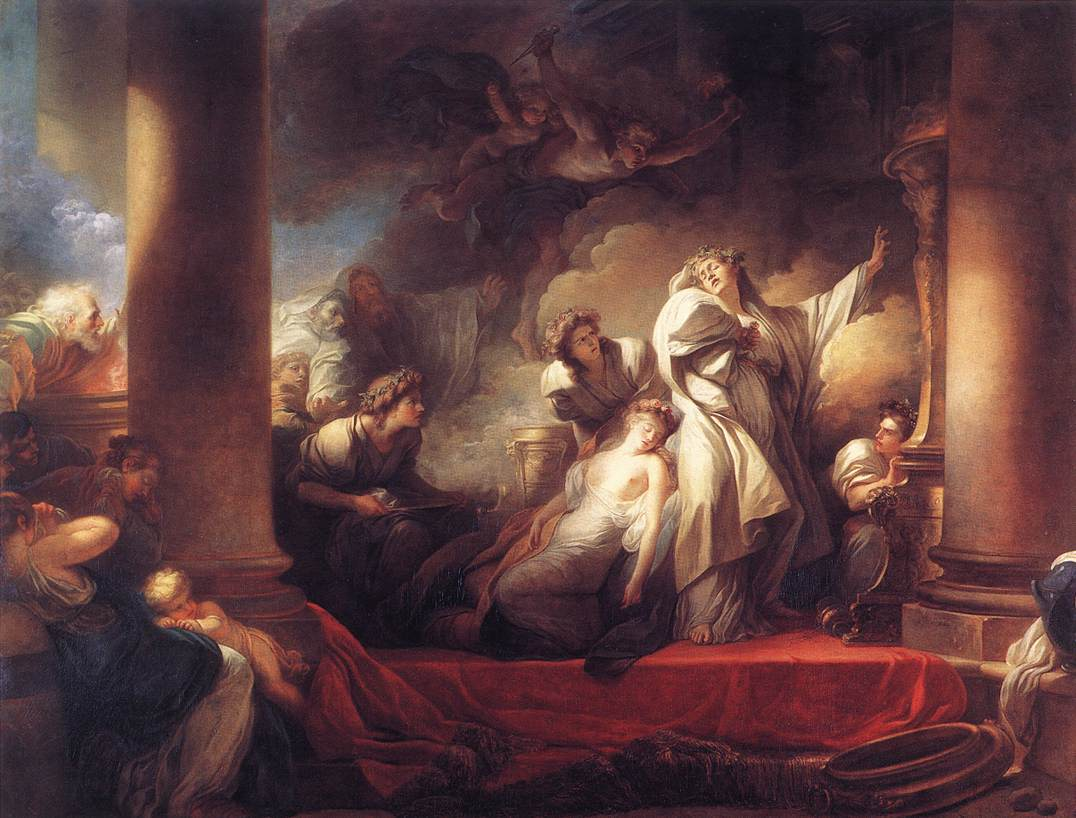
Coresus Sacrificing himself to Save Callirhoe, 1765, Louvre, Paris

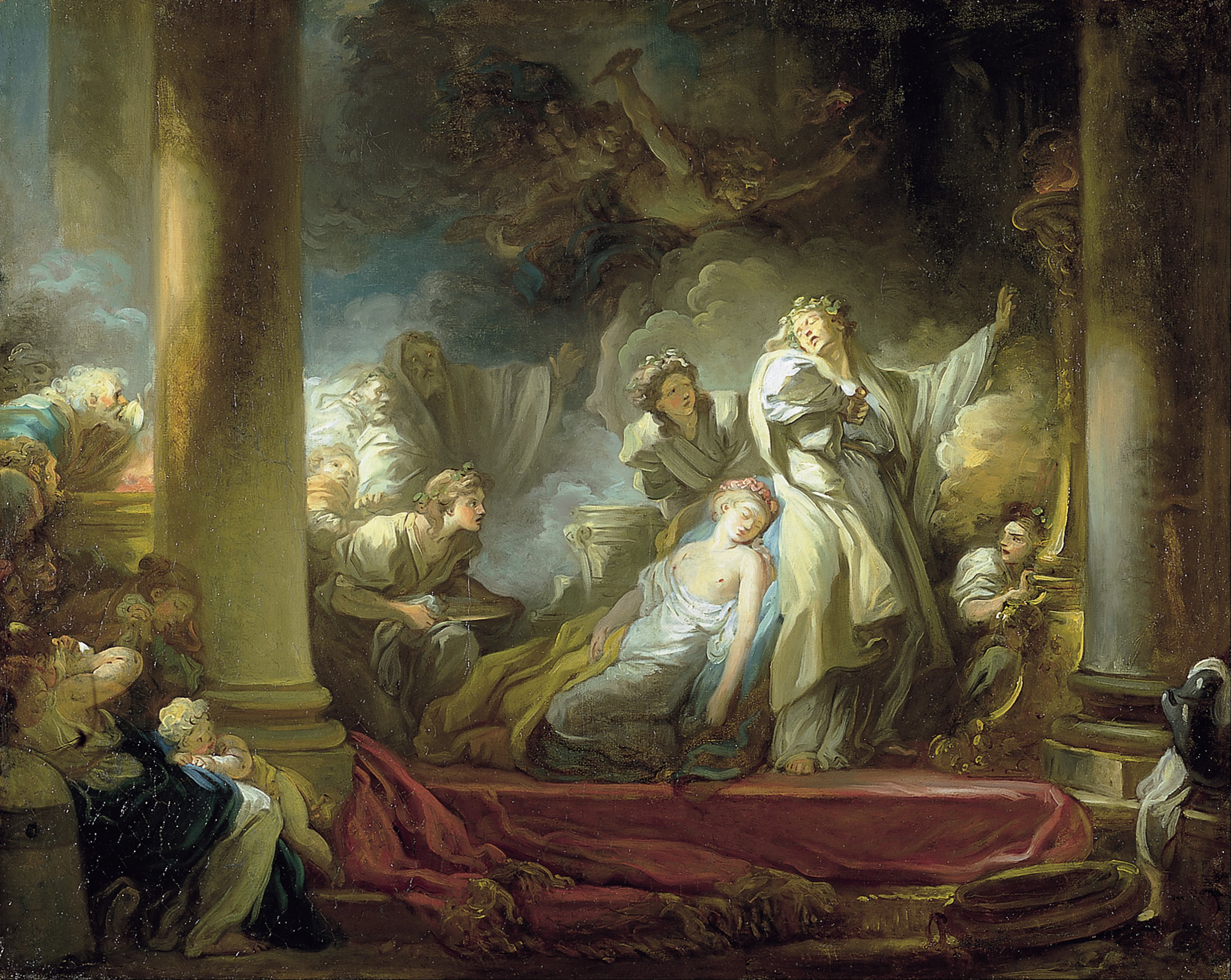
Callirhoe's Sacrifice. Real Academia de Bellas Artes de San Fernando, Madrid. (ricordo from the large Coresus and Callirhoë)

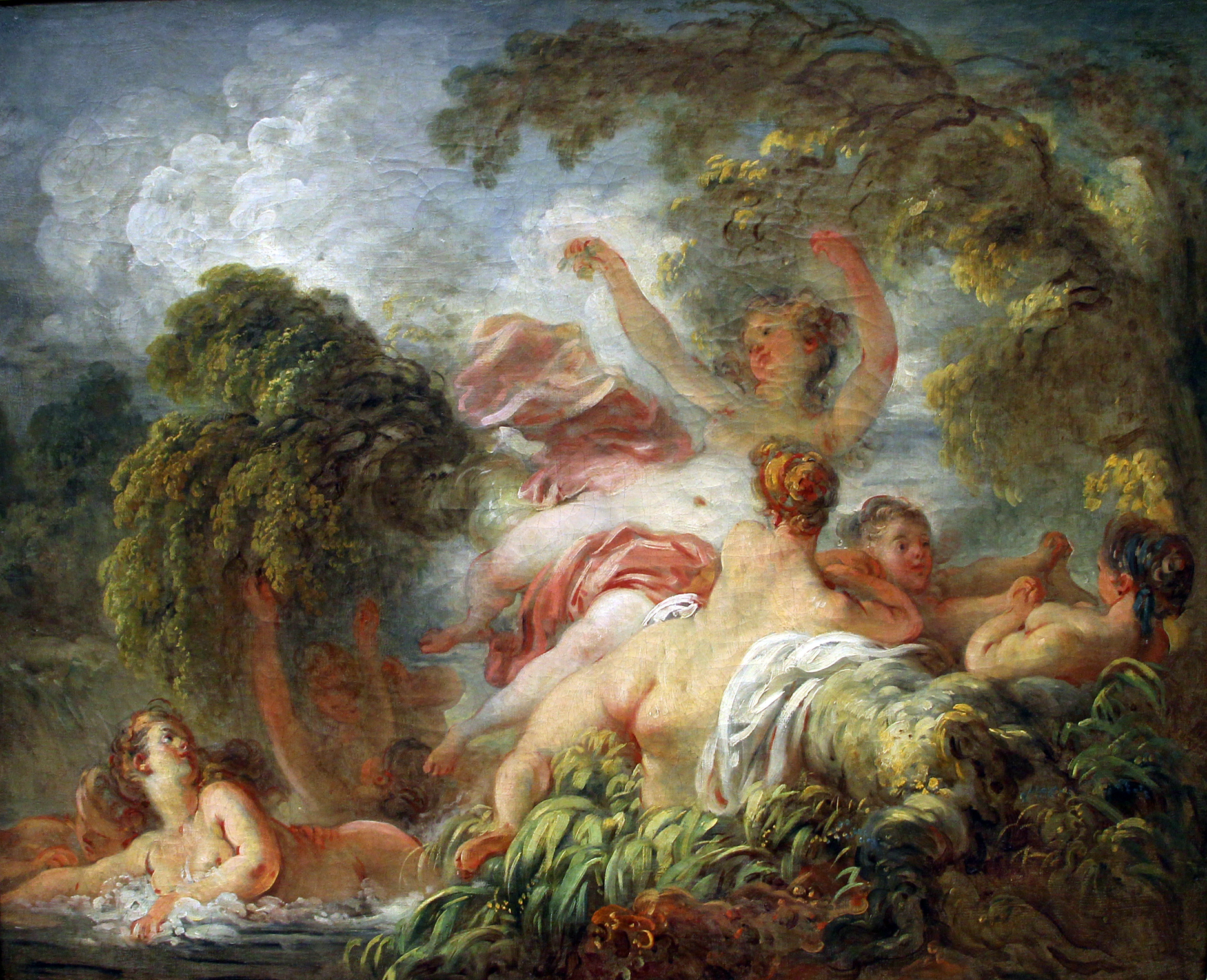
The Bathers, c. 1765, Louvre, Paris

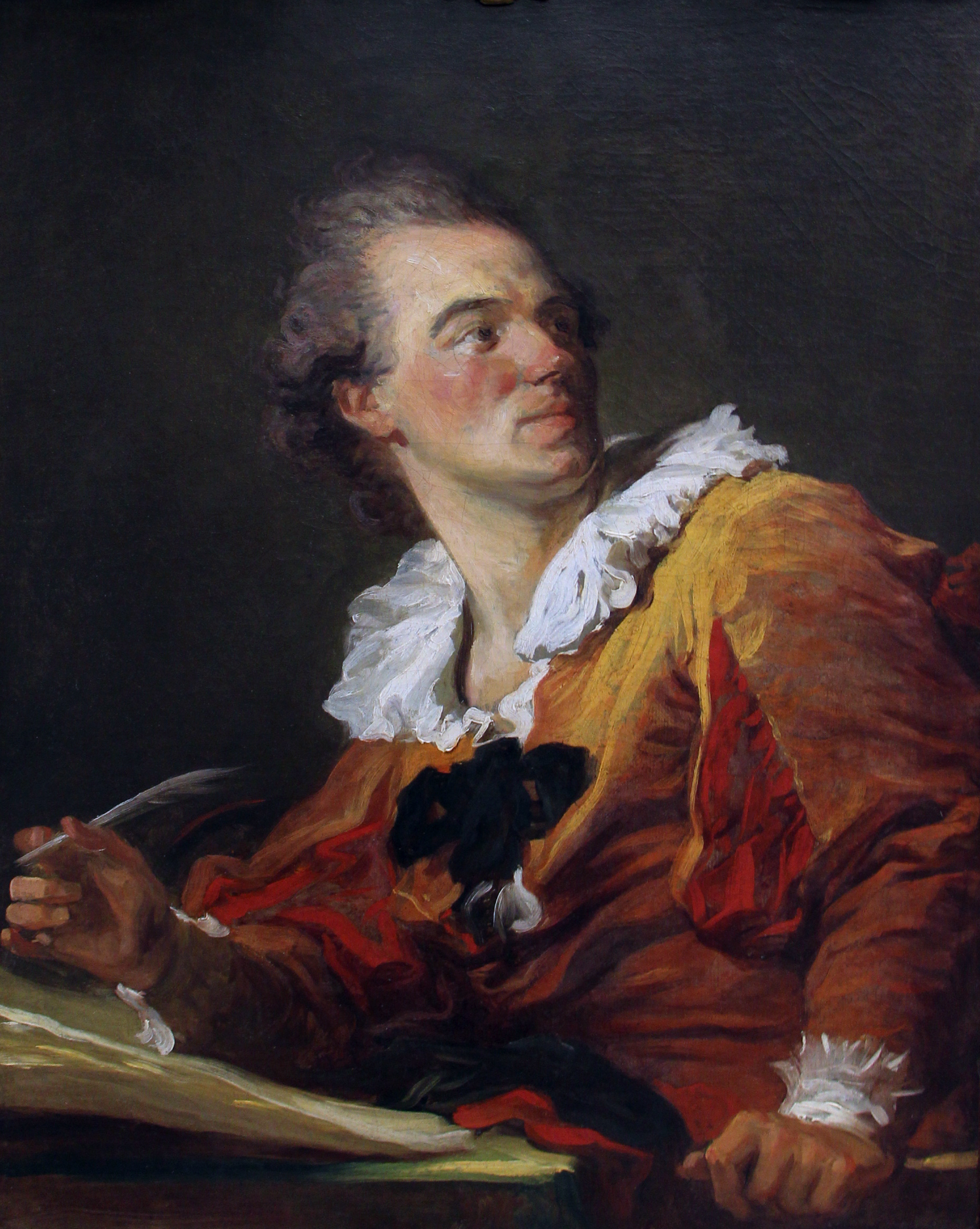
Inspiration, 1769, Louvre, Paris

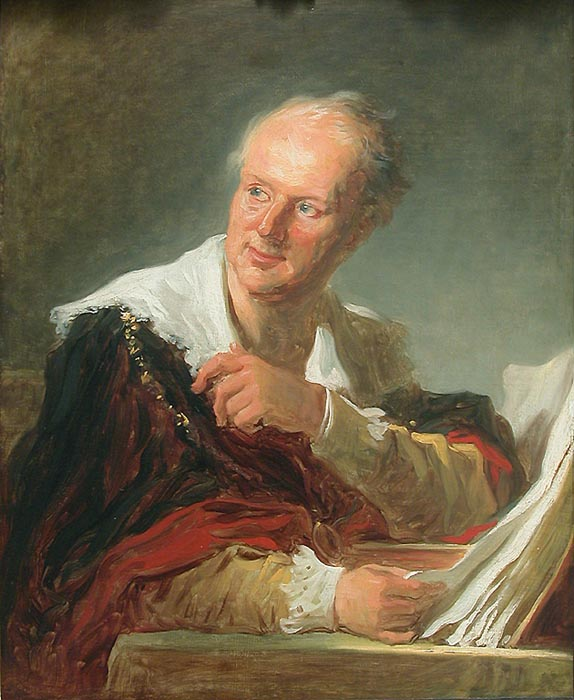
Portrait of a Man, the so-called Denis Diderot, 1769, Louvre, Paris

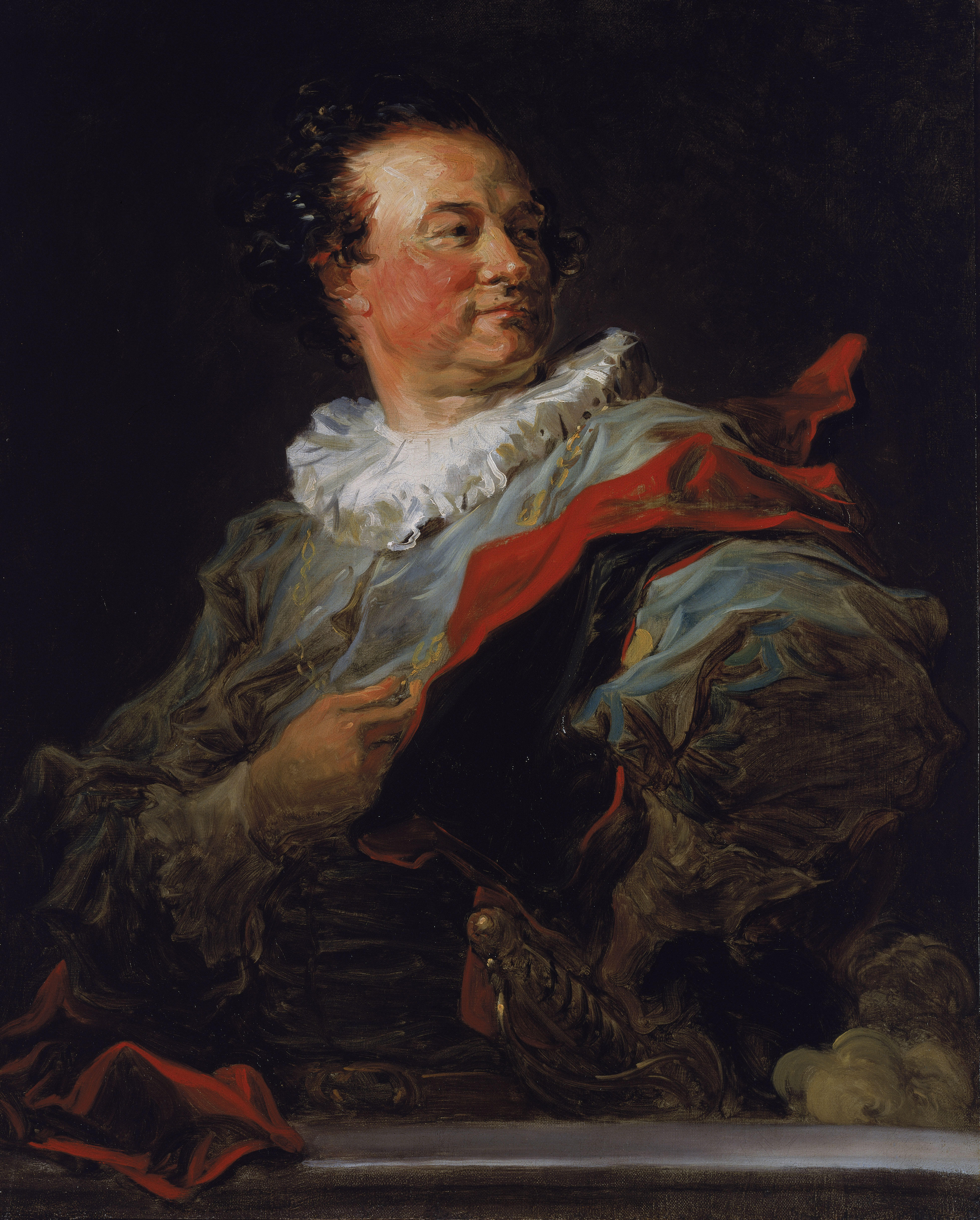
Portrait of François-Henri d'Harcourt, c. 1769, Accademia Carrara di Belle Arti di Bergamo, Bergamo

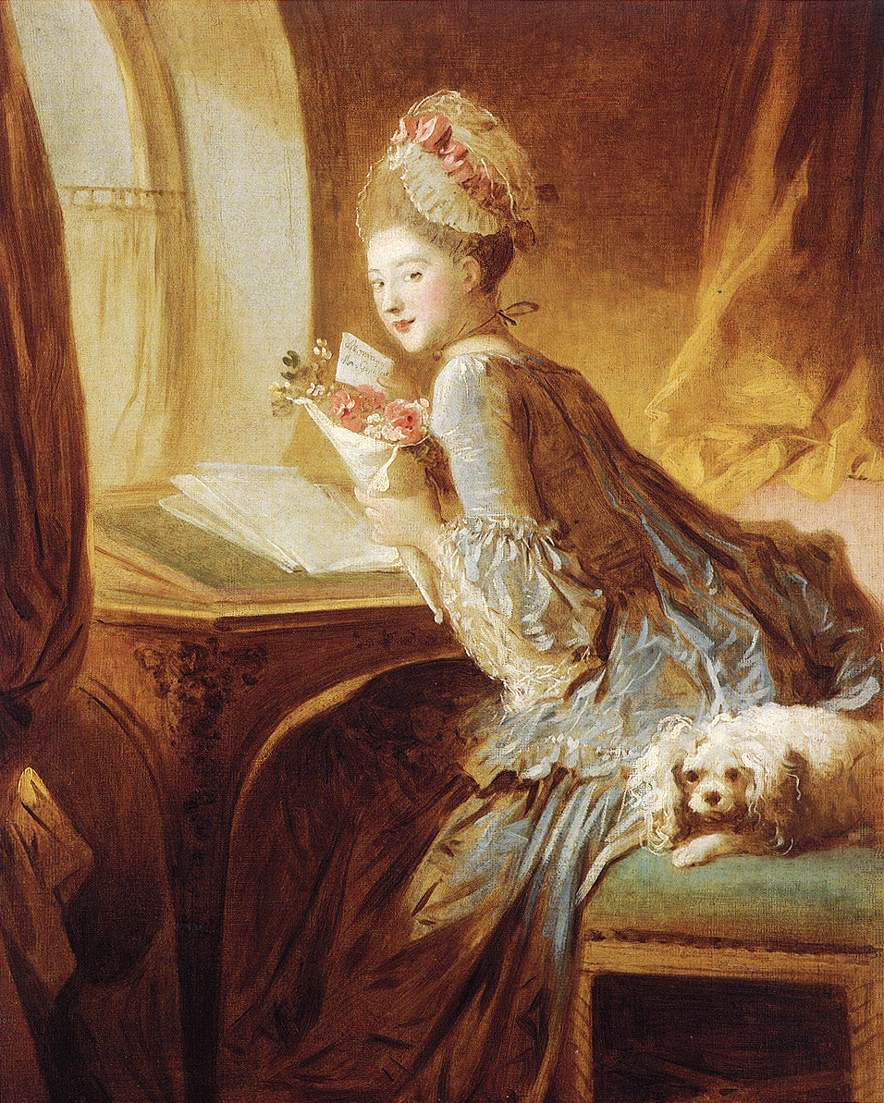
The Love Letter, 1770, Metropolitan Museum of Art, New York

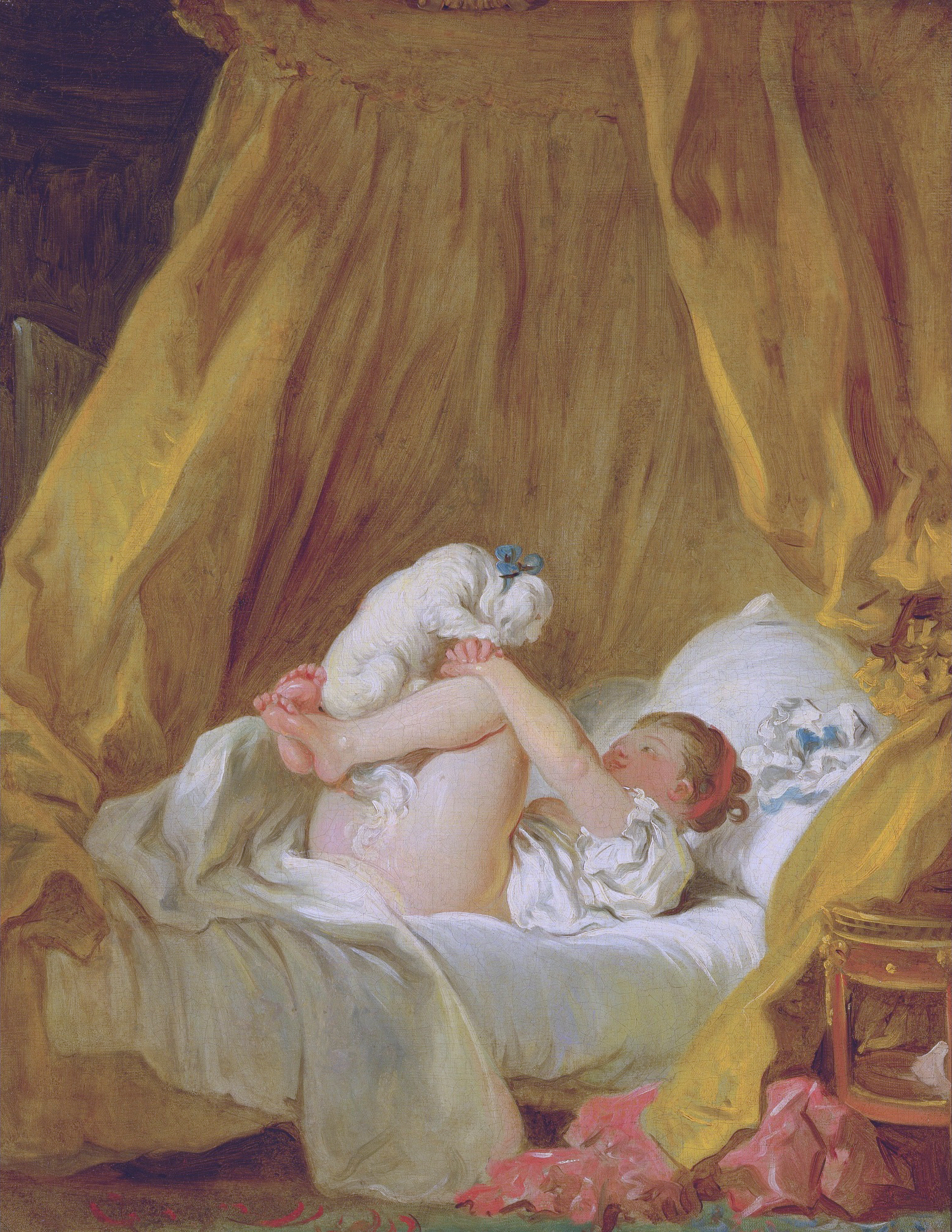
La Gimblette, c. 1770, Alte Pinakothek, Munich

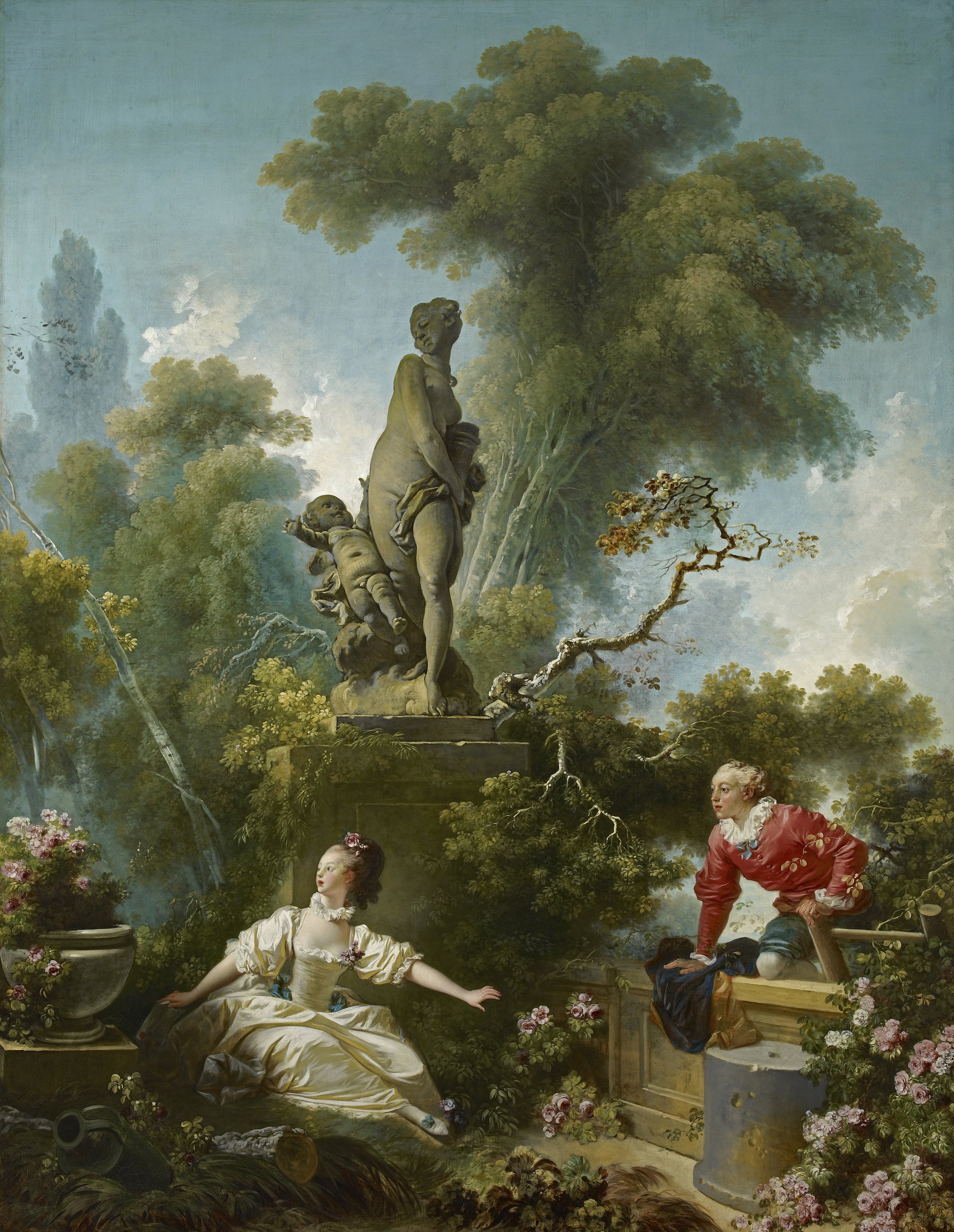
The Secret Meeting, 1771, (former collection of Madame Du Barry), Frick Collection, New York

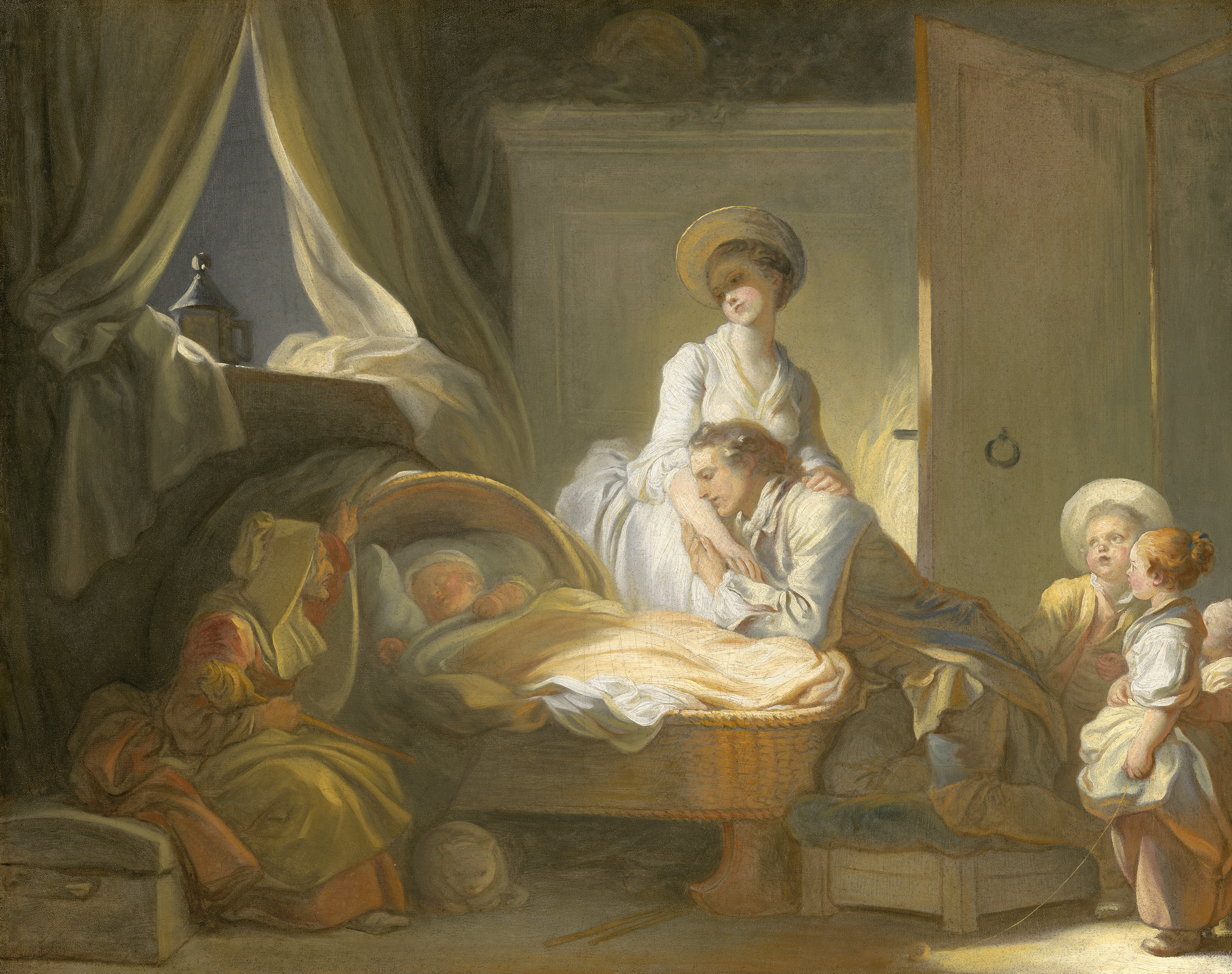
The Visit to the Nursery, c. 1775, National Gallery of Art, Washington, D.C.

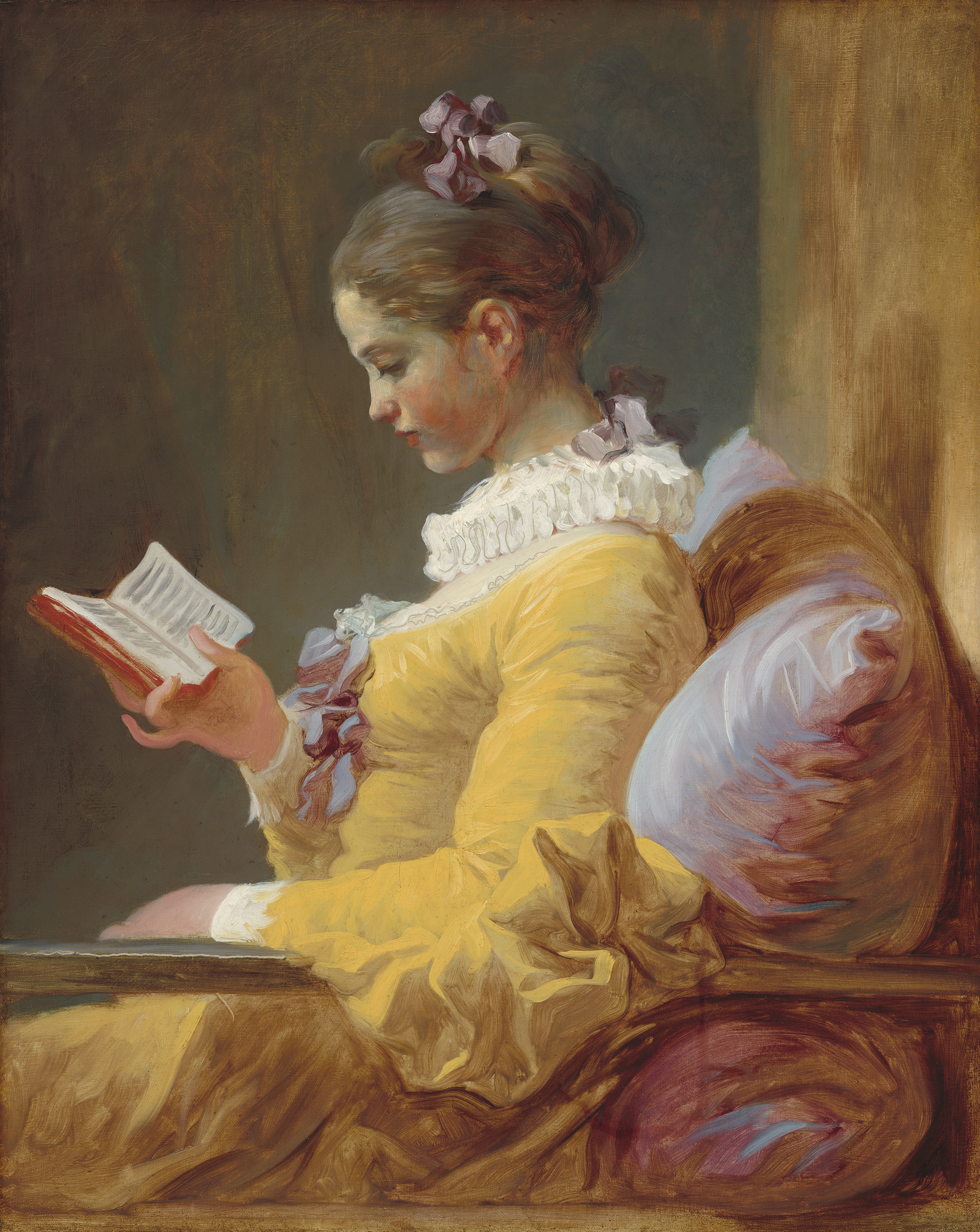
A Young Girl Reading, c. 1776, National Gallery of Art, Washington, D.C.

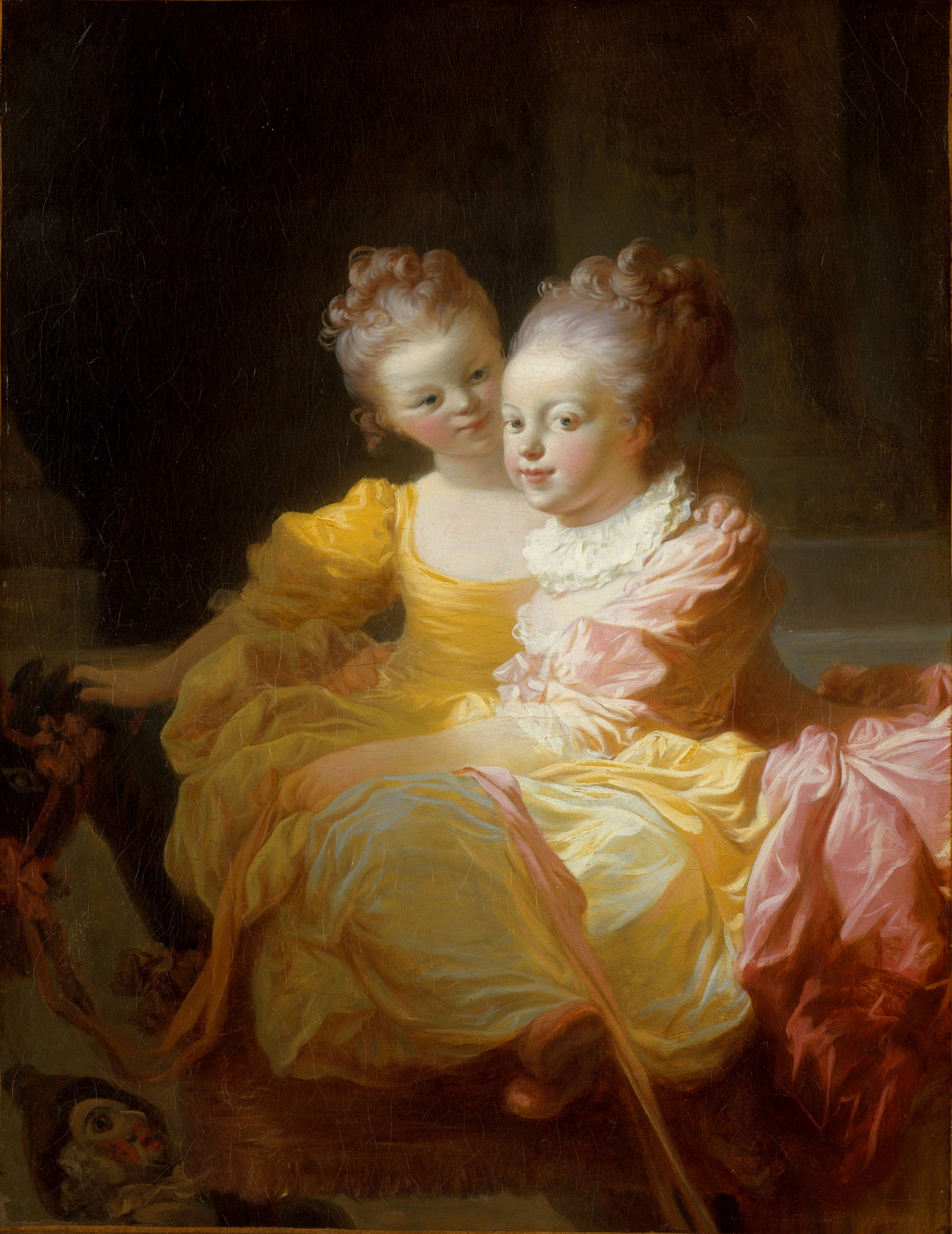
The Two Sisters, after 1778, Metropolitan Museum of Art. New York

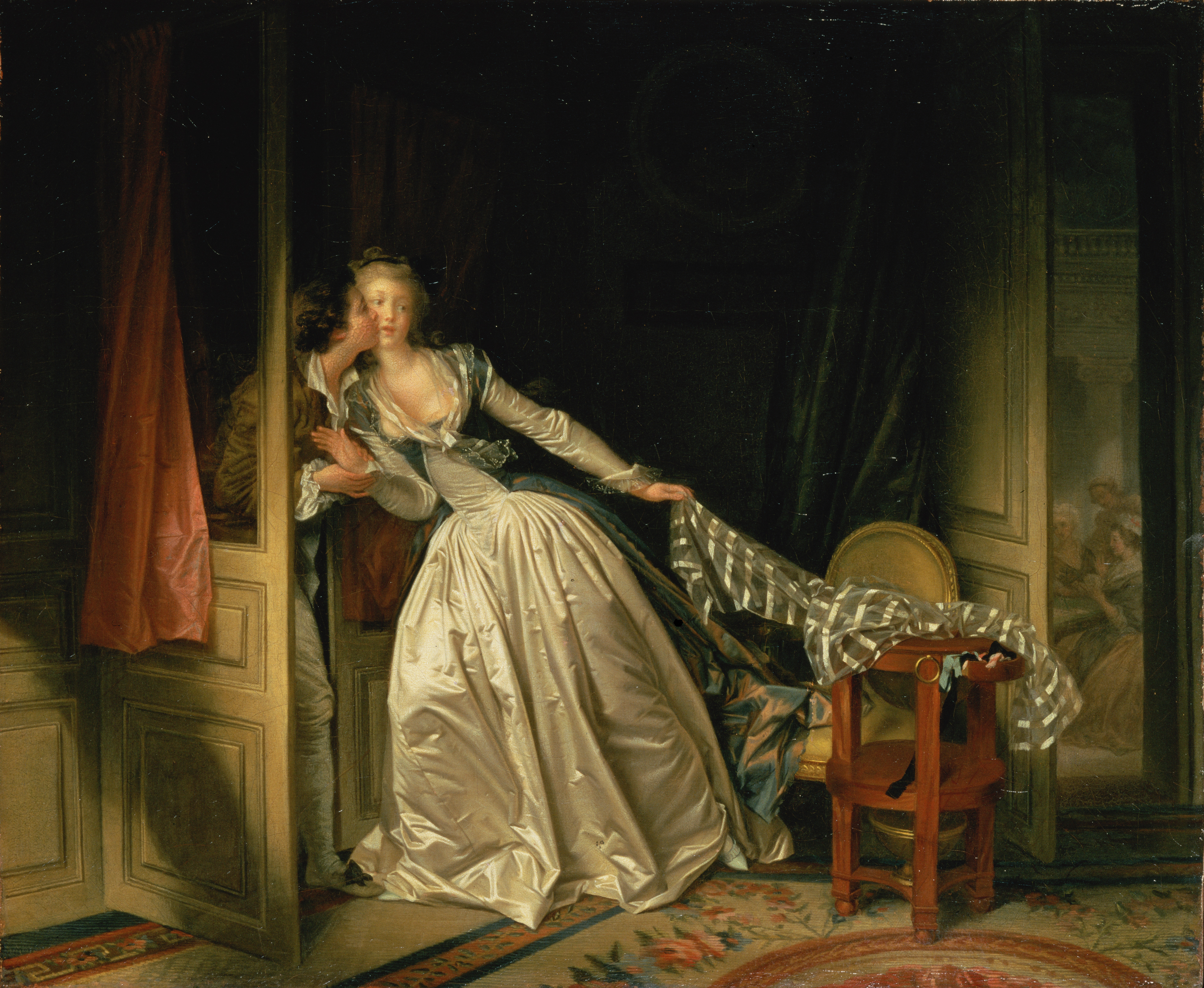
The Stolen Kiss, late 1780s, Hermitage Museum, Saint Petersburg

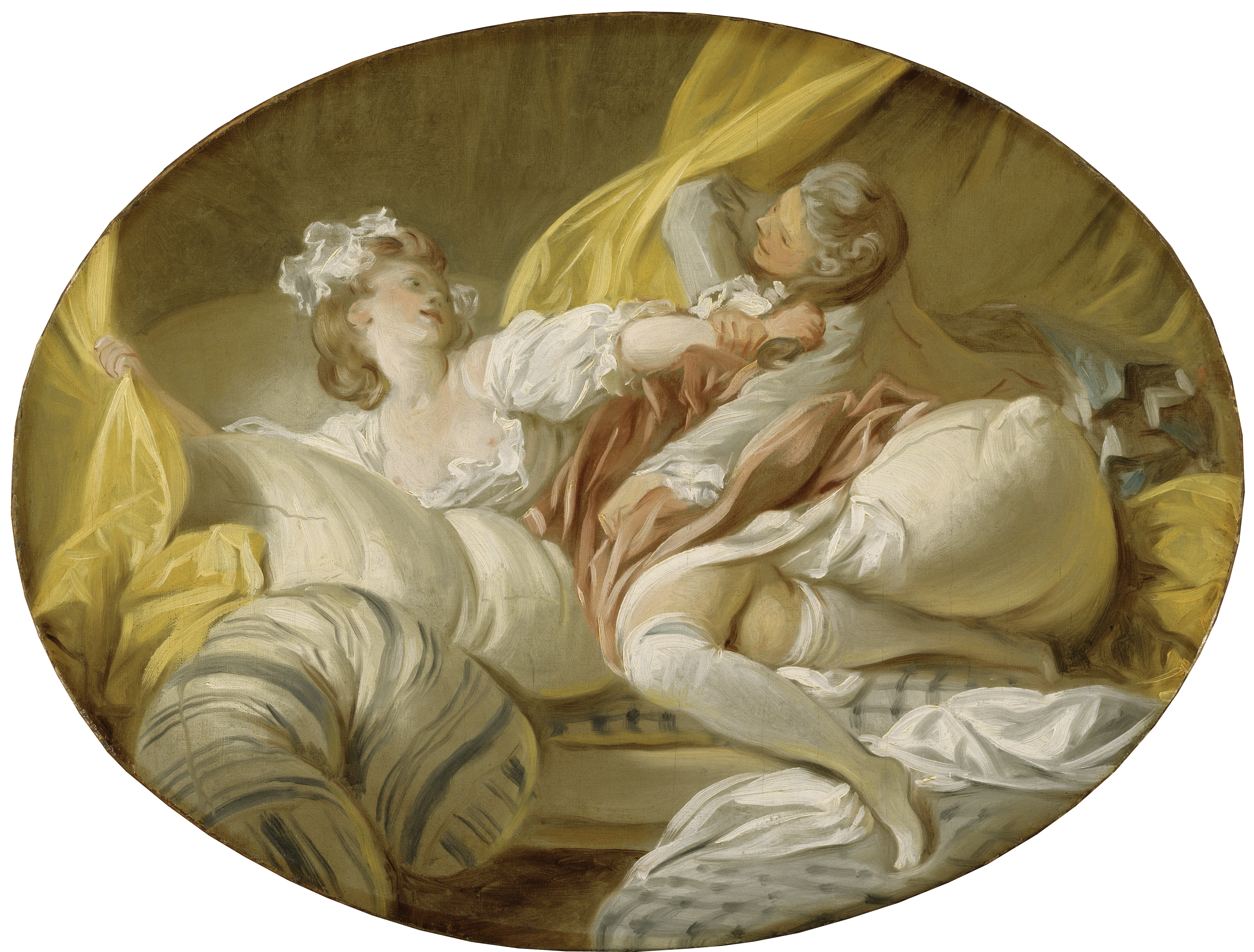
The Beautiful Servant, Nationalmuseum, Stockholm

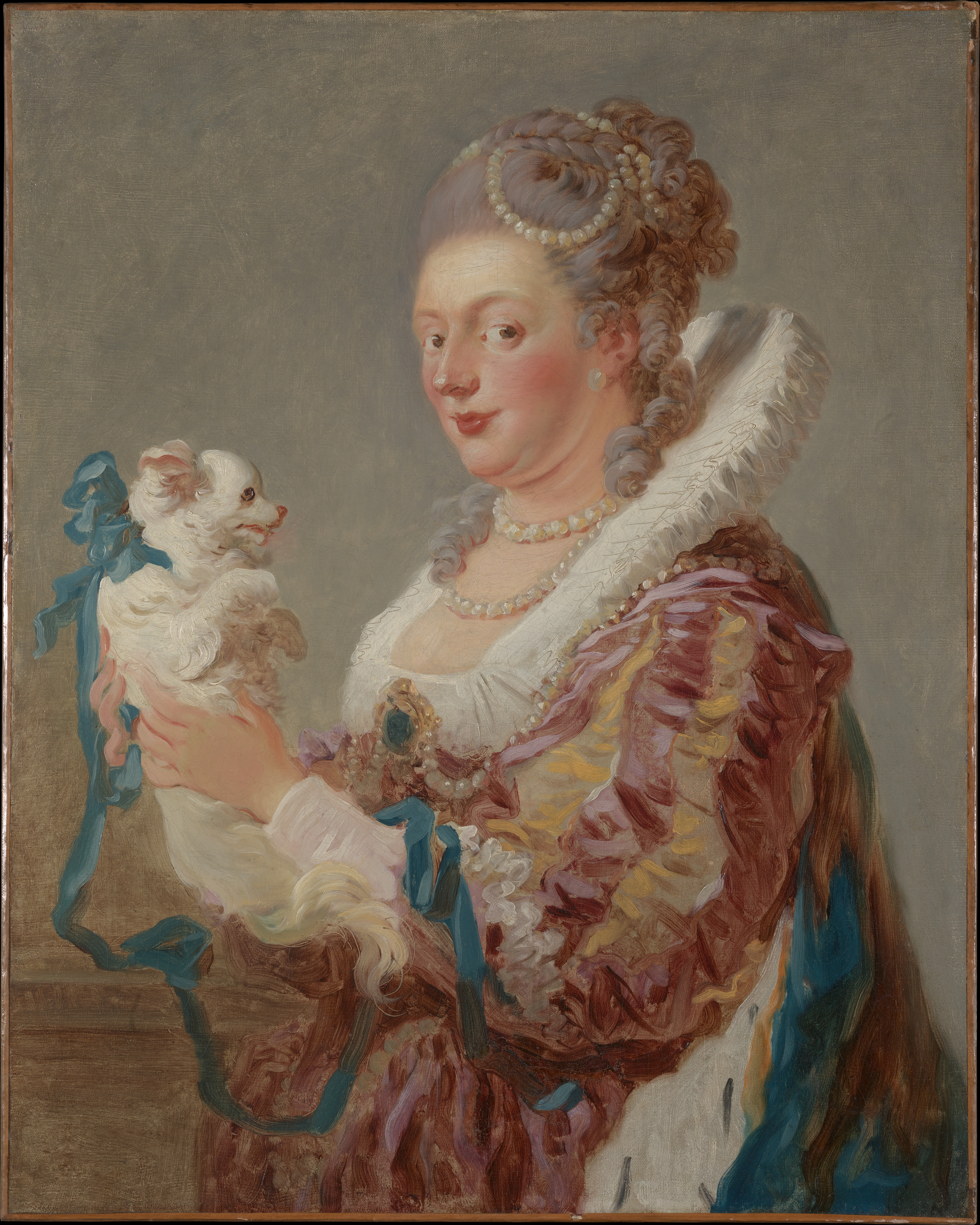
The Woman With A Dog, after 1760, found in The Metropolitan Museum of Art

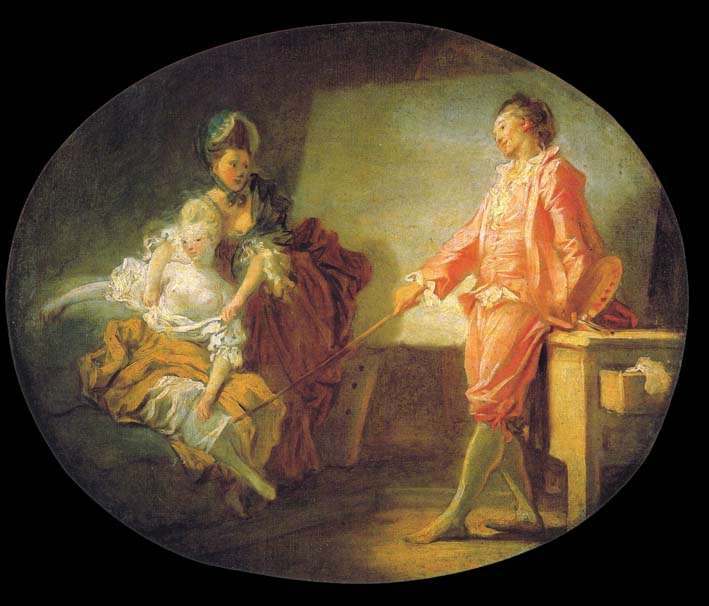
Les Débuts du Modèle Or Model's First Lesson, 1770, found in Musée Jacquemart-André

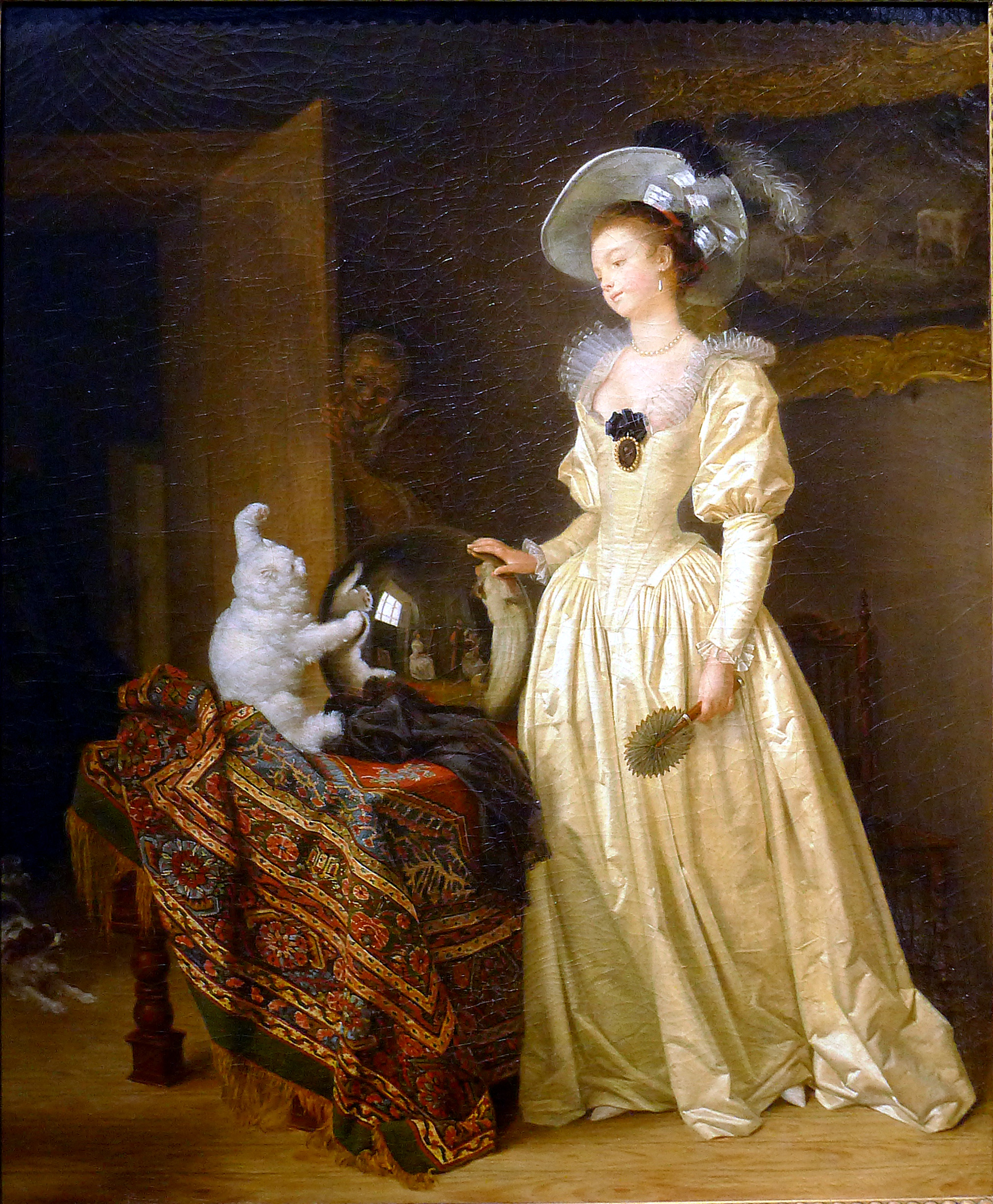
Le Chat angora (c. 1783–1785), Wallraf-Richartz Museum.

== Recent exhibitions ==
- Consuming Passion : Fragonard's Allegories of Love – Sterling and Francine Clark Art Institute, Williamstown, MA, from 28 October 2007 to 21 January 2008.
- Fragonard – Jacquemart-André Museum, Paris, from 3 October 2007 to 13 January 2008.
- Fragonard. Origines et influences. De Rembrandt au XXIe siècle – Caixa Forum, Barcelona, from 10 November 2006 to 11 February 2007.
- Les Fragonard de Besançon, Musée des Beaux-Arts et d'archéologie de Besançon, from 8 December 2006 to 2 April 2007: Official website
- Fragonard: Drawing Triumphant–Works from New York Collections, the Metropolitan Museum of Art, 6 October 2016 to 8 January 2017
- Fragonard and the French Tradition, Morgan Library & Museum, from 13 October 2006, through 7 January 2007
- Jean-Honoré Fragonard, dessins du Louvre, Musée du Louvre, Paris, from 3 December 2003 to 8 March 2004.
- Fragonard amoureux, Musée du Luxembourg, Paris, from 16 September 2015 to 24 January 2016: Official website
- Fragonard’s Enterprise: The Artist and the Literature of Travel – Norton Simon Museum, Pasadena, from 17 September 2015 to 4 January 2016.
- Fragonard: The Fantasy Figures National Gallery of Art, Washington, D.C. from 8 October - 3 December 2017

== See also ==
- Honoré Fragonard
- History of painting
- Western painting
- Jeroboam Sacrificing to Idols

== References and sources ==
=== Sources ===
Books

- Edmond and Jules de Goncourt (1881–1882). "Fragonard". L'Art du XVIIIe siècle. Vol. III. G. Charpentier. p. 241. ISBN 978-2-35548-008-9. Archived from the original on 19 November 2008.
- Eva-Gesine Baur (2007). Rococo. Taschen. ISBN 978-3-8228-5306-1.
- Jean Montague Massengale (1993). Jean-Honore Fragonard. Harry N. Abrams, Inc. ISBN 978-0-8109-3313-2.

Articles and webpages

- Lajer-Burcharth, Ewa (2003). "Fragonard in Detail". Differences: A Journal of Feminist Cultural Studies. 14 (3): 34–56. doi:10.1215/10407391-14-3-34. ISSN 1040-7391. S2CID 144003749.
- Simon, Jonathan (2002). "The Theater of Anatomy: The Anatomical Preparations of Honore Fragonard". Eighteenth-Century Studies. 36 (1): 63–79. doi:10.1353/ecs.2002.0066. ISSN 0013-2586. S2CID 162293464.
- Sheriff, Mary D. (1987). "Invention, Resemblance, and Fragonard's Portraits de Fantaisie". Art Bulletin. 69 (1): 77–87. doi:10.1080/00043079.1987.10788403. ISSN 0004-3079.
- Ferrand, Franck (2008). "Monsieur Fragonard". France Today. Vol. 23, no. 2. pp. 30–31. ISSN 0895-3651.
- McEwen, J. (1988). "Fragonard: Rococo or romantic?". Art in America. Vol. 76, no. 2. p. 84. ISSN 0004-3214.
- Milam, Jennifer (1998). "Fragonard and the blindman's game: Interpreting representations of Blindman's Buff". Art History. 21 (1): 1–25. doi:10.1111/1467-8365.00090. ISSN 0141-6790.
- Milam, Jennifer (2000). "Playful Constructions and Fragonard's Swinging Scenes". Eighteenth-Century Studies. 33 (4): 543–559. doi:10.1353/ecs.2000.0042. ISSN 0013-2586. S2CID 162283094.
- "Cy Twombly, Untitled". The Guggenheim Museums and Foundation. 10 February 2025.
- "'The Swing (after Fragonard)', Yinka Shonibare CBE, 2001". Tate. 12 January 2022.
