= Jeroboam Sacrificing to Idols =

1752 painting by Jean-Honoré Fragonard

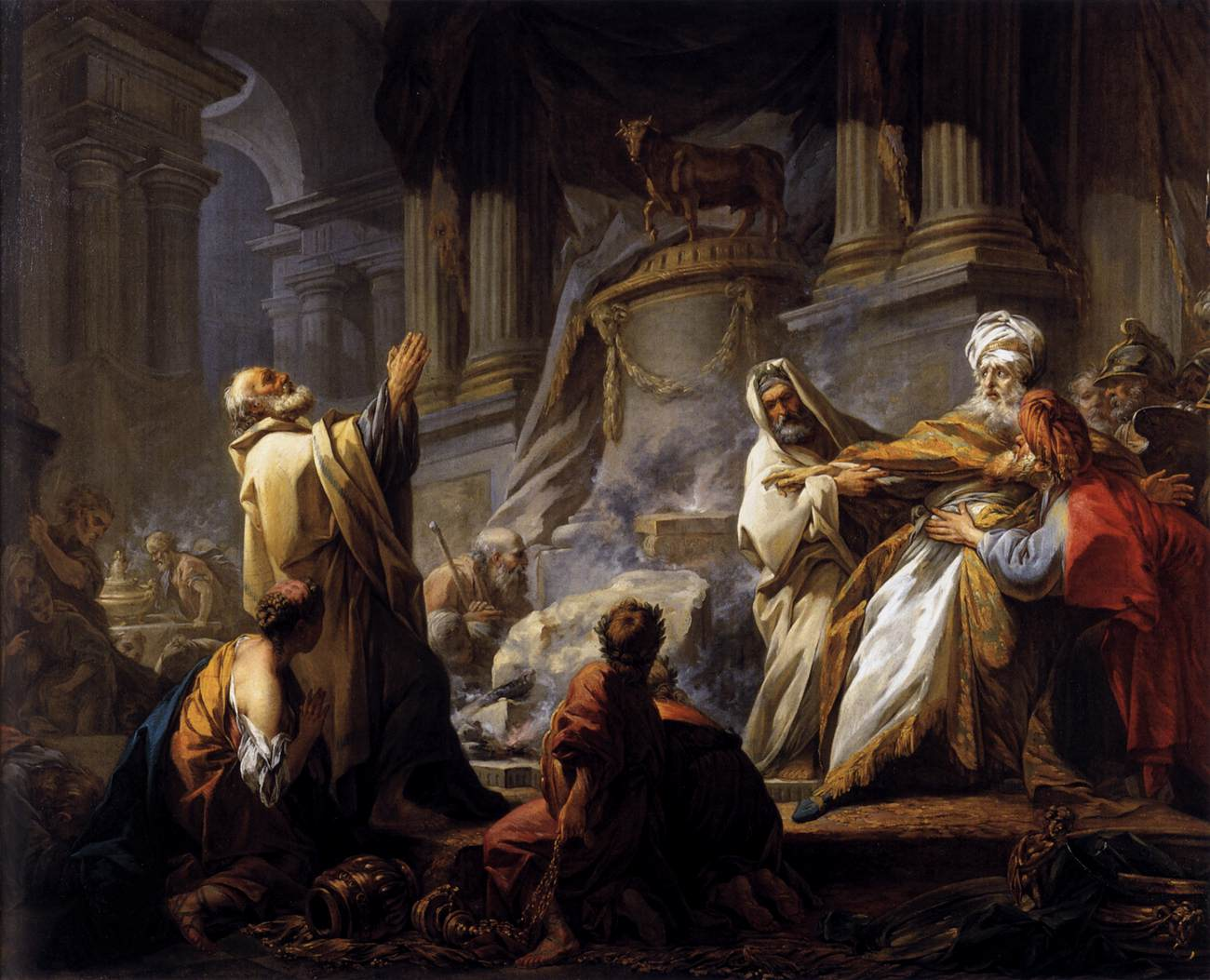
Jeroboam Sacrificing to Idols, 1752, 111.5 by 143.5 centimetres (43.9 in × 56.5 in) Académie des Beaux-Arts

Jeroboam Sacrificing to Idols (French: Jéroboam sacrifiant aux idoles) is a history painting by the French painter Jean-Honoré Fragonard, in oil on canvas. It won him the highly prestigious Prix de Rome for painting on 26 August 1752, shortly after he turned 20 years old; this "precocious triumph" was even more remarkable as he had not received the usual training at the Académie royale de peinture et de sculpture. The painted surface measures 111.5 by 143.5 centimetres (43.9 in × 56.5 in). It was retained by the Académie until that institution was abolished in the French Revolution and is now part of the collection of the successor Académie des Beaux-Arts.

== Subject ==
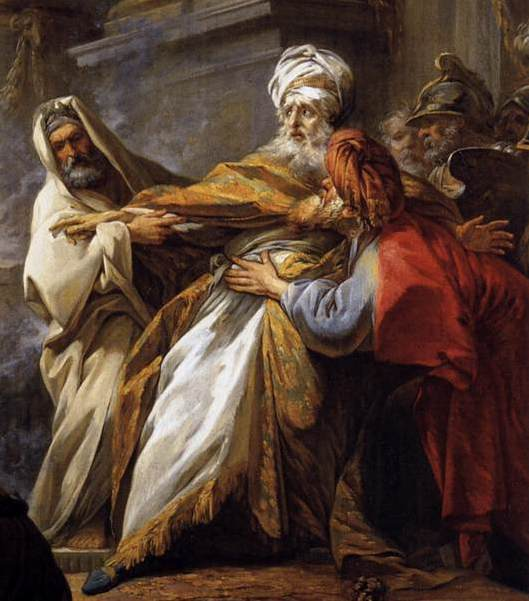
Detail of Jeroboam Sacrificing to Idols, with King Jeroboam

The subject had been chosen by the judges of the competition, and was the unusual but dramatic Old Testament subject of King Jeroboam in 1 Kings 12:26–30 and 13:1–5. This lay well outside the range of light-hearted Rococo scenes of pastoral romance, flirtation and erotic mythology that Fragonard was already developing at the studio of François Boucher. The moment depicted is when Jeroboam, at right in the white turban, is about to sacrifice to pagan idols, when an unnamed prophet (standing, at left) intercedes:

When King Jeroboam heard what the man of God cried out against the altar at Bethel, he stretched out his hand from the altar and said, "Seize him!" But the hand he stretched out toward the man shrivelled up, so that he could not pull it back. Also, the altar was split apart and its ashes poured out according to the sign given by the man of God by the word of the Lord.

King Solomon Sacrificing to Idols, under the influence of his foreign wives, was a slightly more popular subject, forming part of the Power of Women group.

== Style ==
Fragonard has adjusted his usual softer style to the requirements of history painting, less close to that of his master Boucher than those of Carle van Loo, with whom Fragonard was now to train, and Jean François de Troy, director of the French Academy in Rome, who had just died there in January 1752.

Images using infrared photography show numerous pentimenti, especially in the area of the split altar in the centre of the painting, with "its ashes poured out", an unusual challenge for the painter to visualize, over which Fragonard evidently took much trouble.

== Exhibitions ==
Despite having had a single owner since it was painted, the painting is now very well-travelled, having been included in exhibitions in Rome (1904), Moscow and Leningrad (1978), Kyoto (1980), Malibu (1982–83), Bayonne (1987), New York (1988), Tokyo (1989), Warsaw, Budapest and Bucharest (2004–05), Barcelona and Madrid (2006–07), Oklahoma City, Albuquerque, New Mexico and Naples, Florida (2014–15), as well as many in Paris.

The subject by other artists

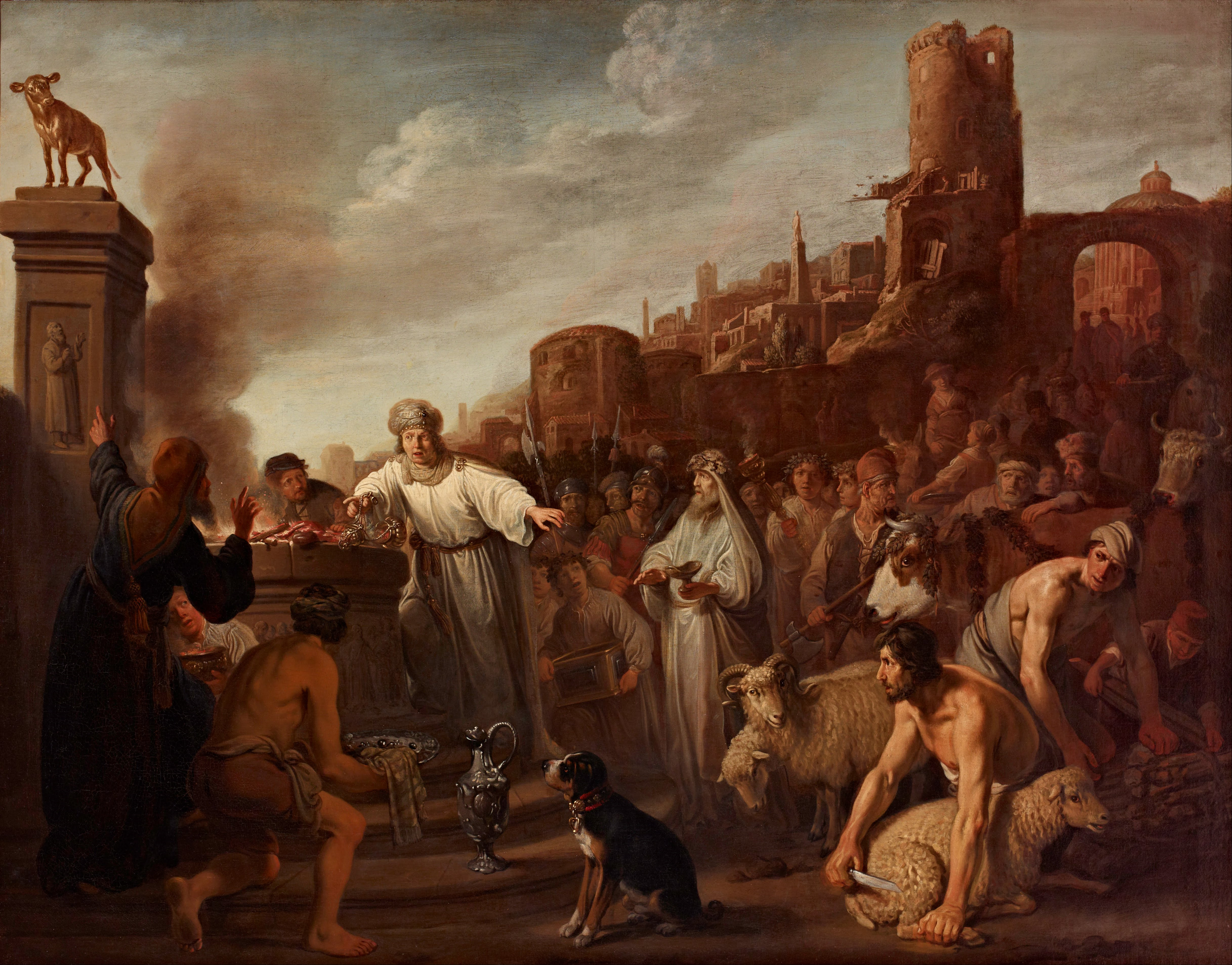
Claes Moeyaert, 1641

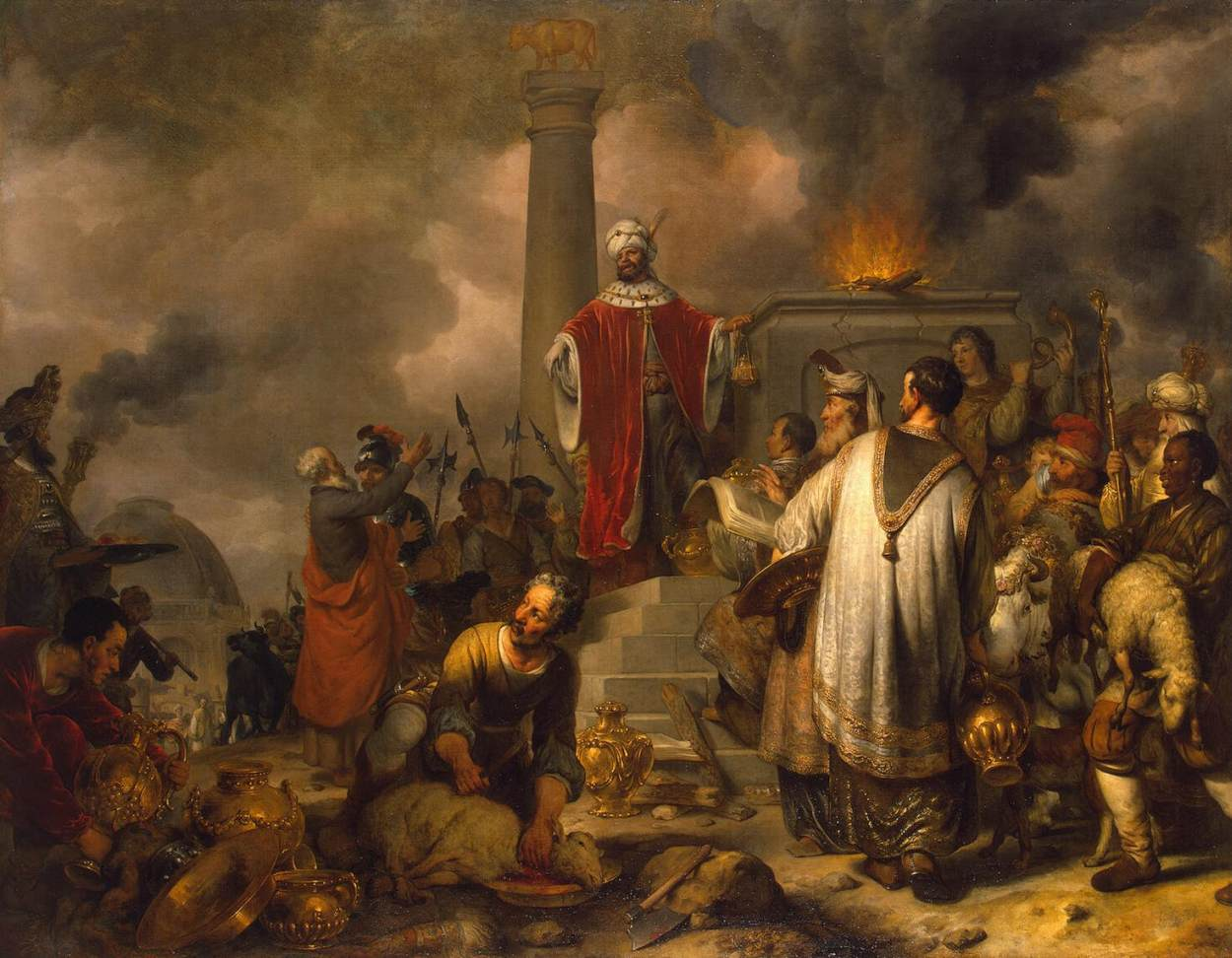
Gerbrand van den Eeckhout, 1656, Hermitage Museum

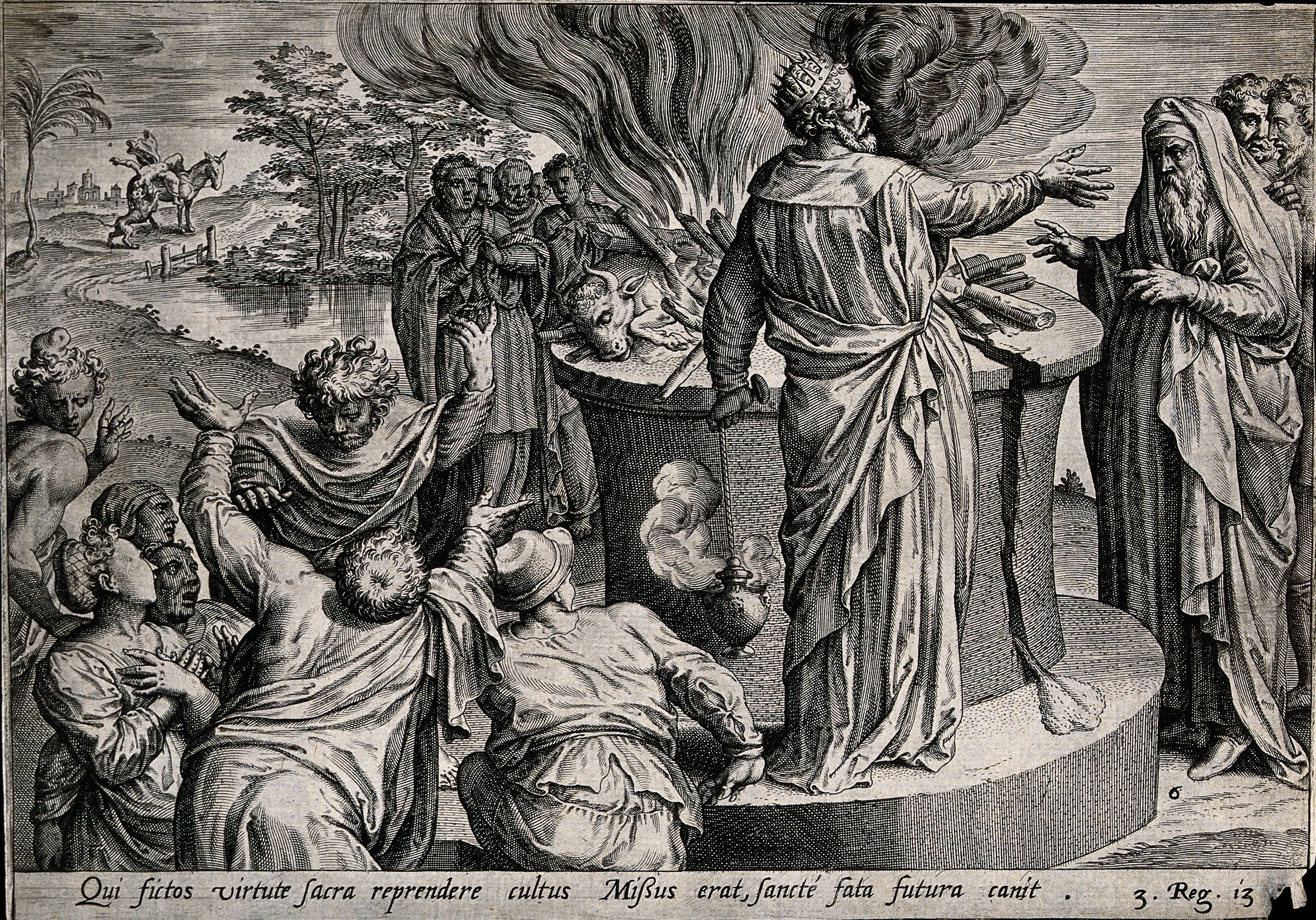
17th-century print, perhaps by one of the Galle family

== See also ==
- List of works by Fragonard
