= Blindekuh =

Blindekuh (German: Blind man's buff) may refer to:

- Blindekuh (operetta), an 1878 operetta by Johann Strauss II
- Blindekuh (film), a 1915 film by Ernst Lubitsch
- Blindekuh (restaurant), two restaurants in Switzerland

== See also ==
- Blind man's bluff (disambiguation)
