= Blind man's bluff =

Blind man's bluff or Blind Man's Buff may refer to:

- Blind man's buff, a children's game related to tag

== Film and television ==
- Blind Man's Bluff (1936 film), a British film
- Blind Man's Bluff (1952 film), a 1952 British film directed by Charles Saunders
- "Blind Man's Bluff", an episode of the TV series All Grown Up!
- "Blind Man's Bluff", a season 5 episode of the TV series Little House on the Prairie
- "Blind Man's Bluff", two episodes of the TV series Gunsmoke, in season 8 (1963) and season 17 (1972)

== Paintings ==
- Blind Man's Bluff (Fragonard, 1750)
- Blind Man's Buff (Fragonard, 1775–1780)
- Blind Man's Bluff (Goya), 1789
- Blind-Man's Buff (Wilkie), 1812

== Other uses ==
- Blind man's bluff (poker), a version of poker
- Blind Man's Bluff: The Untold Story of American Submarine Espionage, a 1998 nonfiction book
- Hasche-Mann (Blind Man's Buff), an 1838 piano piece from Kinderszenen, by Robert Schumann
