= The New Model =

Painting by Jean-Honoré Fragonard

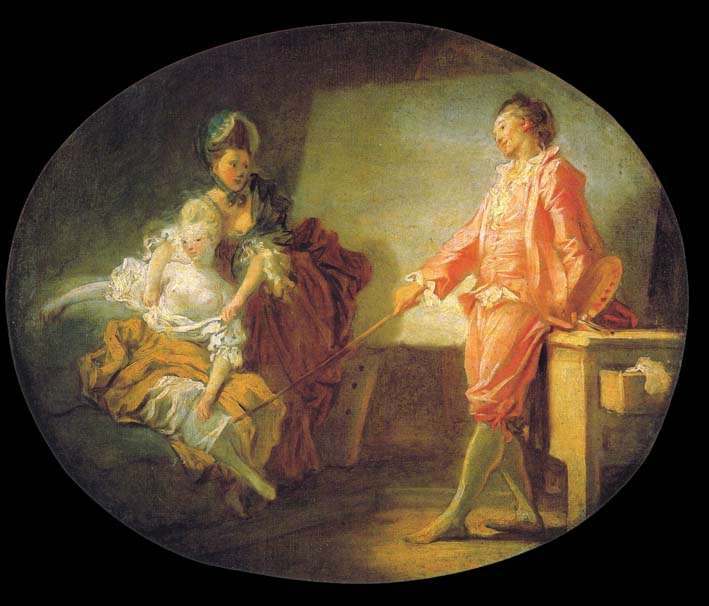
The New Model (c. 1770) by Jean-Honoré Fragonard

The New Model (French: Les Débuts du modèle) (The Model's Début or The Model's First Session) is a c. 1770 oil-on-canvas painting by Jean-Honoré Fragonard, acquired by Édouard André before his marriage and now in the Musée Jacquemart-André.

The middle-aged man standing on the right side is the painter holding a stick, the paint brush. The woman is the topic of his painting, she is what he wants to paint. The older woman in the middle offers the younger woman to him. Her bare chest is a sign of her willingness to cooperate in this incestuous scenario. This painting can be compared to Fragonard's The Swing where an older man orchestrates the encounter of two young lovers.

== See also ==
- List of works by Fragonard
