= Affair =

Secret or unapproved attachment outside a relationship

An affair is a relationship typically between two people, one or both of whom are either married or in a long-term monogamous or emotionally-exclusive relationship with another person. The affair can be solely sexual, solely physical, solely emotional, or a combination of these.

The relationship is commonly concealed and is generally understood to violate the exclusivity expectations of the primary partnership. The partner outside the primary relationship in an affair is sometimes called a "paramour". Affairs are often emotionally lopsided in that paramour will be the only one to heavily invest themselves into the affair.

A fling usually refers to a brief or casual romantic or sexual involvement, whereas an affair is more often ongoing.

== Romantic affair ==
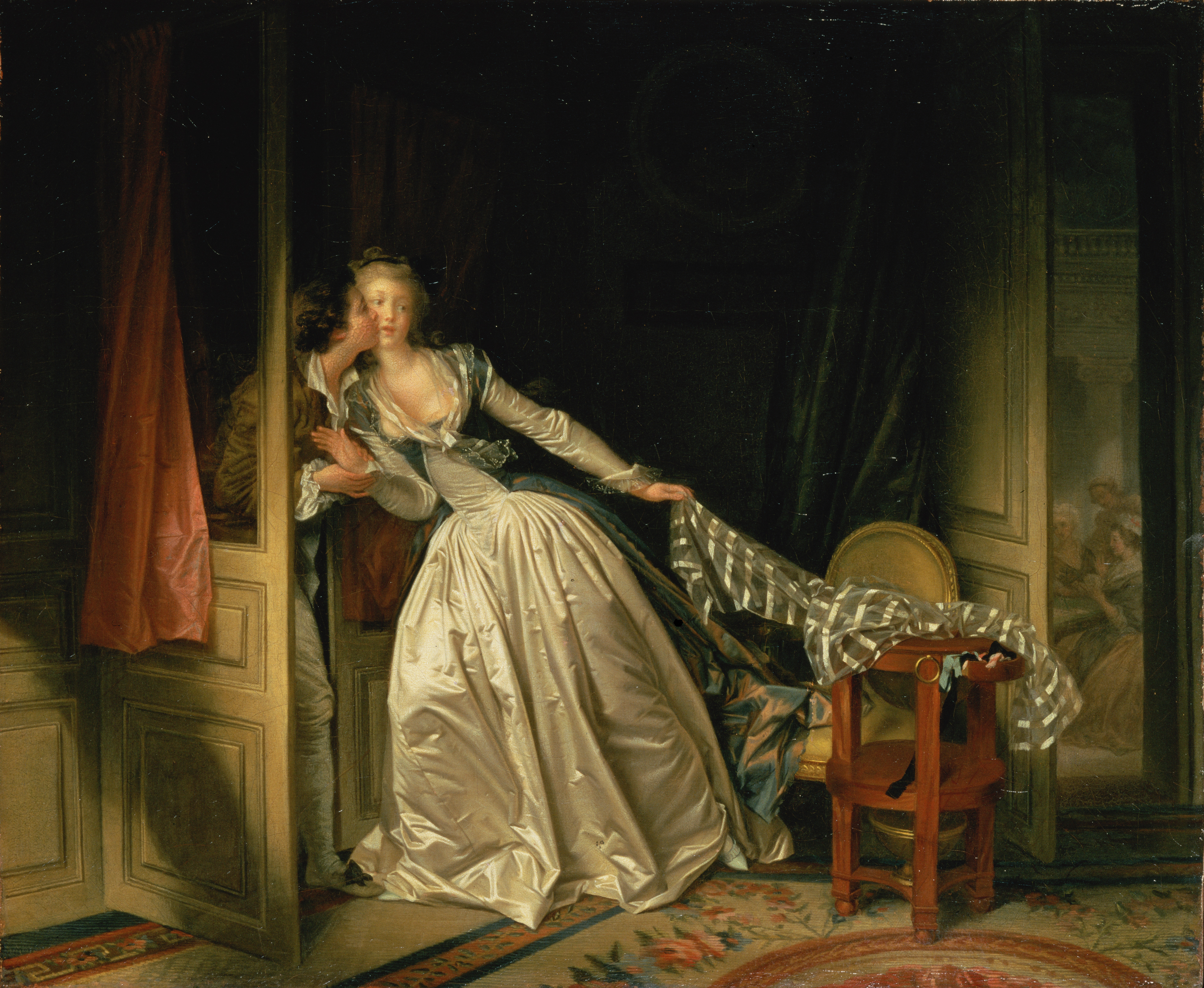
The Stolen Kiss by Jean-Honoré Fragonard

A romantic affair, also called an affair of the heart, is an emotional or sexual relationship between two people without expectations of a formal partnership.

The term affair may also describe part of an agreement within an open marriage or open relationship, such as swinging, dating, or polyamory, in which some forms of sex with one's non-primary partner(s) are permitted and other forms are not. Participants in open relationships, including unmarried couples and polyamorous families, may consider sanctioned affairs the norm, but when a non-sanctioned affair occurs, it is described as infidelity and may be experienced as adultery, or a betrayal both of trust and integrity, even though to most people it would not be considered illicit.

When romantic affairs lack both overt and covert sexual behavior, yet exhibit intense or enduring emotional intimacy, it may also be referred to as an emotional affair, platonic love, or a romantic friendship.

== Extramarital affair ==
Extramarital affairs are relationships outside of marriage where an illicit romantic or sexual relationship or a romantic friendship or passionate attachment occurs.

An affair can continue in one form or another for years, even as one of the partners in that affair passes through marriage, divorce, and remarriage. This could be considered the primary relationship, with the marriage secondary to it. Many people claim the reason for an extramarital affair is their unsuccessful marriage where both spouses fail to please each other. Dissatisfaction, low self-esteem, desire for adventure, and impulse are also major motivating factors of romantic affairs. This may be serial polygamy or other forms of nonmonogamy. Polyamoric community usually considers this type of nonmonogamy non-ethical, since there is no consent from the betrayed partner.

Individuals having affairs with married men or women can be prosecuted for adultery in some jurisdictions and can be sued by the jilted spouses in others, or named as co-respondents in divorce proceedings. As of 2009, eight U.S. states permitted such alienation of affections lawsuits. Affairs with the consent of their significant others may not be considered infidelity or adultery.

== See also ==
- Adultery
- Ashley Madison
- Courtly love
- Crime of passion
- Family therapy
- Love triangle
- On-again, off-again relationship
- Polysexuality
- Scandal
