= The See-Saw (Fragonard, Madrid) =

Painting by Jean-Honoré Fragonard

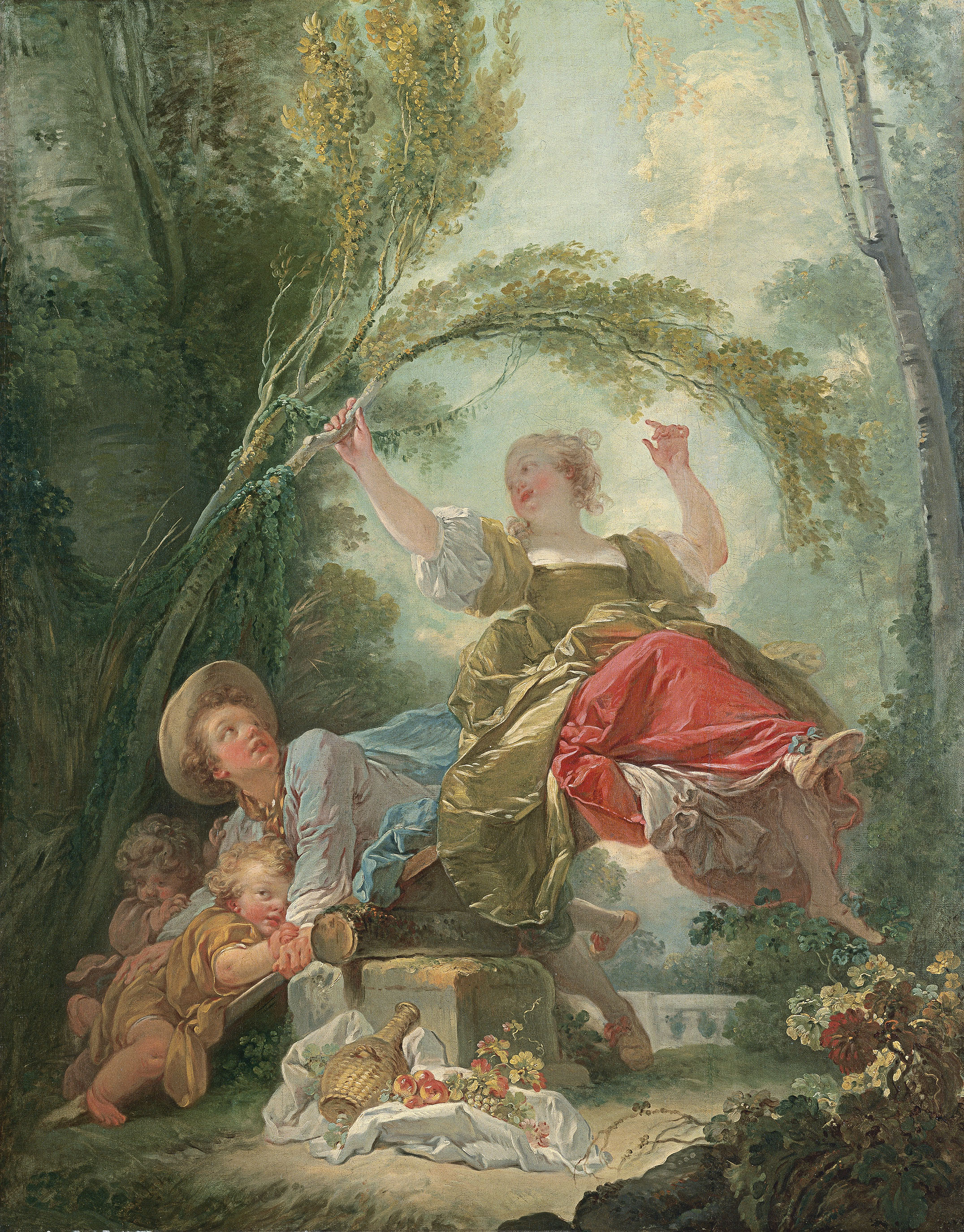
- Artist: Jean-Honoré Fragonard
- Year: c. 1750−1752
- Medium: oil on canvas
- Dimensions: 120 cm × 94.5 cm (47 in × 37.2 in)
- Location: Thyssen-Bornemisza Museum, Madrid

The See-Saw is an oil-on-canvas painting by French Rococo artist Jean-Honoré Fragonard, created c.1750–1752 during the artist's early career. It is currently in the Thyssen-Bornemisza Museum in Madrid. The painting forms a pair with another Fragonard work entitled Blind Man's Bluff. Blind Man's Bluff focuses on courtship while The See-Saw, and the metaphor of the rocking motion of the seesaw, suggests the relationship has been consummated.

The See-Saw depicts young children playing with a seesaw in a forest grove. It is seen as an important precedent to Fragonard's masterpiece The Swing.

== See also ==
- List of works by Fragonard
