= The Birth of Venus (Fragonard) =

Painting by Jean-Honoré Fragonard

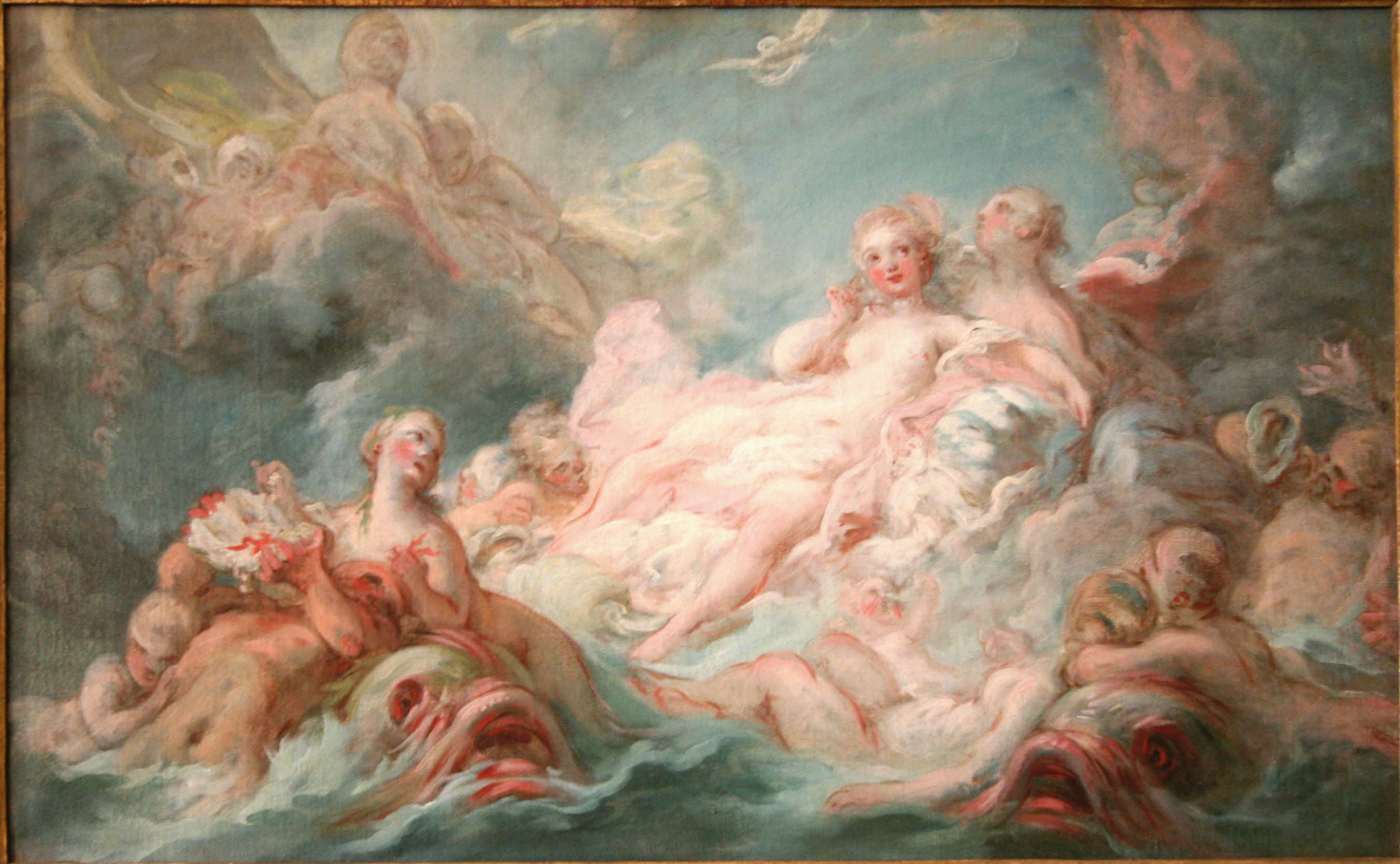
- Artist: Jean-Honoré Fragonard
- Year: c. 1753−1755
- Medium: oil on canvas
- Dimensions: 54 cm × 83 cm (21 in × 33 in)
- Location: Musée Grobet-Labadié, Marseille

The Birth of Venus (French: La Naissance de Vénus) is an oil-on-canvas painting by the French Rococo painter Jean-Honoré Fragonard, produced between 1753 and 1755. It is held by the Musée Grobet-Labadié in Marseille.

A sketch for the painting is in the Smith College Museum of Art. In the sketch, Fragonard used a mix of red chalk and other media to study the composition before transferring it onto canvas. The Birth of Venus and its sketch are an example of Fragonard's habit of reversing scene direction and changing figure positions in order to achieve an ideal composition.

Fragonard was inspired by François Boucher's The Triumph of Venus when he created this painting (Boucher was Fragonard's teacher).

== See also ==
- List of works by Fragonard
