= Fantastical Portraits =

Painting series by Jean-Honoré Fragonard

The Fantastical Portraits or Fantasy Portraits (French: Portraits de fantaisie) are a series of portraits by the French painter Jean-Honoré Fragonard, mostly dating to 1769. It is said that each was executed in a single hour, from which they gained the Italian name fa' presto (made quickly).

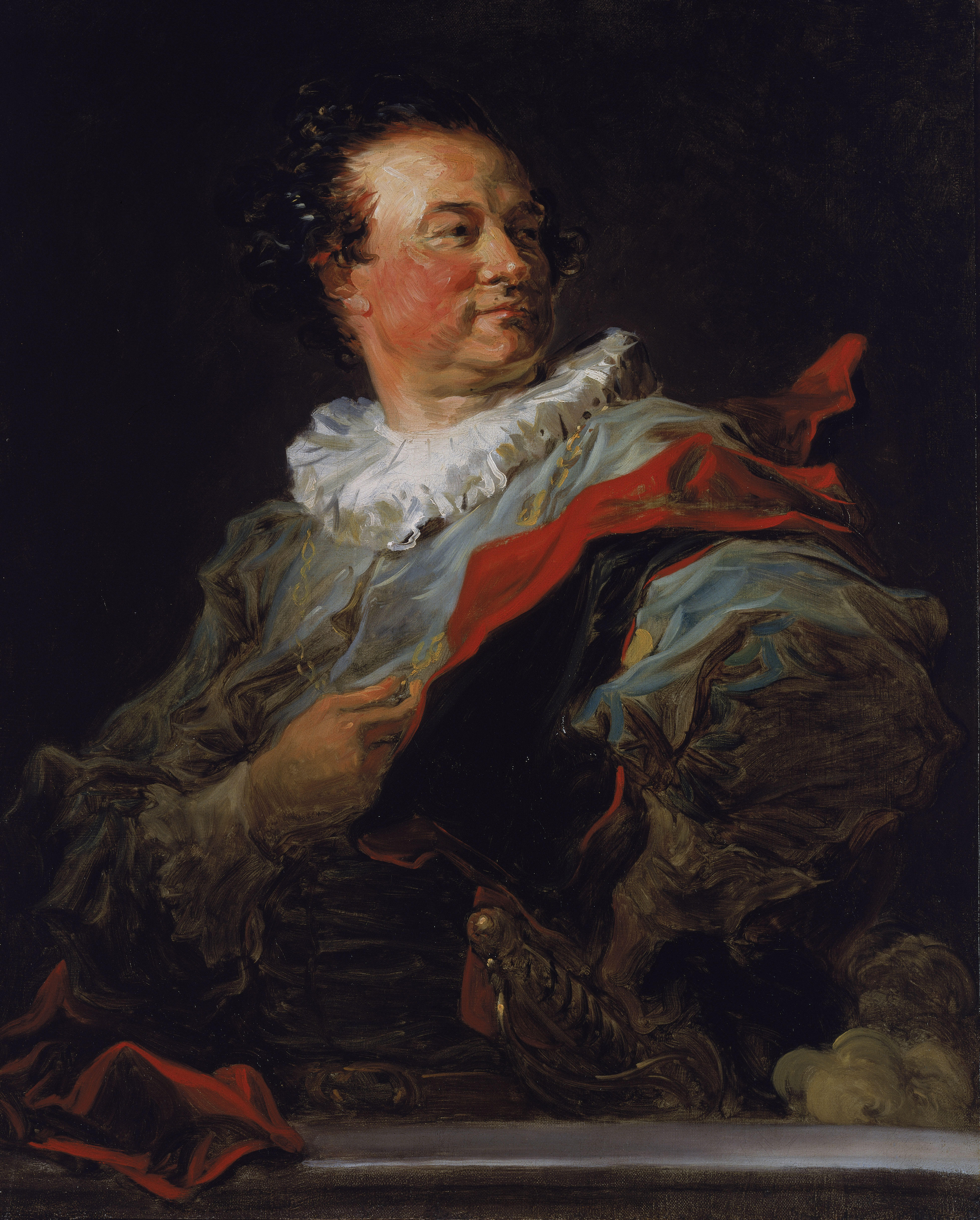
François-Henri d'Harcourt (1769), private collection

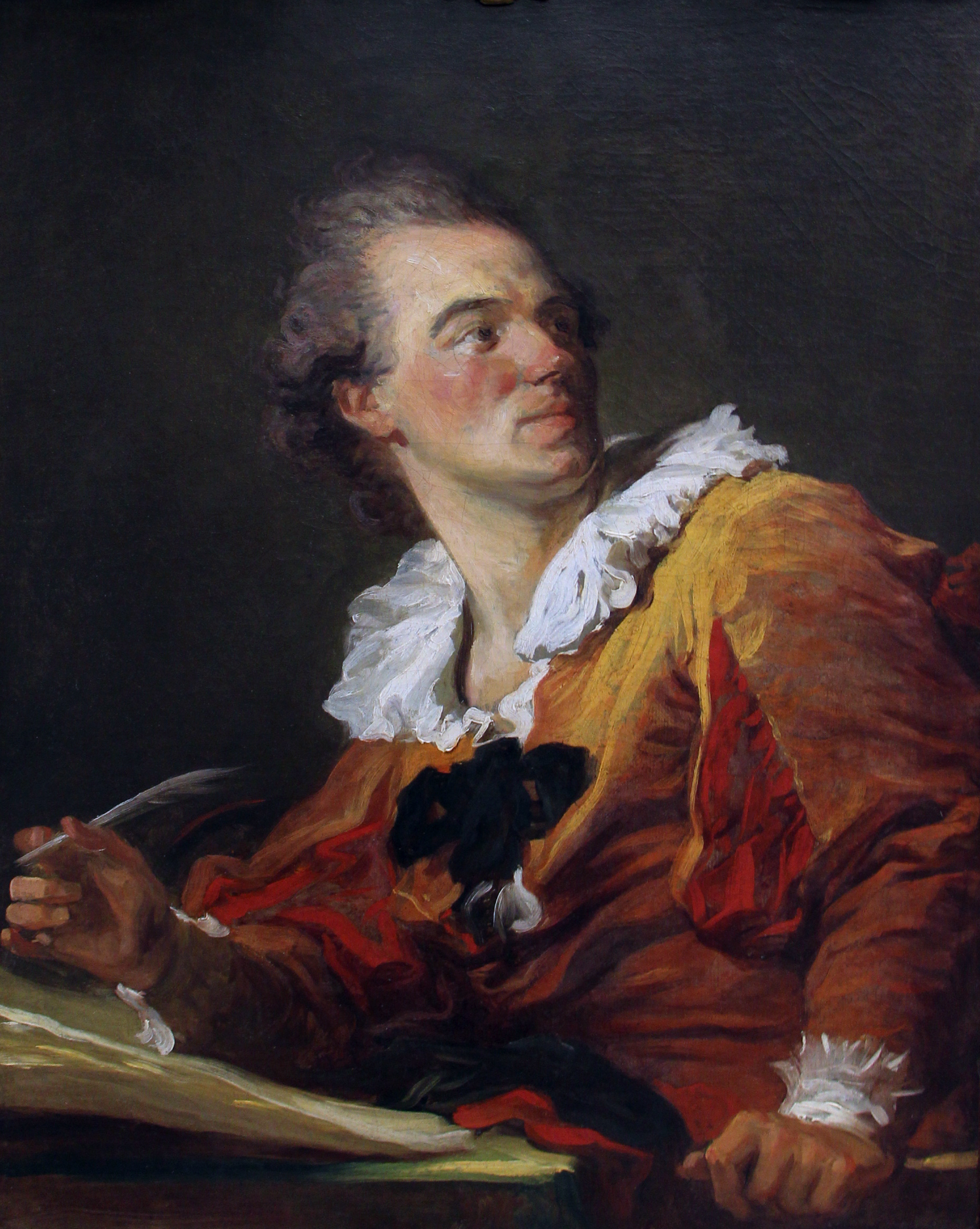
Inspiration (1769), Musée du Louvre, Paris

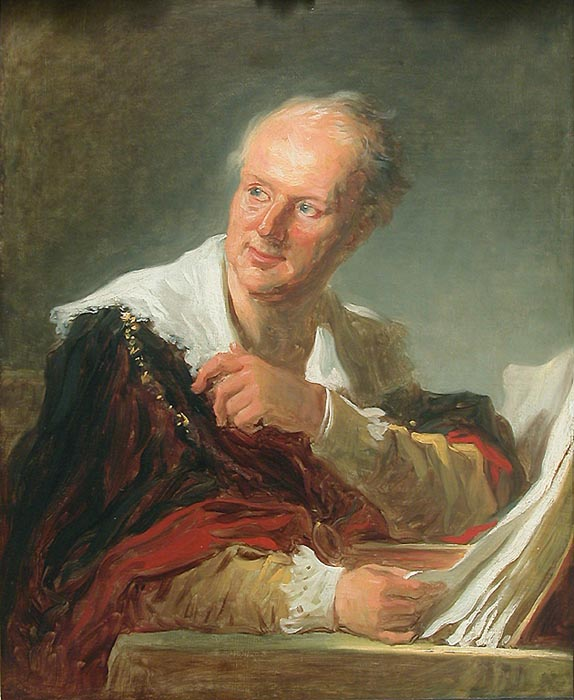
Portrait of a man (1769), Musée du Louvre, Paris

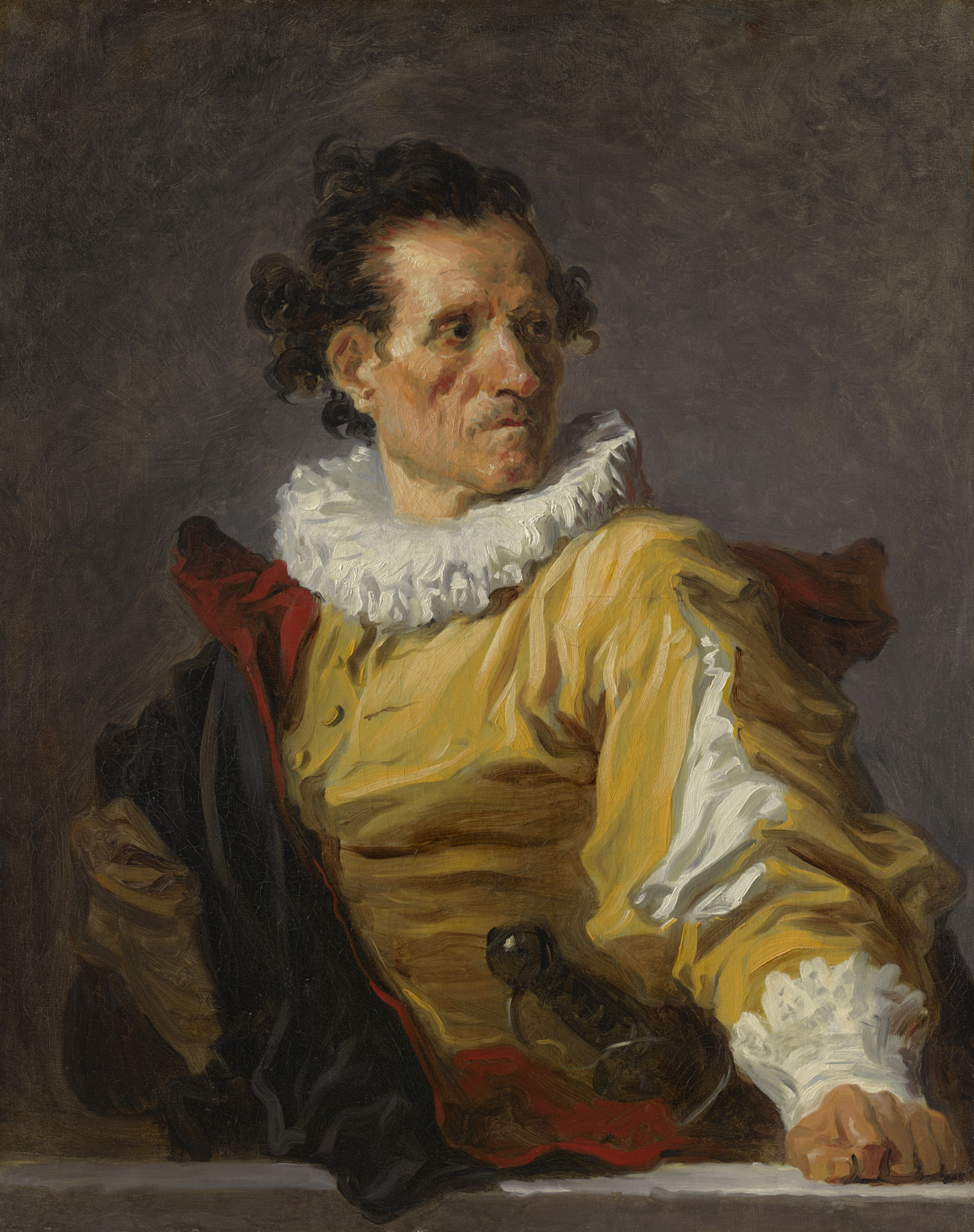
The Warrior (c. 1769), Clark Art Institute

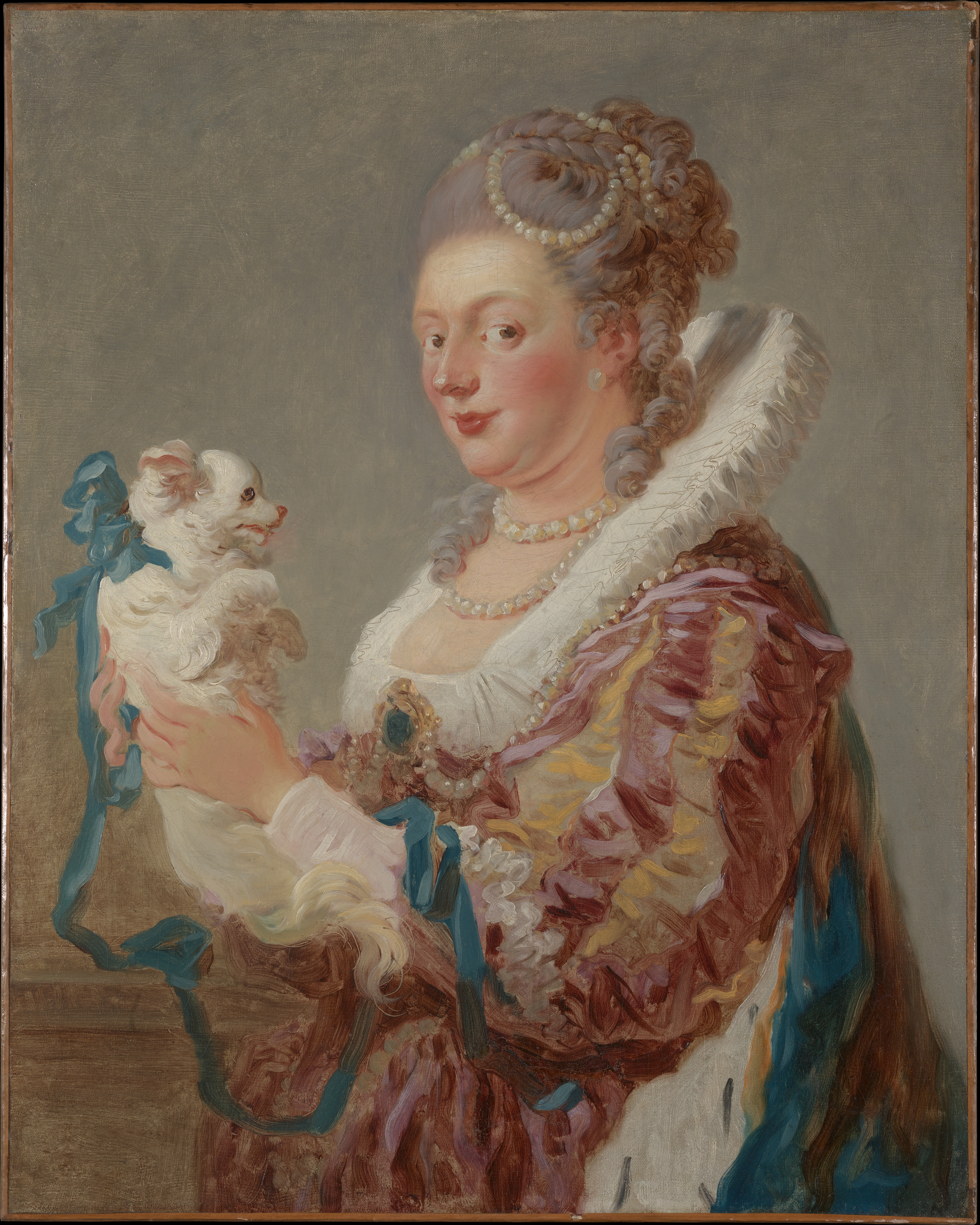
Portrait of a Woman with a dog (1769), The Metropolitan Museum of Art

== See also ==
- List of works by Fragonard
