= The Storm (Fragonard) =

Painting by Jean-Honoré Fragonard

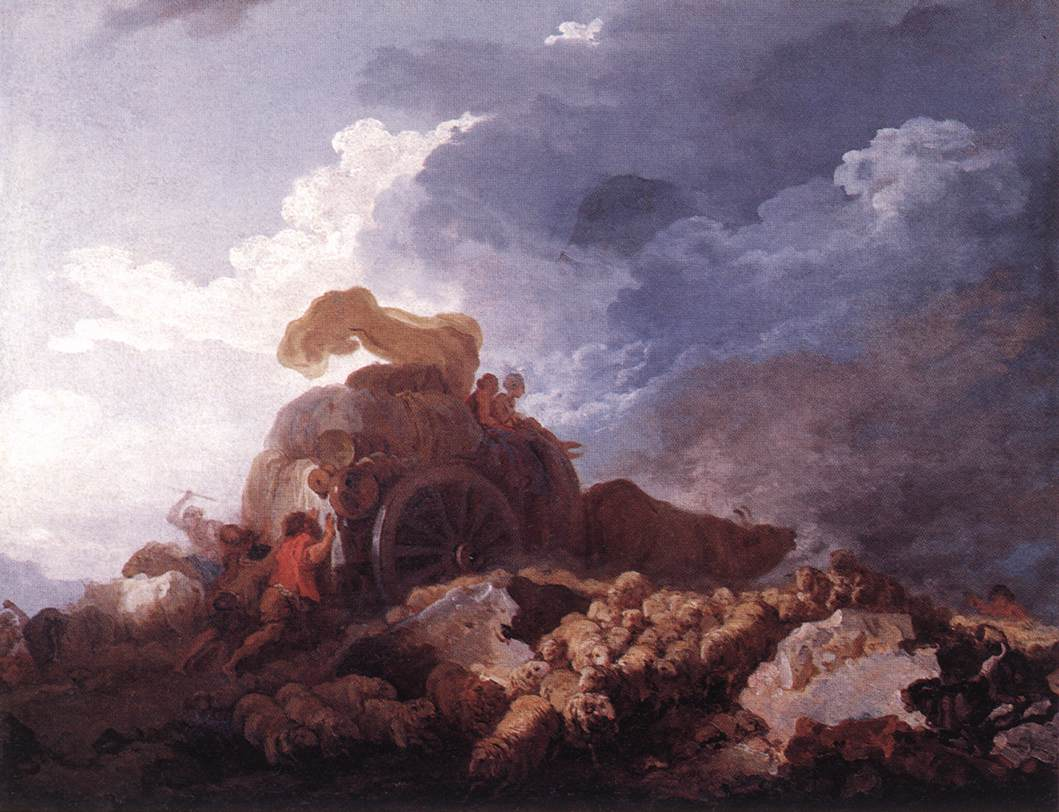
- Artist: Jean-Honoré Fragonard
- Year: c. 1759
- Medium: oil on canvas
- Dimensions: 73 cm × 97 cm (29 in × 38 in)
- Location: Louvre, Paris

The Storm (French: L'Orage) (also known as The Stalled Cart or Wagon in the Mud French: La Charrette embourbée) is an oil on canvas painting by Jean-Honoré Fragonard that hangs in the Louvre, in Paris. Painted during his time in Rome, it was inspired by the caravan pictures of Giovanni Benedetto Castiglione that were particularly admired in Paris. The painting, 0.73m high and 0.97m wide, was a bequest to the Louvre in 1869 from the collection of Louis La Caze. It was completed around 1759.

== Subject ==
The painting depicts an overloaded cart from an unusually low angle. The subject is similar to Castiglione’s pictures of overloaded vehicles, while the overcast sky and impending storm has more in common with the works of 17th century Dutch masters than with Italian models. The cart is stuck, and men are trying to push it forward from the rear while the ox bellows in front. Above, the wind whips the cover off the load, while below, sheep are huddled together for shelter. Above everything the storm races in over the sky, giving the moment its dramatic tension. Fragonard uses the paint to create forms that are indistinct and not clearly defined.

== Critical reception ==
Paul Bins, comte de Saint-Victor described the work as having “the poetry of a shipwreck.” The Goncourt brothers praised it liberally, and commented on the “smoky, gloomy, electric sky, shot with cracks of pale daylight.”

== Exhibition history ==
The painting was first shown to the Paris public in 1860 at an exhibition of 18th-century French masterpieces in the Boulevard des Italiens that had, until then, been kept in private collections. It caused a sensation and helped re-establish the reputation of Fragonard in the middle of the 19th century.

Since the 1980s the painting has frequently been exhibited internationally, including:

- 1982 - La peinture française du XVIIè au XIXè siècle, China International Exhibition Center, Beijing and Shanghai Art Museum
- 1987-88 - Jean-Honoré Fragonard, Grand Palais, Paris and Metropolitan Museum of Art, New York
- 1990-91 - Fragonard et Hubert Robert à Rome, Villa Medici, Rome
- 1995-6 - Le paysage dans la peinture occidentale du XVIe au XIXe siècle à travers les collections du Louvre, National Palace Museum, Taiwan
- 2006-7 - Jean Honoré Fragonard, CaixaForum Barcelona
- 2015-16 - Genre painting, Kyoto Municipal Museum of Art, The National Art Center, Tokyo
- 2023 - Qu'est ce qu'un paysage, Louvre-Lens

== Related works ==
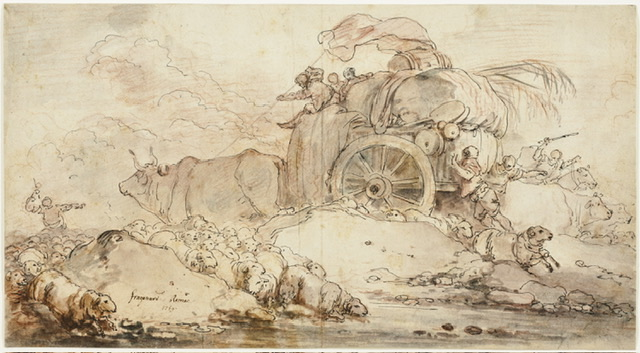
1759 preparatory drawing for The Storm

A preliminary drawing for the work - in which the subject is facing the opposite direction to the painting - executed in red chalk and brown ink is in the collection of the Art Institute of Chicago. A similar drawing is in the collection of the Museum of Fine Arts (Budapest). It has been attributed both to Fragonard and to Hubert Robert.

== See also ==
- List of works by Fragonard
