= The Music Lesson (Fragonard) =

1770s painting by Jean-Honoré Fragonard

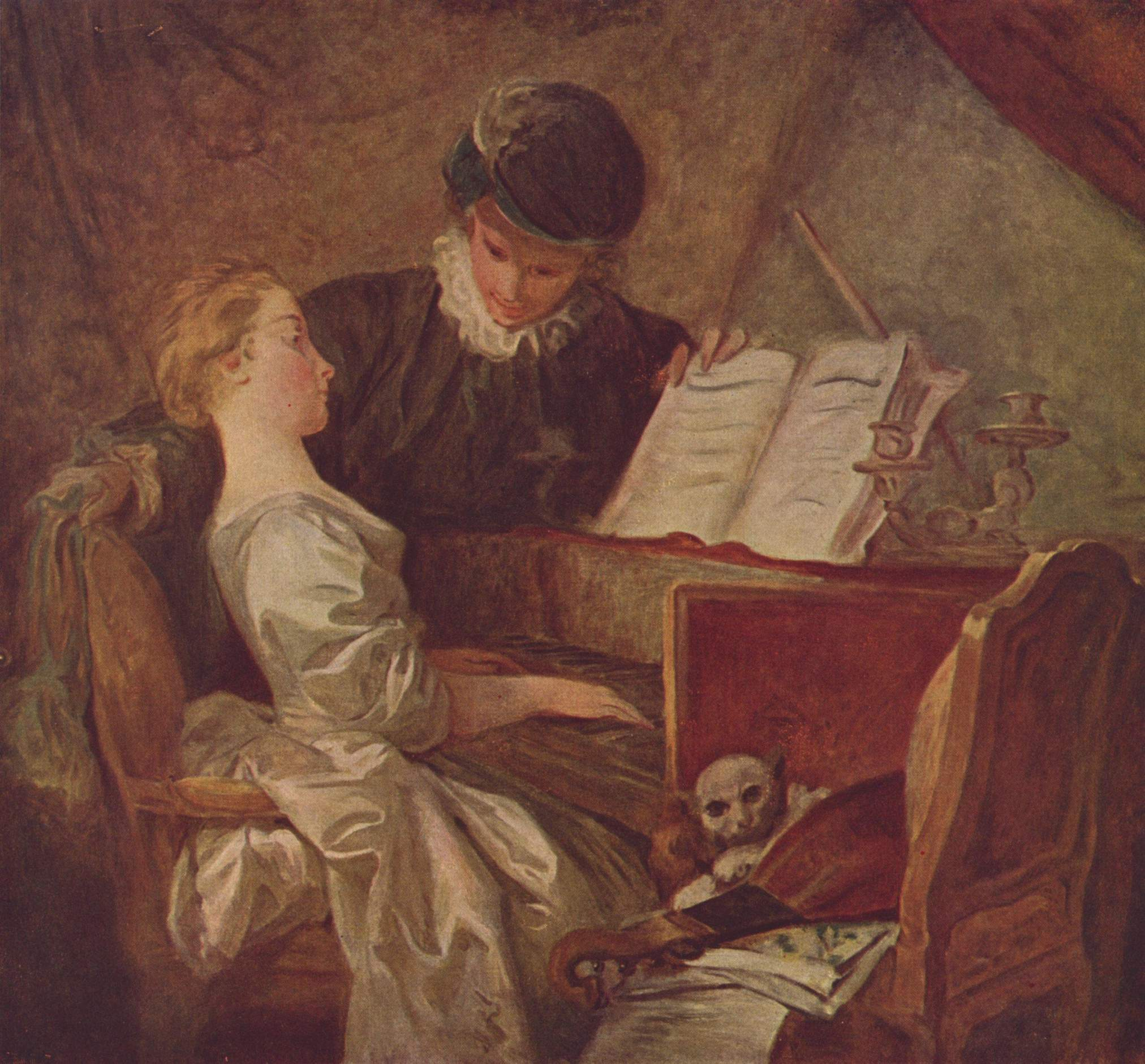
The Music Lesson (c. 1770) by Jean-Honoré Fragonard

The Music Lesson is an oil-on-canvas painting by the French artist Jean Honoré Fragonard, created c. 1770, now held in the Louvre, in Paris, to which it was donated by Hippolyte Walferdin in 1849.

The subject was a frequent one in the Dutch Golden Age, most famously Vermeer's work of the same title, and was a common allegory for the five senses in Baroque art. Fragonard converts the subject into a fête galante scene of dreamy love, with the young music teacher courting his pupil and looking at her cleavage.

== See also ==
- List of works by Fragonard
