= Jean-Claude Richard, Abbot of Saint-Non, Dressed à l'Espagnole =

Painting by Jean-Honoré Fragonard

Jean-Claude Richard, Abbot of Saint-Non, Dressed 'à l'Espagnole'
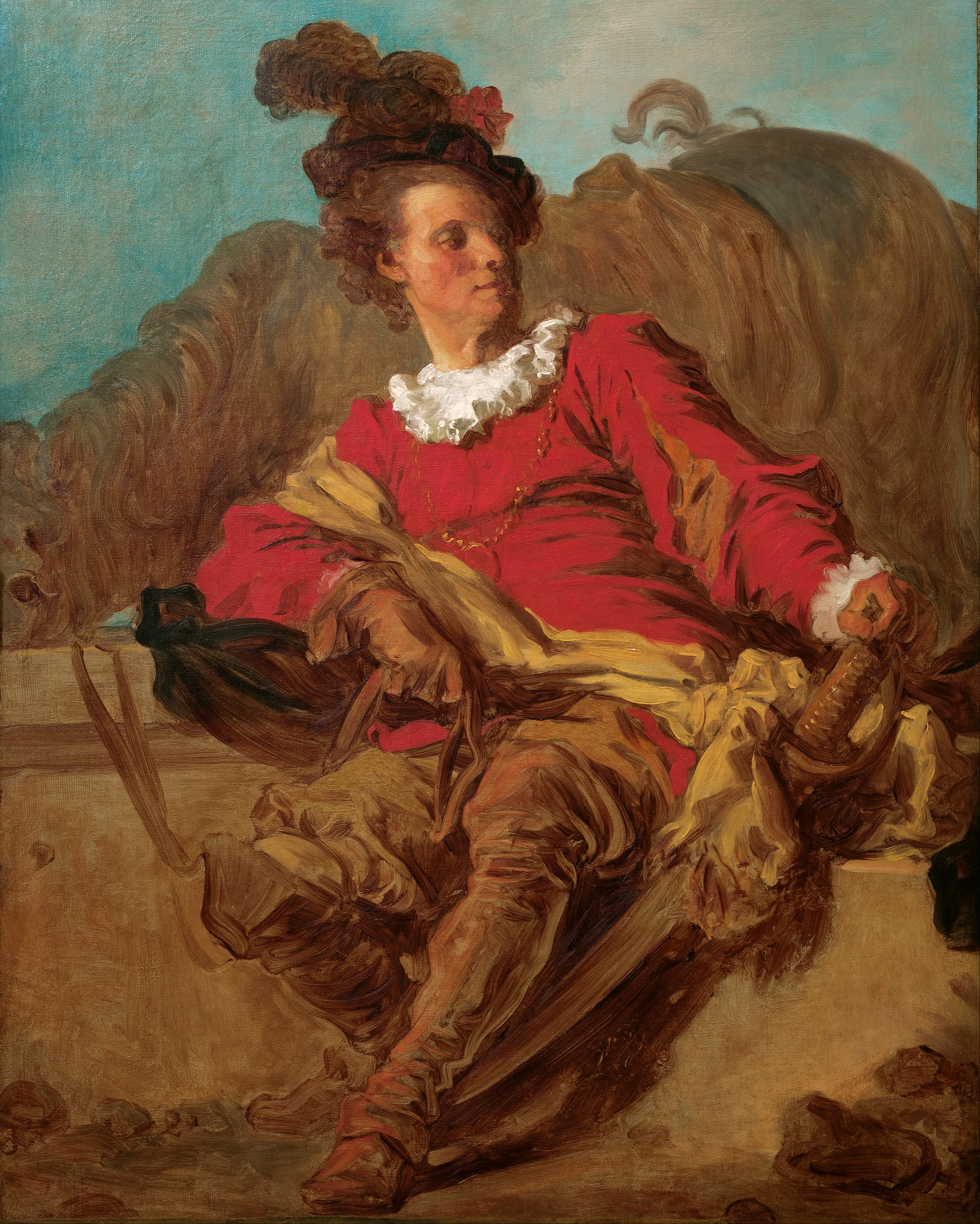
- Artist: Jean-Honoré Fragonard
- Year: c. 1769
- Medium: Oil on canvas
- Dimensions: 93.8 cm × 73.8 cm (36.9 in × 29.1 in)
- Location: Museu Nacional d'Art de Catalunya; Barcelona

The Jean-Claude Richard, Abbot of Saint-Non, Dressed à l'Espagnole is a painting by Jean-Honoré Fragonard conserved at the National Art Museum of Catalonia, in Barcelona, from c. 1769.

== Description ==
The knight, with his arrogant pose, is sitting beside a fountain in which his horse is drinking. He is dressed à l'espagnole, an expression which in eighteenth-century France was used to refer to picturesque or fancy attire, and had no bearing on the Spanish fashions of the time. In fact, dress à l'espagnole was inspired by French fashions from the time of Henry IV and Louis XIII. The picture is a work from the artist's youth, painted on a trip he made to Italy with his friend and patron Jean-Claude Richard. Fragonard was one of the last representatives of rococo painting and this work shows his most characteristic style: touches of light material known as 'virtuosity of speed'.

== See also ==
- List of works by Fragonard
