= List of works by Jean-Honoré Fragonard =

This incomplete list of works by Jean-Honoré Fragonard contains paintings and drawings in a variety of genres. Titles and dates often vary by source.

== Paintings ==
Image	Title	Date	Size	Collection	Medium	Notes
	The See-Saw	c. 1750–1752		Thyssen-Bornemisza Museum (Madrid)		
	Blind Man's Bluff	c. 1750–1752		Toledo Museum of Art		
	Jeroboam Sacrificing to Idols (French: Jéroboam sacrifiant aux idoles)	1752	115 x 145 cm	Académie des Beaux-Arts (Paris)	Oil on canvas	
	The Joys of Motherhood	c. 1752		Indianapolis Museum of Art		
	Psyche Showing Her Sisters Her Gifts from Cupid	1753		National Gallery (London)		
	The Birth of Venus	1753–1755		Musée Grobet-Labadié (Marseilles)		
	Diana and Endymion	c. 1753–1756	94.9 x 136.8 cm (37 3/8 x 53 7/8 in.)	National Gallery of Art (Washington, D.C.)		
	The Musical Contest	c. 1755				
	The Gardener	1754	58 3/4 × 36 3/4 in. (149.2 × 93.3 cm)	Detroit Institute of Arts	Oil on canvas	
	The Grape Gatherer	1754	59 1/8 × 33 3/4 inches (150.2 × 85.7 cm)	Detroit Institute of Arts	Oil on canvas	
	The Reaper	1754				
	The Shepherdess	1754				
	The Little Pilgrim	1755				
	Winter	1755		Los Angeles County Museum of Art		
	Aurora Triumphing over Night	c. 1755–66	95.3 x 131.4 cm (37 1/2 x 51 3/4 in.)	Museum of Fine Arts, Boston	Oil on canvas	
	Coresus Sacrificing Himself to Save Callirhoe	1765		Louvre (Paris)	Oil on canvas	
	The Swing	c. 1755				
	The Storm	c. 1759	73 x 97 cm	Louvre (Paris)		
	Landscape with Shepherds and Flock of Sheep	1763	52 x 73 cm	National Museum of Western Art (Tokyo)	Oil on canvas	
	The Trough	1763–1765				
	The Stolen Kiss	c. 1760		Metropolitan Museum of Art (New York City)		
	Happy Lovers	1760–1765		Norton Simon Museum (Pasadena, CA)		
	Music	1760–1765		Norton Simon Museum (Pasadena, CA)		
	The Little Park	1763		Wallace Collection, London		
	The Philosopher (Saint Jerome)	1764				
	Head of an Old Man	1765		Musée Jacquemart-André (Paris)		
	The Swing	1767	81 cm × 64.2 cm (31+7/8 in × 25+1/4 in)	Wallace Collection (London)		
	Jean-Claude Richard, Abbot of Saint-Non, Dressed à l'Espagnole	c. 1769	93.8 cm × 73.8 cm (36.9 in × 29.1 in)	Museu Nacional d'Art de Catalunya (Barcelona)		
	Fanciful Figure	1769		Louvre (Paris)		
	The Two Sisters	c. 1769		Metropolitan Museum of Art (New York City)		
	Young Woman with Brown Hair	1769		Fogg Museum (Cambridge, MA)		
	A Young Girl Reading (The Reader) (French: La Liseuse)	c. 1769		National Gallery of Art (Washington, D.C.)		
	François-Henri d'Harcourt	1769		Private collection		Fantastical Portraits (Portraits de fantaisie)
	Inspiration	1769		Louvre (Paris)		Fantastical Portraits (Portraits de fantaisie)
	Portrait of a Man (Denis Diderot)	c. 1769	82 x 65 cm	Louvre (Paris)	Oil on canvas	Fantastical Portraits (Portraits de fantaisie)
	Portrait of a Man (The Warrior)	c. 1769		Clark Art Institute (Williamstown, MA)		Fantastical Portraits (Portraits de fantaisie)
	The Woman With A Dog	1769		Metropolitan Museum of Art (New York City)		Fantastical Portraits (Portraits de fantaisie)
	The Music Lesson	c. 1770		Louvre (Paris)		
	The Model's First Session (Les Débuts du modèle)	c. 1770		Musée Jacquemart-André (Paris)		
	The Raised Chemise (Note: Pendant to The Burning Fuse.) (La Chemise enlevée)	c. 1770		Louvre (Paris)		
	Allegory of Vigilance	c. 1772		Metropolitan Museum of Art (New York City)		
	The Goddess Minerva	c. 1772		Detroit Institute of Arts	Oil on canvas	
	Woman Looking in a Mirror	c. 1772		Utah Museum of Fine Arts (Salt Lake City)		
	Love as Folly	c. 1773-1776		National Gallery of Art (Washington, D.C.)	Oil on canvas	
	Love the Sentinel	c. 1773-1776		National Gallery of Art (Washington, D.C.)	Oil on canvas	
	The Love Letter	1770–1775				
	Girl with Dog	1770–1775		Alte Pinakothek (Munich)		
	The Pre-arranged Flight	1772–73		Fogg Museum (Cambridge, MA)		
	The Adoration of the Shepherds (Note: Pendant to The Bolt.)	c. 1775		Louvre (Paris)		
	The Happy Family	c. 1775		National Gallery of Art (Washington, D.C.)		
	The Visit to the Nursery	c. 1775	73 x 92.1 cm (28 3/4 x 36 1/4 in.)	National Gallery of Art (Washington, D.C.)		
	A Game of Hot Cockles	c. 1775–1780				
	The Pursuit	1771–72	125 1/8 x 84 7/8 in. (317.8 x 215.6 cm)	Frick Collection (New York City)	Oil on canvas	The Progress of Love (Les Progrès de l'amour)
	The Meeting	1771–72	125 x 96 in. (317.5 x 243.8 cm)	Frick Collection (New York City)	Oil on canvas	The Progress of Love (Les Progrès de l'amour)
	Love Letters	1771–72	124 7/8 x 85 3/8 in. (317.2 x 216.9 cm)	Frick Collection (New York City)	Oil on canvas	The Progress of Love (Les Progrès de l'amour)
	The Lover Crowned	1771–72	125 1/8 x 95 3/4 in. (317.8 x 243.2 cm)	Frick Collection (New York City)	Oil on canvas	The Progress of Love (Les Progrès de l'amour)
	Reverie	c. 1790–91	125 1/8 x 77 5/8 in. (317.8 x 197.2 cm)	Frick Collection (New York City)	Oil on canvas	The Progress of Love (Les Progrès de l'amour)
	Blind Man's Buff	c. 1775–1780		Timken Museum of Art (San Diego)		
	Constance de Lowendal	1775–1785		São Paulo Museum of Art		
	The Bolt (Note: Pendant to The Adoration of the Shepherds.)	1777				
	The Stolen Kiss	1787		Hermitage Museum (Saint Petersburg)		
	The Beloved Child	1780s		Fogg Museum (Cambridge, MA)		
	The First Steps	1780s		Fogg Museum (Cambridge, MA)		
	The Angora Cat					
	Boy Attempting to Restrain a Cow by a Rope			Museum of Fine Arts, Houston		
	The Burning Fuse (Note: Pendant to The Raised Chemise.) (Le feu aux poudres)			Louvre (Paris)		
	The Beautiful Servant			Nationalmuseum (Stockholm)		
	In the Wheat					
	Pastoral Landscape with a Shepherd and Shepherdess at Rest					
	Two Girls on a Bed Playing with their Dogs					
	Cephalus and Procris			Musée des Beaux Arts d'Angers		
	The Sacrifice of Callirhoë			Real Academia de Bellas Artes de San Fernando (Madrid)		
	Coresus and Callirhoe			Musée des Beaux-Arts d'Angers	Oil sketch	
	The Souvenir (French: Le Chiffre d'amour)	1775-1778	9.9 in x 7.4 in (25.2 cm x 19 cm)	Wallace Collection	Oil on panel	

== Drawings ==
Image	Title	Date	Size	Collection	Medium	Notes
	Portrait of Bergeret	1770–1	sheet: 18 7/8 x 14 5/16 in. (48 x 36.4 cm); image: 15 1/4 x 11 5/16 in. (38.8 x 28.7 cm)	Metropolitan Museum of Art (New York City)		
	A Gathering at Wood's Edge	1770–3	14 3/4 x 19 3/8 in. (37.5 x 49.2 cm)			
	Nègrepelisse Castle near Montauban	1773	36.2 x 48.4 cm	Museum Boijmans Van Beuningen (Rotterdam)		
	A Shaded Avenue	1774		The Getty (Los Angeles)		
	Cypress Avenue at the Villa d'Este in Tivoli	1774		Albertina (Vienna)		
	The Party Cook	c. 1775		Wallraf–Richartz Museum (Cologne)		
	Young Woman Standing	1775–8		Rijksmuseum (Amsterdam)		
	The Armoire	1778		National Gallery of Art (Washington, D.C.)		
	To the Genius of Franklin	c. 1778		White House (Washington, D.C.)		
	White Bull and a Dog in a Stable			Albertina (Vienna)		
	A Young Woman Dozing					
	The Girl with the Marmot					
