= The Triumph of Venus =

Painting by François Boucher

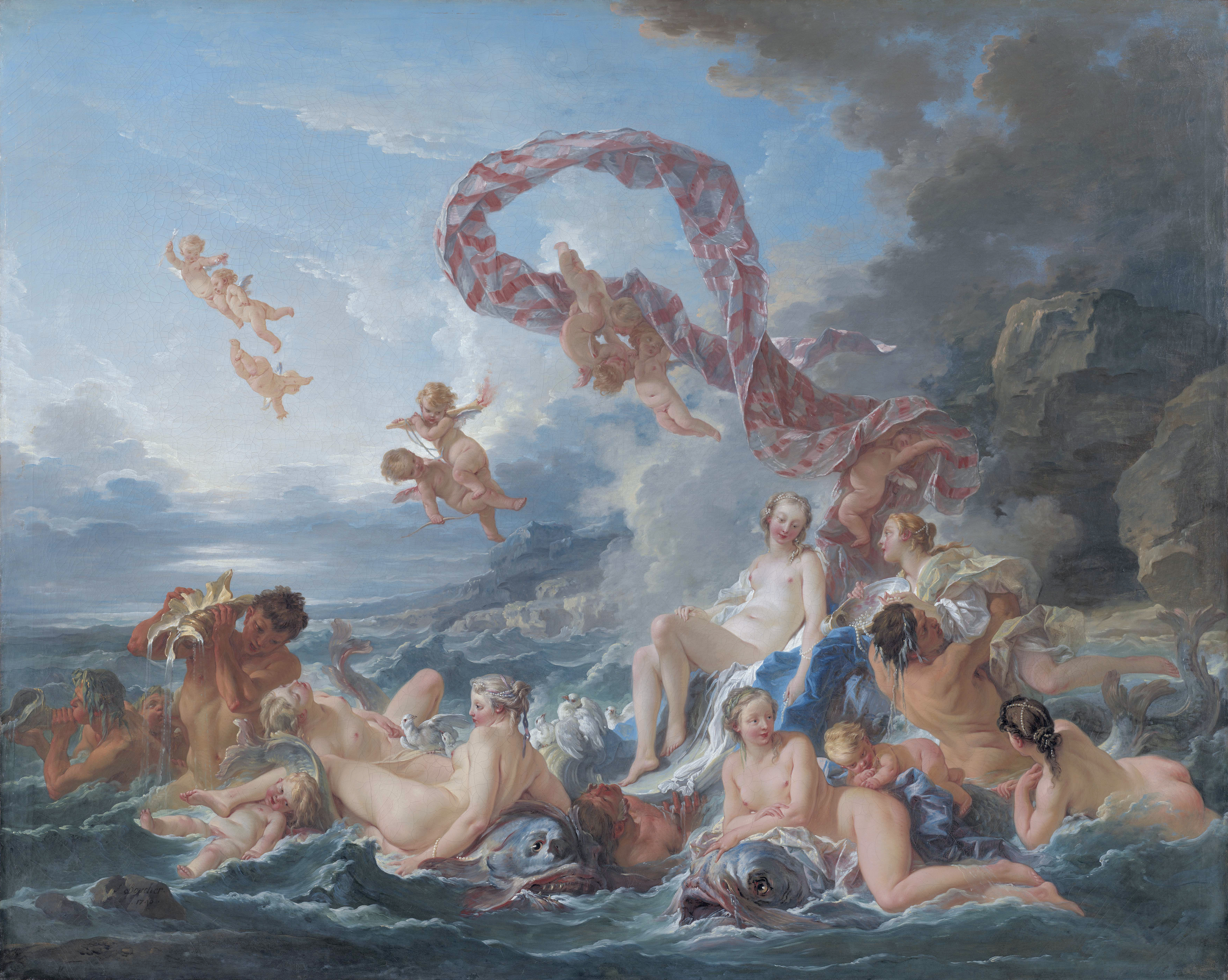
- Artist: François Boucher
- Year: 1740
- Medium: oil on canvas
- Dimensions: 130 cm × 162 cm (51 in × 64 in)
- Location: Nationalmuseum, Stockholm

The Triumph of Venus is a 1740 oil-on-canvas painting in Rococo style by the French artist François Boucher. It inspired The Birth of Venus by Jean-Honoré Fragonard.

The painting was one of the large number of drawings and paintings acquired by Carl Gustaf Tessin during his stay in Paris, but he had to sell it off part of his collection to the king of Sweden in 1749 after he experienced financial troubles. The painting is now in the Nationalmuseum in Stockholm.
