= The Raised Chemise =

Painting by Jean-Honoré Fragonard

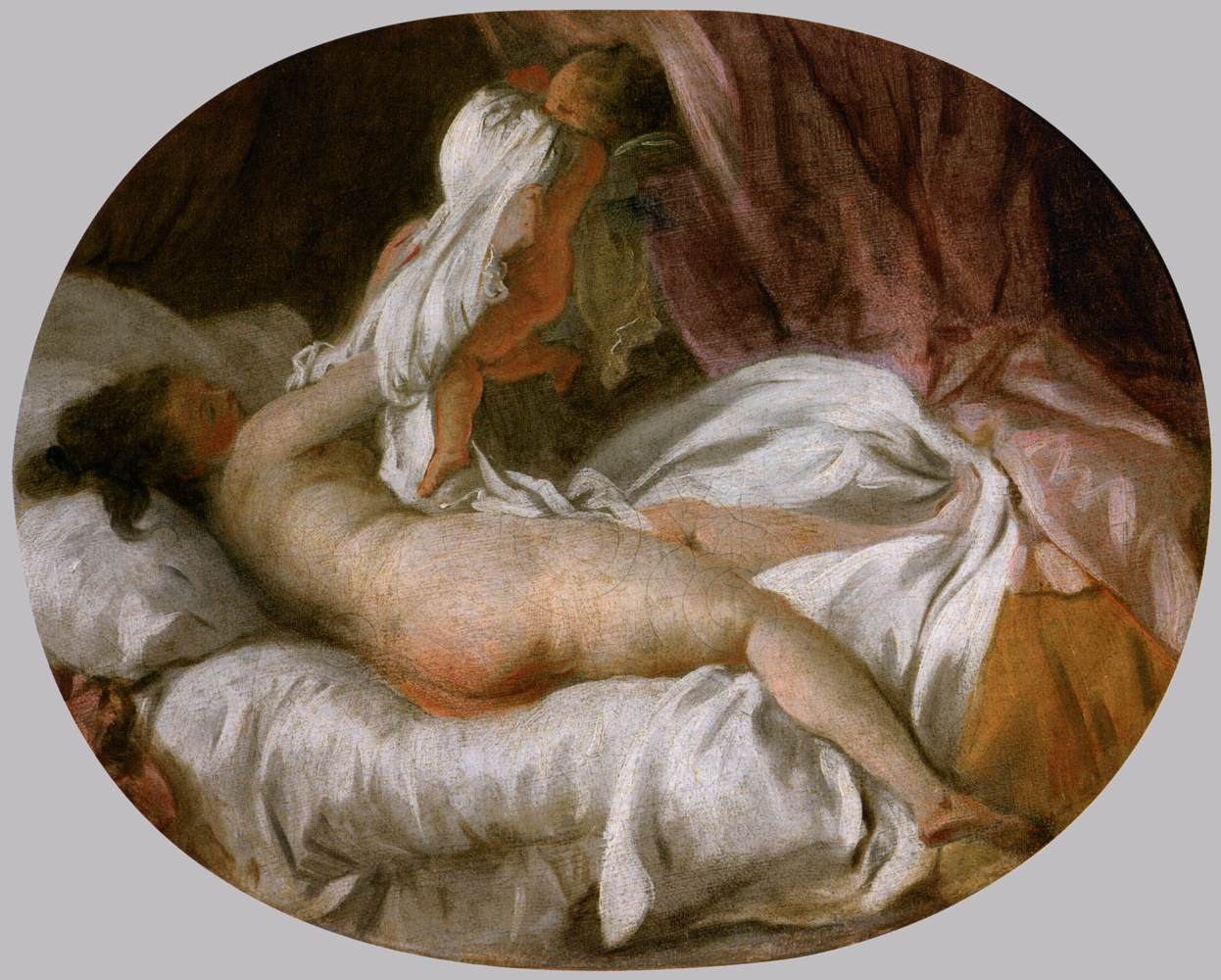
The Raised Chemise (c. 1770) by Jean-Honoré Fragonard

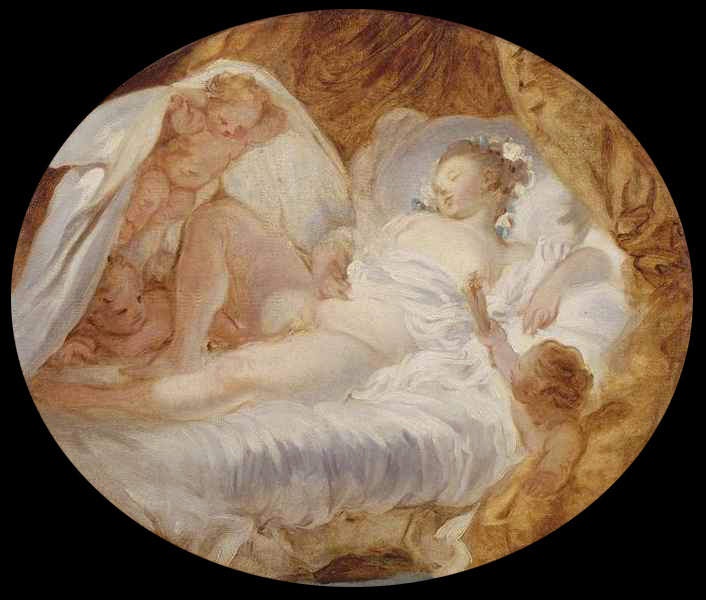
Le feu aux poudres, pendant to La Chemise enlevée.

The Raised Chemise or The Shift Withdrawn (La Chemise enlevée ) is a small c.1770 oil-on-canvas painting by Jean-Honoré Fragonard, now in the Louvre in Paris, to which it was left by Dr Louis La Caze in 1869. Its earlier but similarly small pendant Fire to the Gunpowder (Le Feu aux poudres) was in Carlos de Beistegui's collection and is now also in the Louvre.

It was exhibited in Paris in 1860, helping the frères Goncourt rescue Fragonard from the obscurity into which he had fallen after the French Revolution, albeit only as a frivolous painter – his skill as a history painter was not recognised until the 20th century.

== See also ==
- List of works by Fragonard
