= Psyche Showing Her Sisters Her Gifts from Cupid =

1753 painting by Jean-Honoré Fragonard

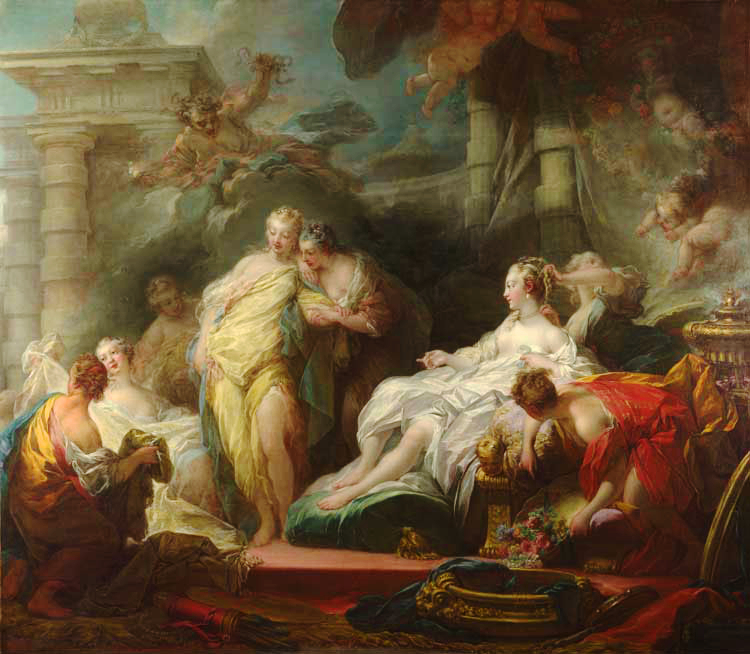
- Artist: Jean-Honoré Fragonard
- Year: 1753
- Medium: Oil on canvas
- Dimensions: 168.3 cm × 192.4 cm (66.3 in × 75.7 in)
- Location: National Gallery; London

Psyche Showing Her Sisters Her Gifts from Cupid is an oil painting by the French artist Jean-Honoré Fragonard, painted in 1753, in the National Gallery in London. Its dimensions are 168.3 by 192.4 cm (66.3 by 75.7 in).

== History ==
The painting was executed by Fragonard at the age of 21 when he was still a student at the École des Élèves Protégés, which was under the direction of Carle Vanloo. Students at the academy were required to prepare an artwork for presentation to the King of France at Versailles; Fragonard's painting was one of several presented to Louis XV in 1753. It was highly successful, but fell in critical esteem for a period when it was also attributed to Vanloo. In 1752–1753, before enrolling in the academy, Fragonard had studied with François Boucher, and the influence of his master can be seen in some details of this work.

== Description ==
The painting illustrates the classical story of Cupid and Psyche, originally told by Apuleius in The Golden Ass, but Fragonard drew more heavily on a retelling by Jean de La Fontaine, Les Amours de Psiché et Cupidon (1669). The god Cupid would visit his lover Psyche only at night, and forbade her to look at him. The painting shows Psyche, seated at right in a white garment, waiting for her two sisters along with various nymphs at the palace of Cupid, where she shows the gifts she has received from her lover. The two envious sisters persuade Psyche to reveal her lover's identity in order to break the faith between the two of them.

An allegorical figure personifying the sisters' envy (sometimes identified as Eris, the goddess of discord) appears above the sisters clutching snakes in its hands. It has been noted that the portrayal of Psyche may have been inspired by Louis XV's chief mistress, Madame de Pompadour.

In its current state there are details missing from the painting, as it has been cut down from its original form. Around 26 cm was lost from the top and 35 cm on the left-hand side. The remaining details that still can be viewed show various luxurious items, including golden vases, a perfume burner, flowers, jewels, and Cupid's quiver.

The painting is heavily influenced by Boucher's tapestry design of 1737 on the subject of Cupid and Psyche. However, Fragonard's work shows more movement and has sharper colours, such as the pale lemon dress in acidic tones worn by one of the sisters, which may denote her jealousy towards Psyche. The rose and blue tonality of Boucher has been replaced with a gold and orange more characteristic of Fragonard, showing the early development of his individual palette. These colours are at their most concentrated in the flowers laid at the foot of Psyche's throne, which has been described as "the area of the painting most clearly 'in focus'". By contrast, the other parts of the painting towards the periphery lose focus and use darker tones, which hint at the future disasters in the story of Psyche and Cupid.

== See also ==
- List of works by Fragonard
