= François Walferdin =

French politician, physicist, art collector, editor and writer

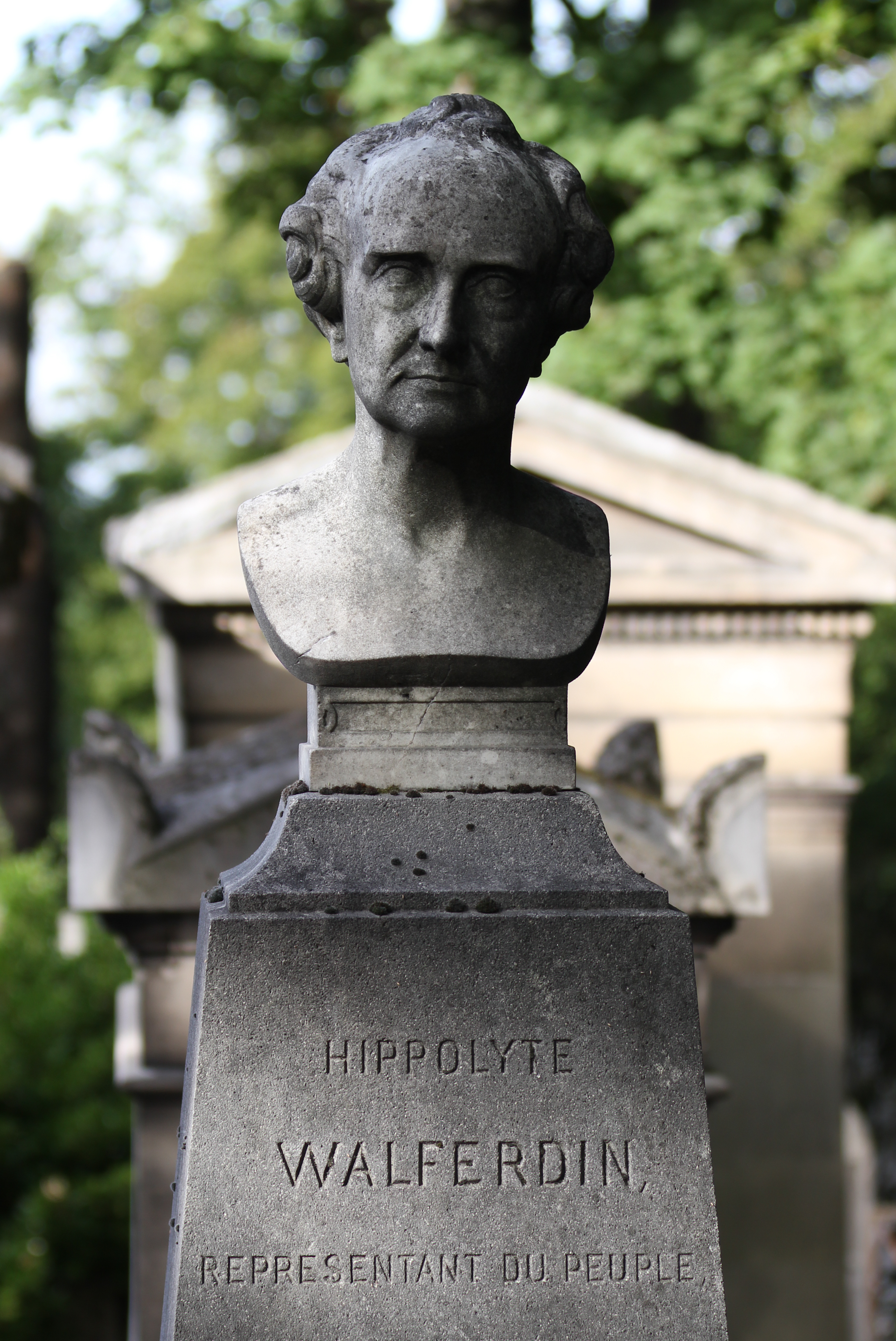
Bust by Bonnardel of Walfardin's tomb in Père-Lachaise Cemetery.

François Hippolyte Walferdin (8 June 1795 – 25 January 1880) was a French politician, physicist, art collector, editor, and writer.

== Life ==
=== Civil service and politics ===
Born in Langres, he entered the civil service very young, in customs and then the weights and measures department of the treasury. Very liberal in political outlook, in 1848 he became commissioner in Haute-Marne for the provisional government, but his civil service work eventually forced him to give up that role. On 23 April 1848 he was elected Haute-Marne's representative to the Assemblée constituante, resigning from his civil service work. He sat on the left with the moderates and joined the commerce and industry committee as well as on 26 May 1848 signing the request which ensured future representatives' names and votes appeared in the Moniteur.

He voted for the Orléans family's exile, the proceedings against Louis Blanc and Caussidière, the abolition of capital punishment and the entirety of the constitution and against progressive taxation, the incompatibility of roles, the Grévy amendment, the people's sanction of the Constitution, the Rateau proposal, the ban on clubs and the Rome Expedition. Opposing the Élysée's policy, he did not gain election to the Législative and stood for the opposition on 22 June 1857 as a candidate for the Corps législatif in the first subscription for Haute-Marne. He was beaten by the government candidate Monsieur de Lespérut and retired into private life, receiving the Légion d'honneur in 1844 for his scientific work.

=== Science and art ===
He was a friend of François Arago, with whom he studied different physics questions. He also took part in the search for the Grenelle artesian springs in Paris and was one of the founder's of the Société géologique de France. He designed a hypsometer, a barometer, the hypso-thermometer, the hydrolocometer (underwater), and several other instruments such as maxima and minima thermometers specially designed to measure the temperature of hot springs or artesian wells; these thermometers are also called discharge (or spillway) thermometers. He also sought to establish the law of crossing temperature variation inside the Earth, a law recent discoveries had radically rewritten.

He had a passion for Denis Diderot, also born in Langres, owning a drawing of him by Jean-Baptiste Greuze and collaborating with édition Brière on Diderot's works, editing Salon de 1759 in L'Artiste (9 March 1845), then Salons (1763, 1771, 1775, 1781 and the unedited section of the Salon for 1769) in issues 38-40 of the Revue de Paris in 1857. He was also a great art collector, amassing 80 paintings and over 700 drawings by Jean Honoré Fragonard, helping to bring him out of the oblivion into which he had fallen since the French Revolution. He also planned a complete edition of the Salons from the available texts in Saint Petersburg.

=== Death ===
He died in Paris, leaving the Louvre his 80 Fragonard paintings (including a portrait of Diderot and The Music Lesson) and Houdon busts of Diderot, Mirabeau, Benjamin Franklin, and George Washington, as well a Jean-Robert-Nicolas Lucas de Montigny bust of Mirabeau. He was buried in the 24th division of the Père-Lachaise Cemetery.

== Works ==
- Notice sur les travaux scientifiques de M. H. Walferdin (in French). Paris: Bachelier. 1852.
- De la dernière représentation du Mariage de Figaro au Théâtre-Français, le jeudi 2 novembre 1820, ou Histoire de ses mutilations depuis sa naissance jusqu'à nos jours (in French). Paris: les marchands de nouveautés. 1820.
