= The Visit to the Nursery =

1775 painting by Jean-Honoré Fragonard

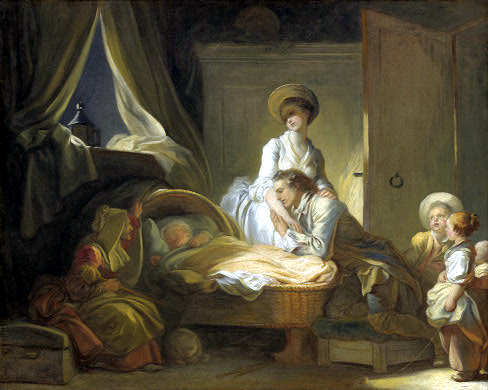
- Artist: Jean-Honoré Fragonard
- Year: c. 1775
- Medium: Oil on canvas
- Dimensions: 73 cm × 92.1 cm (29 in × 36.3 in)
- Location: National Gallery of Art; Washington, D.C.

The Visit to the Nursery is an oil-on-canvas painting by French artist Jean-Honoré Fragonard, created c. 1775, now held in the National Gallery of Art in Washington, D.C., which it entered in 1946 as part of the Samuel H. Kress collection. It was previously identified with a work auctioned in a 1780 sale of Fragonard's major client Jean François Leroy de Senneville (1715 – 1784), a fermier général, and then re-auctioned four years later, but a work more closely matching that work's description was rediscovered around 2009 in a collection in Estonia.

== See also ==
- List of works by Fragonard
