= Blind Man's Bluff (Fragonard, 1750) =

Painting by Jean-Honoré Fragonard

- Le collin maillard (French)
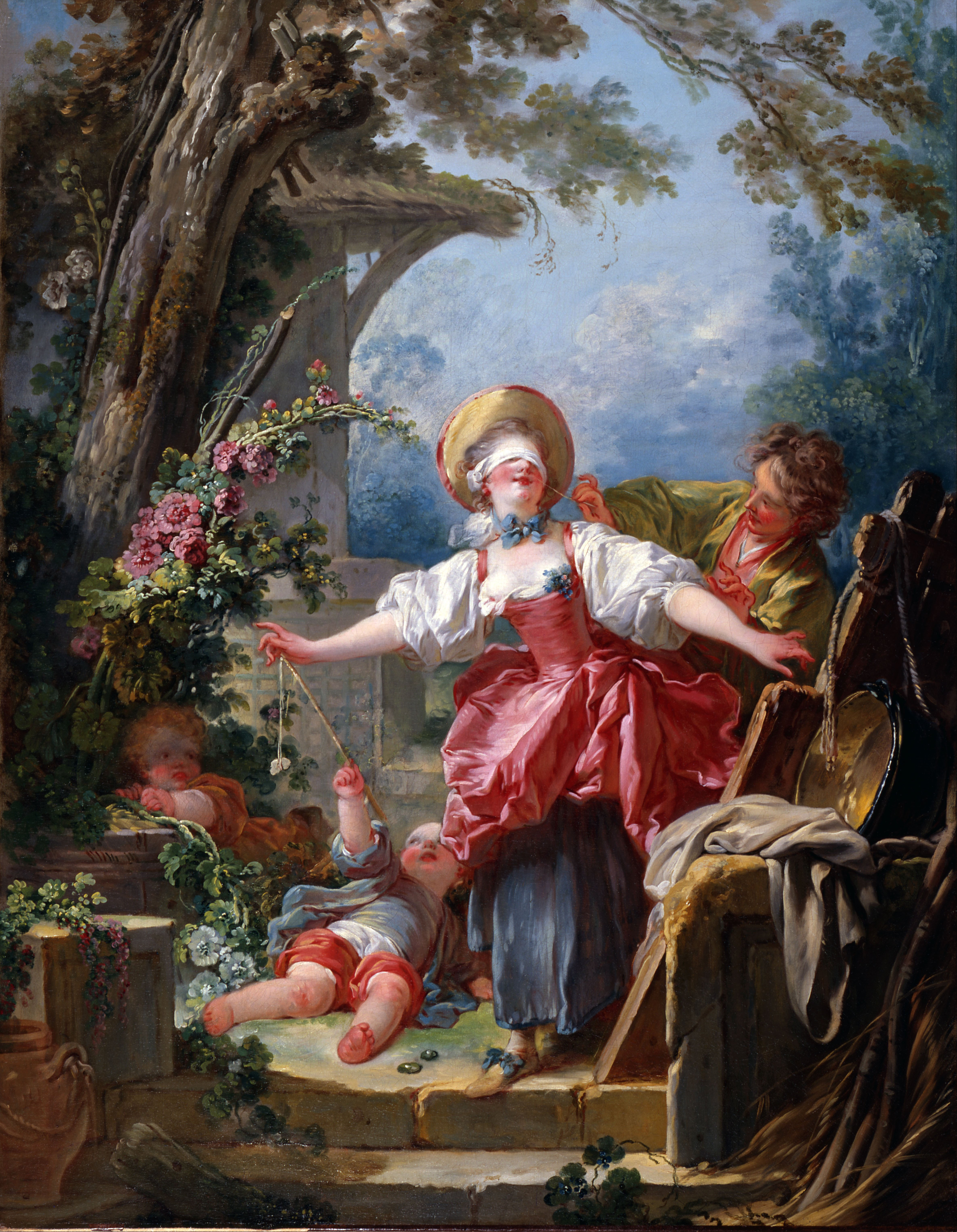
- Artist: Jean-Honoré Fragonard
- Year: c. 1750–1752
- Medium: oil on canvas
- Dimensions: 116.8 cm × 91.4 cm (46.0 in × 36.0 in)
- Location: Toledo Museum of Art, Toledo, Ohio

Blind Man's Bluff (French: Le collin maillard) is a painting by the French Rococo painter Jean-Honoré Fragonard, produced around 1750 in oil on canvas. It is held by the Toledo Museum of Art in Toledo, Ohio, United States, which purchased it with funds from the Libbey Endowment, a gift of the glass manufacturer Edward Libbey who founded the museum in 1901.

The artist also produced another work of the same title some time between 1775 and 1780, which is held in the Samuel H. Kress Collection. Eighteenth-century engravings were produced of both paintings, showing that they may have originally been as much as a foot higher at the top.

== Background and content ==
The painting is full of deceptions – the girl is looking out from under her blindfold and the game seems to be a pretext leading to seduction; the two figures are in pastoral costume, but may be noble or bourgeois figures playing at being pastoral figures; the background seems to be a wood but could be a stage set. In short, it seems to abolish the boundary between truth and lies, reality and fiction.

The Toledo Museum of Art, where the painting is located, describes the work: "Playfully erotic and sensuously painted, Jean-Honoré Fragonard's scene of youthful flirtation fulfils the eighteenth-century aristocratic French taste for romantic pastoral themes. The figures are beautifully dressed in rustic but improbably clean and fashionable clothes; the woman's shoes even have elegant bows on them."

The painting was a companion piece The See-Saw (1750), currently held by the Thyssen-Bornemisza Museum in Madrid. Both draw heavily on the style of François Boucher, Fragonard's teacher. Boucher's influence can be seen in the framework of luxuriant vegetation, but the careful composition of the scene is Fragonard's own. Blindman's bluff is a metaphor for courtship, while the back-and-forth movement of the see-saw in the companion piece is, perhaps, a metaphor for the sexual act.

== See also ==
- List of works by Fragonard
