= Blind Man's Buff (Fragonard, 1775–1780) =

Painting by Jean-Honoré Fragonard

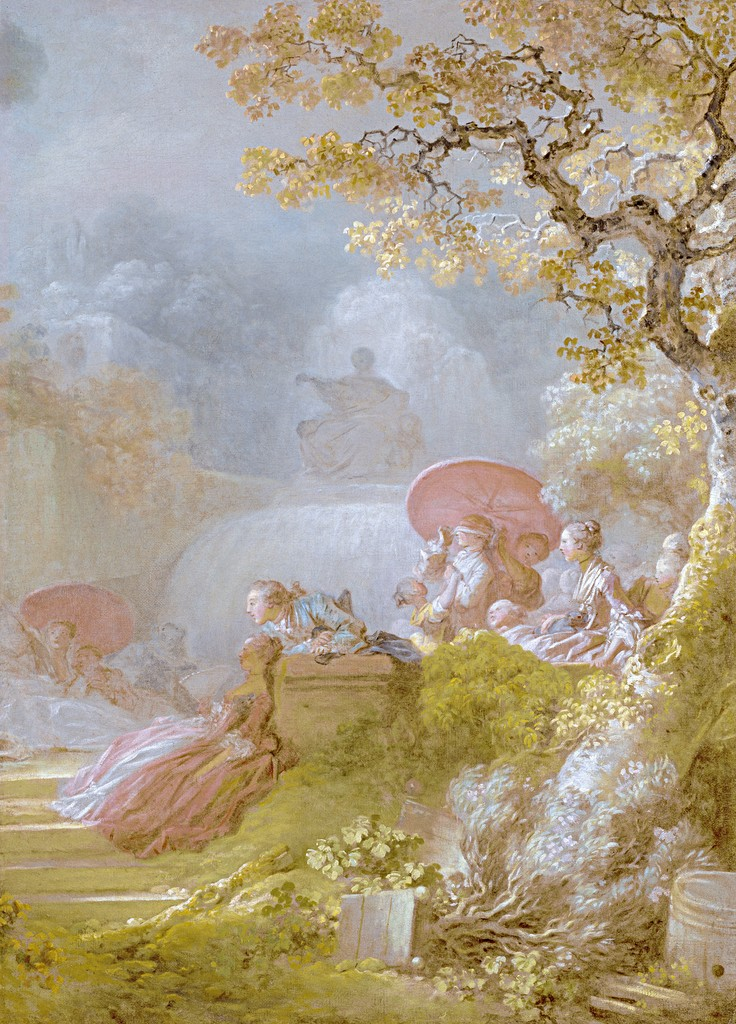
Blind Man's Buff (1775–1780) by Jean-Honoré Fragonard

Blind Man's Buff is an oil-on-canvas painting by Jean-Honoré Fragonard, produced ca. 1775–1780 after the artist's second journey to Italy in 1773–74. It is now in the Timken Museum of Art in San Diego, California.

Well-dressed men, women, and children play the familiar game in a picturesque overgrown garden. Fragonard's favorite subject, he may have viewed the game as symbolizing the game of courtship. According to eighteenth-century engravings of the painting and another earlier version of the subject, both may have originally been as much as a foot higher at the top.

== See also ==
- List of works by Fragonard
