= The Stolen Kiss (painting) =

Painting by Jean-Honoré Fragonard and Marguerite Gérard

- Le Baiser à la dérobée (French)
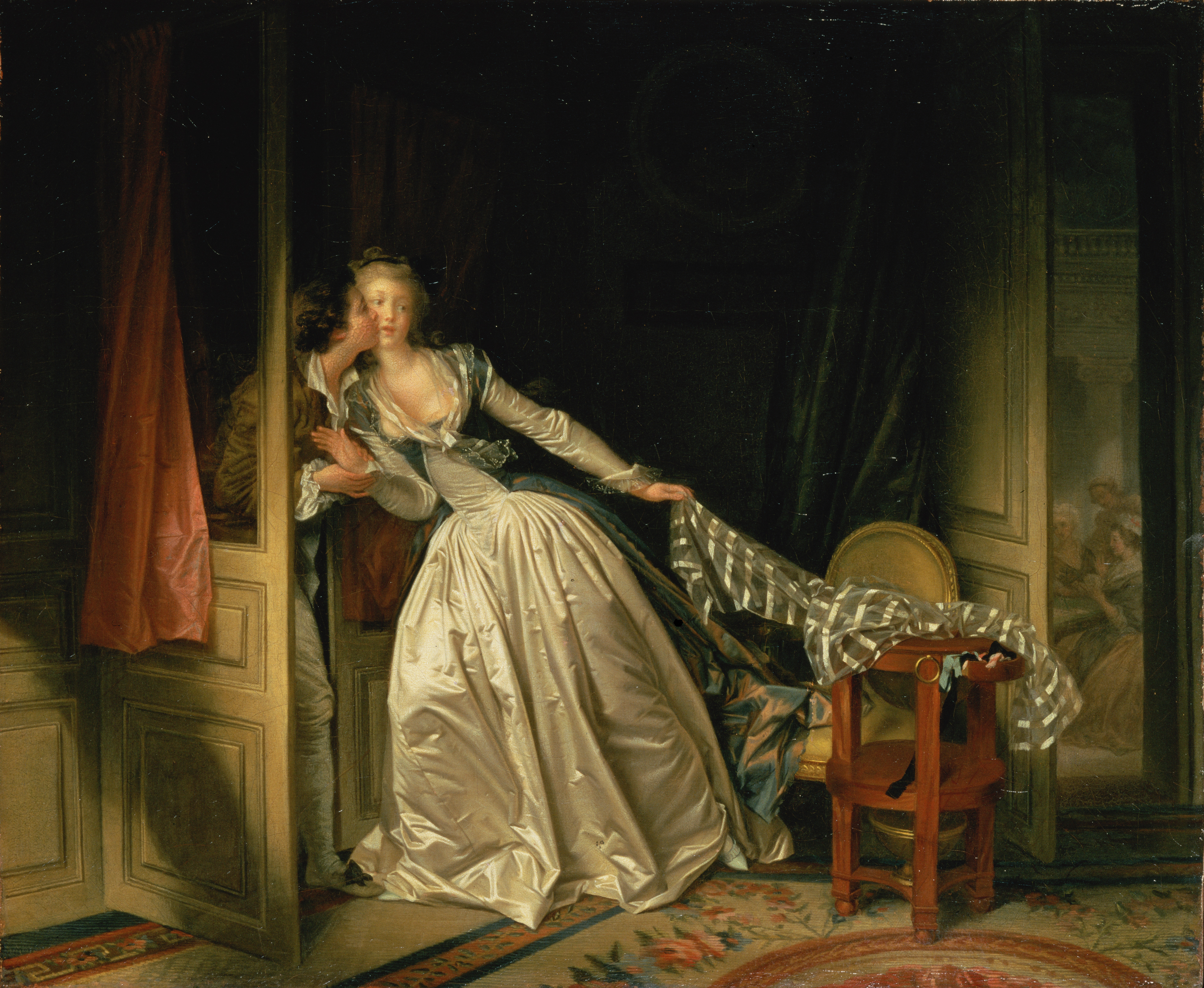
- Artist: Jean-Honoré Fragonard and Marguerite Gérard
- Year: 1787
- Catalogue: GW 523; C 383
- Medium: Oil on canvas
- Dimensions: 45 cm × 55 cm (18 in × 22 in)
- Location: Hermitage Museum; Saint Petersburg

The Stolen Kiss is an oil painting on canvas executed in 1787 and located in the Hermitage Museum, Saint Petersburg. It has been historically attributed to the French Rococo artist Jean-Honoré Fragonard (1732–1806). At 45 by 55 centimetres (18 in × 22 in), the painting is a genre scene influenced by Dutch Golden Age painting, depicting a young couple in a secretive romance, set in the foreground – a subject that was favoured before the French Revolution among French aristocrats.

In the late 18th century, The Stolen Kiss belonged to Stanisław August Poniatowski, the last monarch of the Polish–Lithuanian Commonwealth, and was hosted in the Lazienki Palace in Warsaw. With the acquisition of the palace in the early 19th century by Tsar Alexander I, the painting effectively became part of the Russian imperial collections. It was transferred in 1895 to the Hermitage Museum, where it remains.

The traditional attribution of The Stolen Kiss to Fragonard is based on a mention of him as the author, with an etching of the painting published in 1788. However, it has been noted that the style of the painting, though close to Fragonard's works such as The Bolt, is more characteristic of the artist's sister-in-law and apprentice, Marguerite Gérard; because of that, some scholars consider the painting to be either a collaboration by Gérard and Fragonard, or solely by Gérard.

== History ==
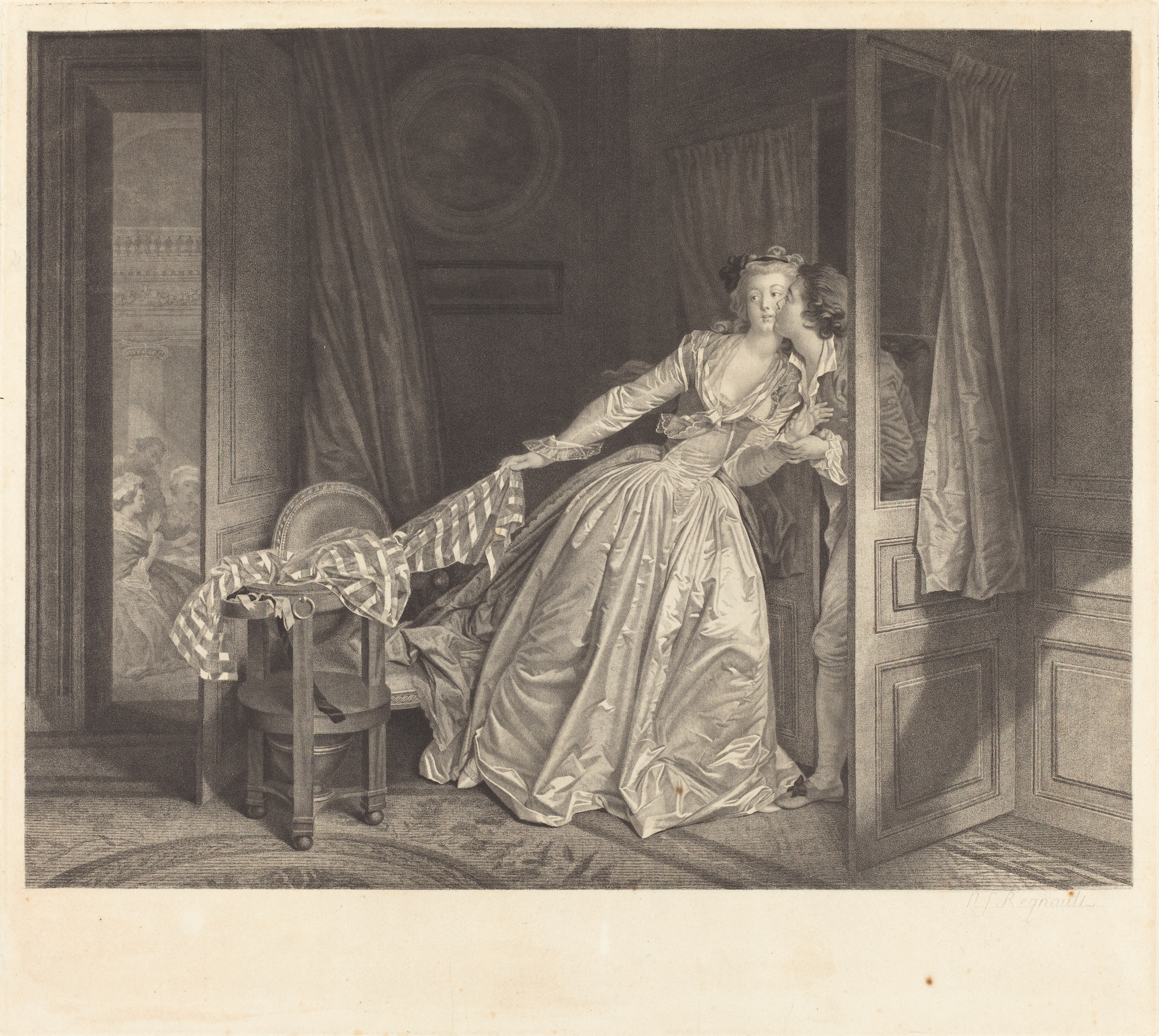
Nicolas François Regnault after Fragonard, The Stolen Kiss, etching, 1788

The earliest dated mention of The Stolen Kiss comes from the June 1788 issue of the Mercure de France magazine, where an engraving by Nicolas François Regnault of Fragonard's painting was advertised as a pendant to The Bolt.

Shortly later in the 1790s, the work was purchased by Stanisław August Poniatowski, the last monarch of the first Rzeczpospolita; it was present in the catalogue of the Royal Picture Gallery at the Lazienki Palace in Warsaw in 1795. Perhaps it was bought at one of the auctions, which sold goods of the French aristocracy following the Revolution of 1789. This would explain the silence of the sources about the acquisition of the work and its certain formal and thematic incompatibility with the other works of the collection. Poniatowski highly valued The Stolen Kiss, and was willing to have it taken from Warsaw to Saint Petersburg upon his abdication in 1795; the shipment did not take place, though.

After Poniatowski's death in 1798, his collection at the Lazienki Palace was formally succeeded by the nephew, Józef Poniatowski, and later by the latter's sister Maria Teresa, who sold the palace in 1817 to Tsar Alexander I, effectively making The Stolen Kiss part of the Russian imperial collection. The painting remained in the Lazienki Palace until 1895, when it was transferred to the Hermitage following a report from the imperial collection curator Andrei Somov, who recommended The Stolen Kiss, with four other paintings from Stanisław August's collection, to be present in the Hermitage on conservation and accessibility concerns.

After regaining independence in 1918 first, the Polish government made diplomatic efforts to recover the painting. In the light of international law and arrangements with the authorities of the Soviet Union, the painting was viewed as a national treasure and, therefore, a subject to legal restitution. However, the Soviet authorities refused to release the painting, retaining it in the Hermitage collection, and arbitrarily compensated it (among with several others valuable paintings) with several works of lesser value. In 1922, The Stolen Kiss was specifically compensated with the smaller Polish Woman (now in the National Museum in Warsaw), historically attributed to Jean-Antoine Watteau, originally purchased into the Russian imperial collection in 1772 as part of the Crozat collection.

== Painting ==
The painting depicts a kiss between two lovers, showing a young lady in cream-coloured silk gown who appears to have left her company for a secret meeting with a young man. The composition is diagonal, made up by an axis composed through her leaning figure, the shawl and the balcony door opening from the outside, ending with the table the shawl is draped over. The painting offers an array of compositional contrasts between colours and shadows: the spatial intersections are complex.

Jean-Honoré Fragonard's works display the kind of eroticism and voluptuousness and the liking for romantic folly that was popular before the French Revolution among French aristocrats. Fragonard includes scenes of voyeurism in his paintings. This scene is depicting the stolen kiss in lavish surroundings, containing luxurious details of textures, silks and lace, like the rug with flower pattern, silk draperies, her shawl on the chair, the elegantly clad ladies that are visible through the open door. The dominant French culture influenced how Fragonard chose his themes, that were mostly erotic or love scenes, painted for Louis XV's pleasure-loving court's enjoyment.

== See also ==
- List of works by Fragonard
