= Blindekuh (film) =

1915 film by Ernst Lubitsch

- Directed by: Ernst Lubitsch
- Release date: 1915
- Country: Germany
- Language: Silent

Blindekuh (English: Blind man's mane) is a 1915 German silent comedy film by Ernst Lubitsch. The one-act comedy is one of the director's lost works.

== Plot ==
A woman desperately wants to prevent her daughter from marrying a man she doesn't like. To this end, she gets engaged to her daughter's boyfriend. However, she is outsmarted by the couple, who eventually find a way to be together.

== Production ==
This film was Lubitsch's first directorial work from 1914, but it did not premiere until 1915. The buildings in the film were designed by Kurt Richter. The censors banned Blindekuh for young people in May 1915. The premiere took place on May 28, 1915, at UT Nollendorfplatz, UT Friedrichstraße, UT Kurfürstendamm and UT Alexanderplatz in Berlin.

== Criticism ==
The critics praised Lubitsch's "often proven grotesque acting" and wrote that the film "became very funny thanks to Lubitsch's art". At the same time, however, the film was called “a bit drawn out”, adding that "less would have been more here.”
