= The Swing (Fragonard) =

1767 painting by Jean-Honoré Fragonard

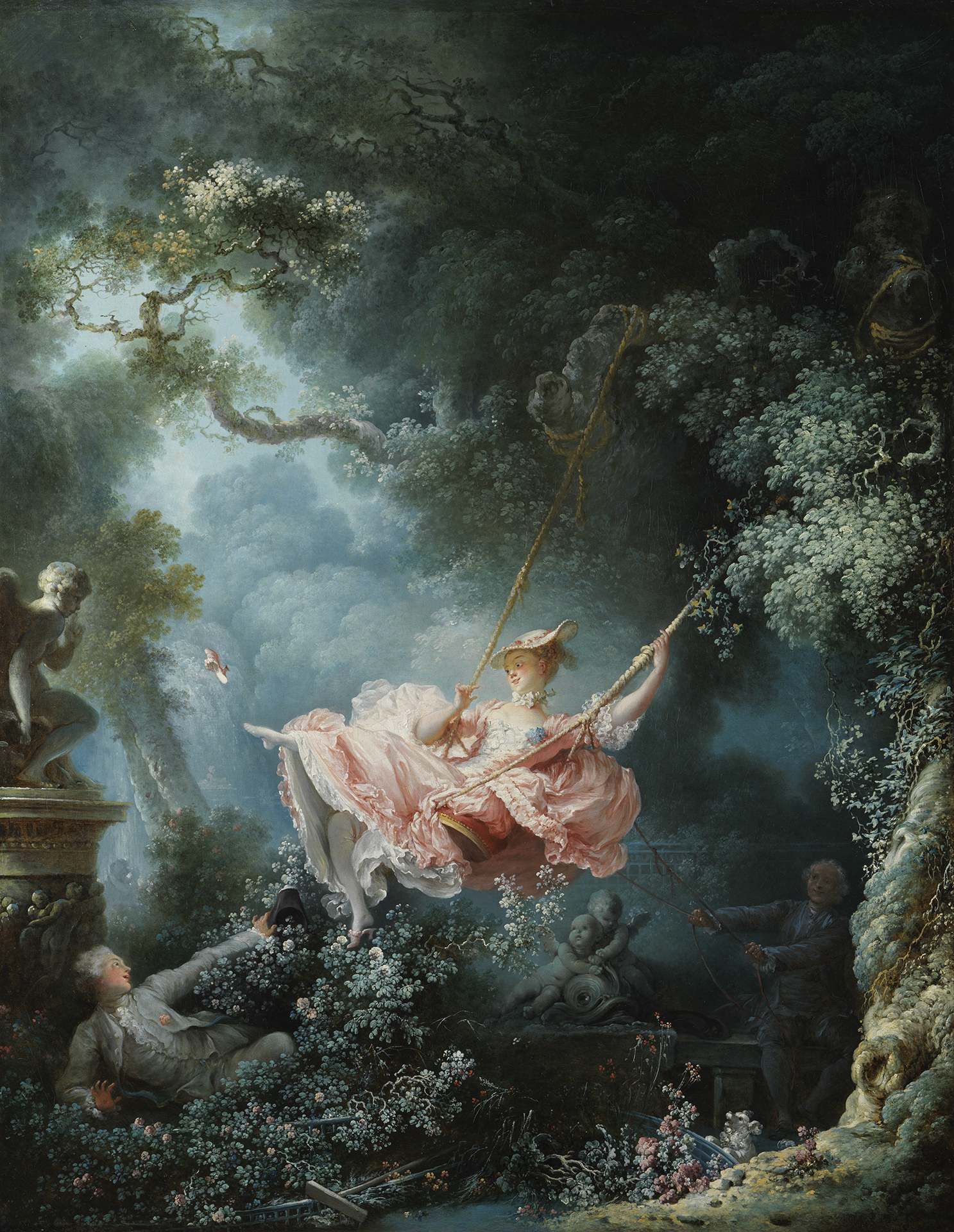
- Artist: Jean-Honoré Fragonard
- Year: About 1767–68
- Medium: Oil on canvas
- Dimensions: 81 cm × 64.2 cm (31 7/8 in × 25 1/4 in)
- Location: The Wallace Collection, London, United Kingdom

The Swing (French: L'Escarpolette), also known as The Happy Accidents of the Swing (French: Les Hasards heureux de l'escarpolette, the original title), is an 18th-century oil painting by Jean-Honoré Fragonard in the Wallace Collection in London. It is considered to be one of the masterpieces of the Rococo era, and is Fragonard's best-known work.

== Description ==
The painting depicts an elegantly dressed young woman on a swing. A smiling young man, hiding in the bushes below and to the left, points towards her billowing dress with hat in hand. A smiling older man, who is nearly hidden in the shadows on the right, propels the swing with a pair of ropes, as a small white dog barks nearby. The lady is wearing a bergère hat (shepherdess hat), as she flings her shoe with an outstretched left foot. Two statues are present, one of a putto, who watches from above the young man on the left with its finger in front of its lips, the other of two putti are on the right beside the older man.

According to the memoirs of the dramatist Charles Collé, a courtier (homme de la cour) first asked Gabriel François Doyen to make this painting of him and his mistress. Not comfortable with this frivolous work, Doyen refused and passed on the commission to Fragonard. The man had requested a portrait of his mistress seated on a swing being pushed by a bishop, but Fragonard painted a layman.

This style of "frivolous" painting soon became the target of the philosophers of the Enlightenment, who demanded a more serious art which would show the nobility of humanity.

== Provenance ==
The original ownership is uncertain. A firm provenance begins only with the tax farmer Marie-François Ménage de Pressigny, who was guillotined in 1794, after which it was seized by the revolutionary government. It was possibly later owned by the Marquis des Razins de Saint-Marc, and certainly by the Duc de Morny. After his death in 1865, it was bought at auction in Paris by Lord Hertford, the main founder of the Wallace Collection.

== Conservation ==
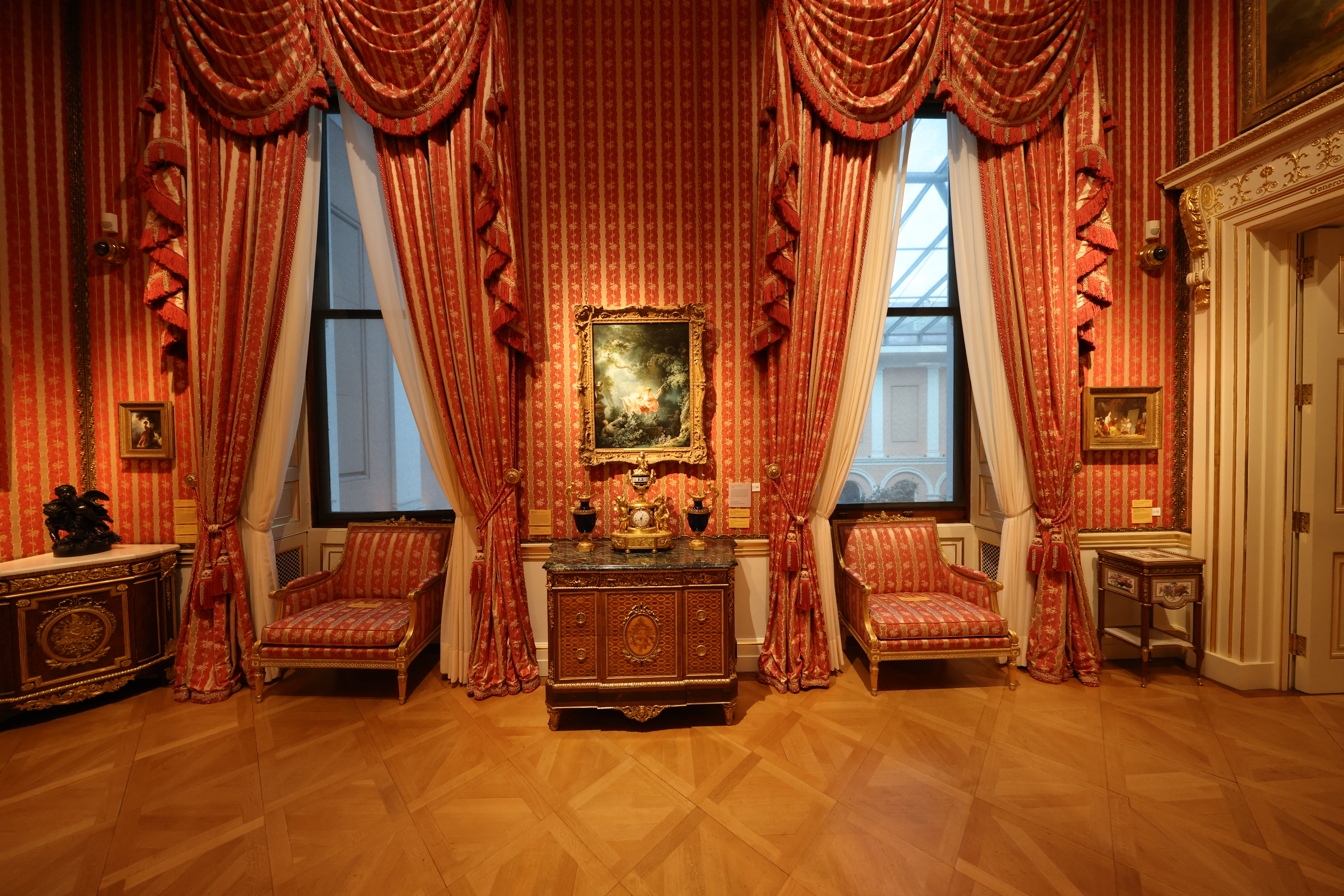
How the painting was displayed in 2025

Between August and November 2021, The Swing underwent sensitive conservation at the Wallace Collection in an effort to reverse the natural aging process, which had diminished the painting's appearance. Because of its importance, the painting is rarely off public display, and it had not been cleaned for over 100 years. As a result, the paint surface had become obscured by severely yellowed varnish, while old retouching had become visible.

== Notable copies ==
There are two notable copies, neither by Fragonard.

- One copy, once owned by Edmond James de Rothschild, portrays the woman in a blue dress.
- The other is a smaller version (56 × 46 cm), owned by Duke Jules de Polignac. This painting became the property of the Grimaldi family in 1930 when Pierre de Polignac (1895-1964) married Princess Charlotte, Duchess of Valentinois (1898-1977). In 1966, the Grimaldi & Labeyrie Collection gave it to the city of Versailles, where it is currently exhibited at the Musée Lambinet, attributed to Fragonard's workshop.

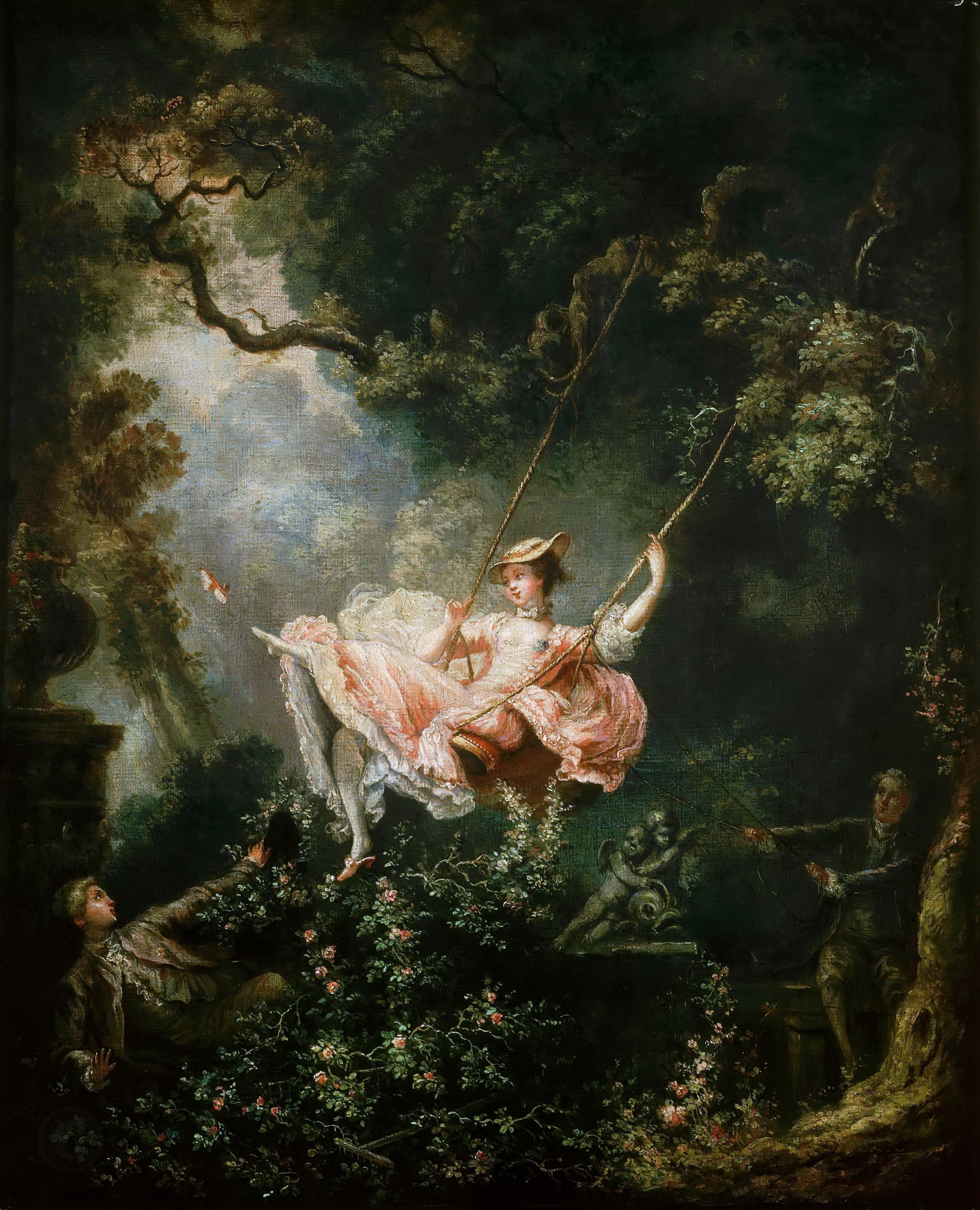
Copy of The Swing from Musée Lambinet, Versailles

== Notable derived works ==
- 1782: Les Hazards Heureux de l'Escarpolettes, etching and engraving by Nicolas de Launay [fr] (1739–1792), 62.3 × 45.5 cm (24 5/8 × 17 7/8 in). Contrary to the original painting, the lady is facing right and has plumes on her hat (among other dissimilarities) because it was drawn after the replica owned by Edmond de Rothschild.
- 1920: The poem "Portrait of a Lady" by William Carlos Williams is believed to reference Fragonard's work and this painting in particular.
- 1972: The Little Feat album Sailin' Shoes features front cover artwork by Neon Park that alludes to Fragonard's work.
- 1999: The first act of the ballet Contact: The Musical by Susan Stroman and John Weidman is described as a "contact improvisation" on the painting.
- 2001: The Swing (after Fragonard) is a headless lifesize recreation of Fragonard's model clothed in African fabric, by Yinka Shonibare
- 2013: The animated Disney film Frozen displays a version of The Swing in a scene when lead character Anna dances through an art gallery singing "For the First Time in Forever." It was previously used as a source of inspiration for the film Tangled with filmmakers even recreating the portrait with an early design of Rapunzel.
- 2022: At the beginning of Red Velvet's "Feel My Rhythm" music video, there is a scene where Irene homages the lady in The Swing and swings.
- 2022: The promotional poster for season three of the HBO Max show Harley Quinn uses a version of The Swing with Harley Quinn and Ivy on the swing while other characters from the show can be seen in the background.

== See also ==
- List of works by Fragonard
