= List of French royal mistresses =

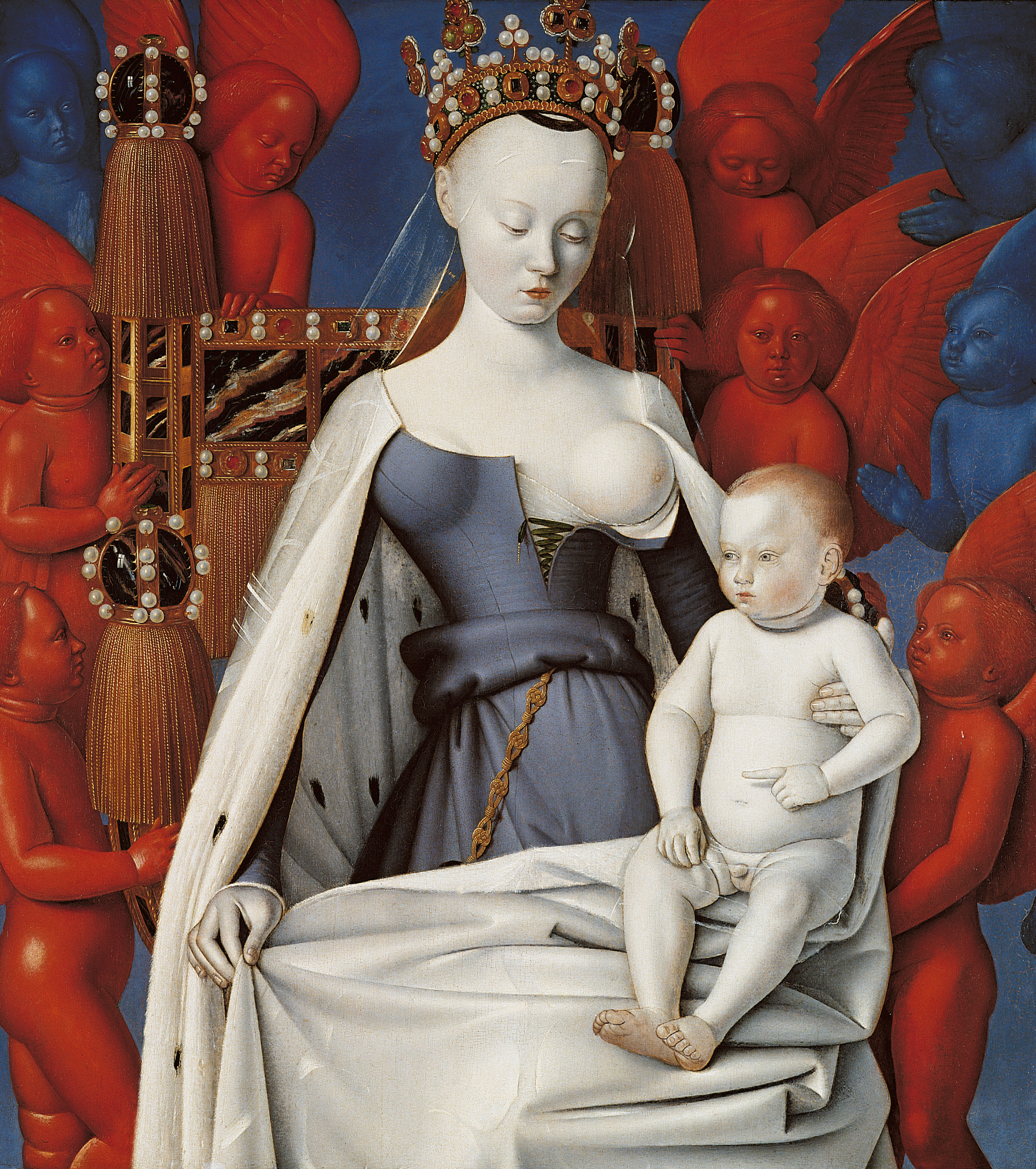
Agnès Sorel

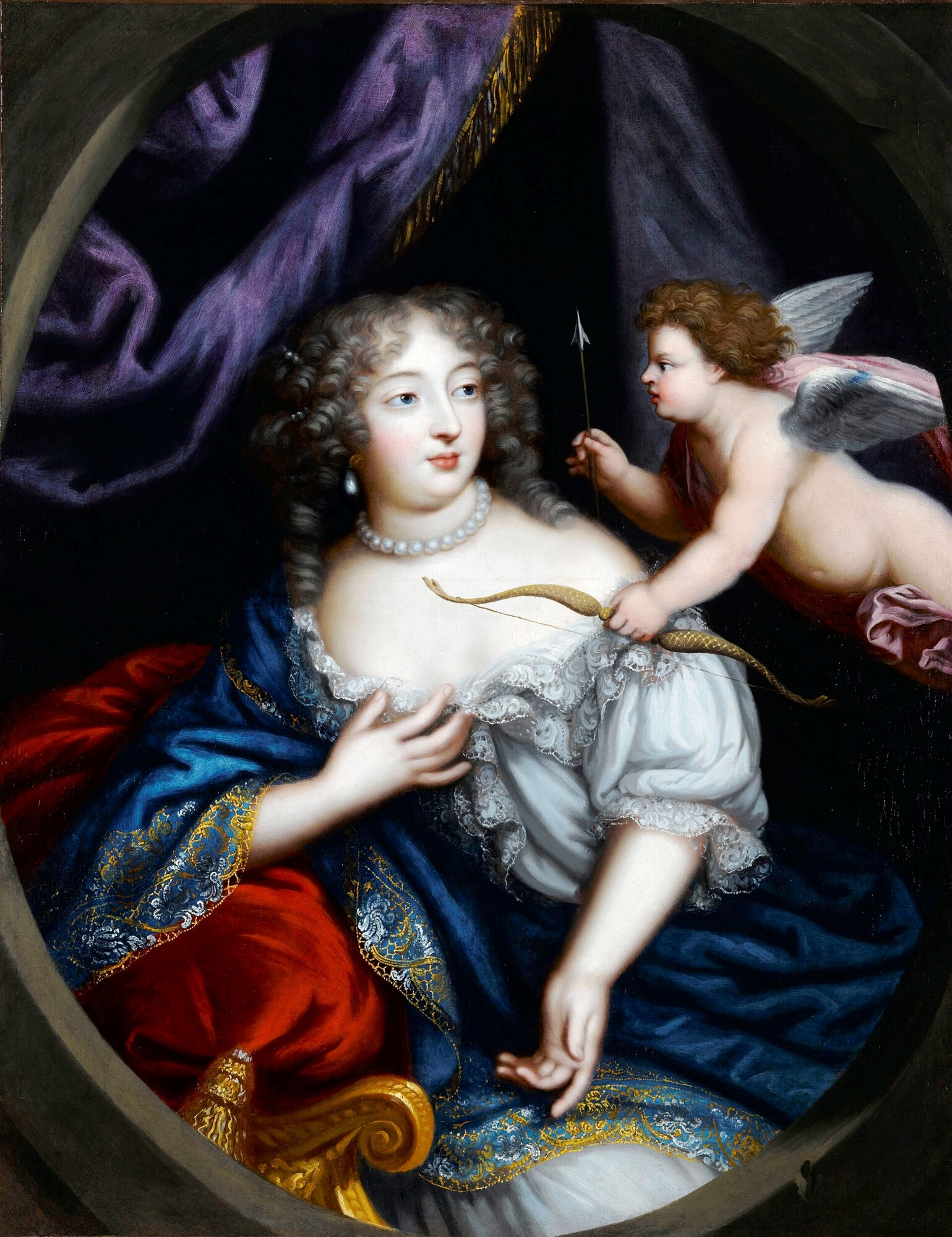
Françoise-Athénaïs, marquise de Montespan

Madame de Pompadour

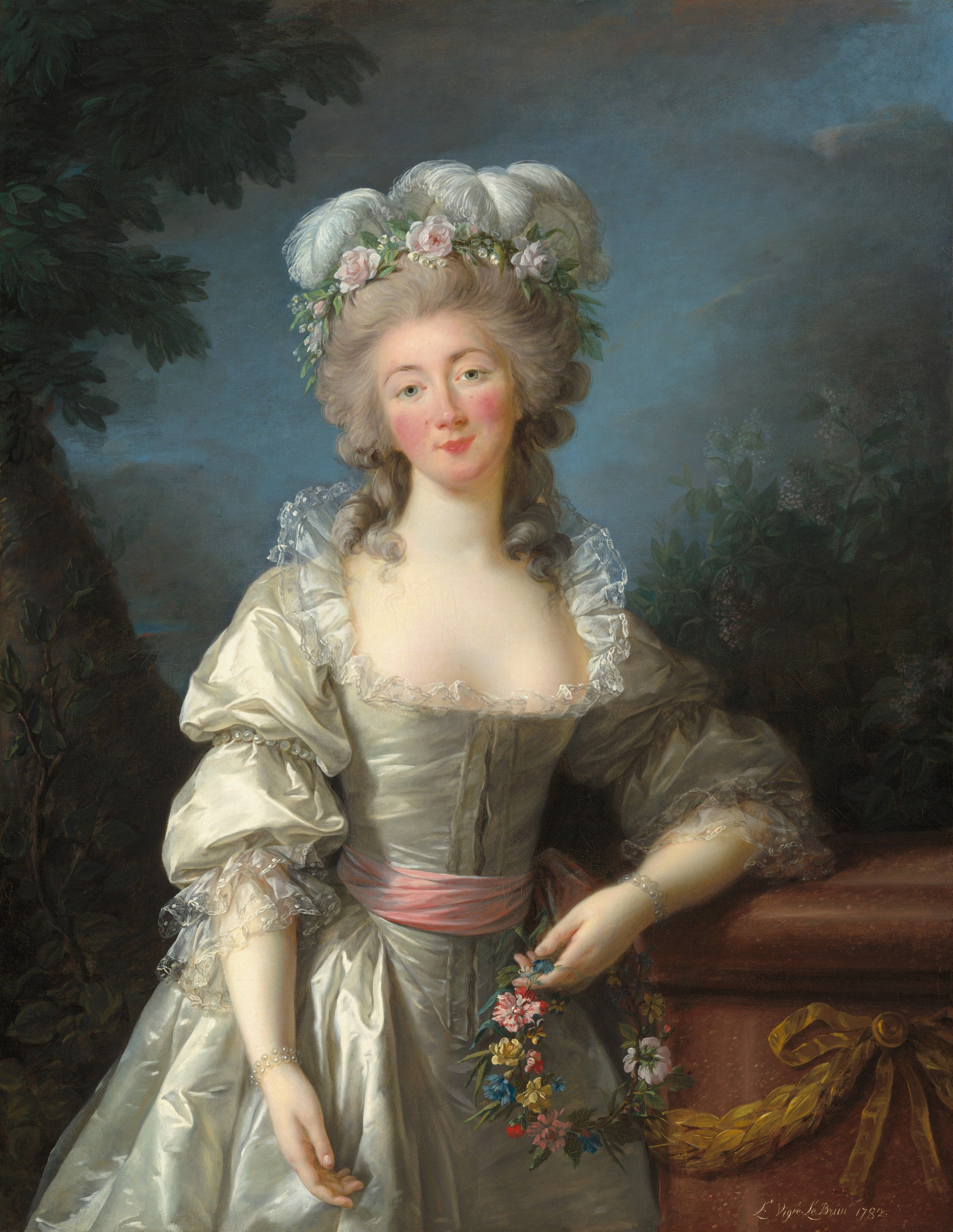
Madame du Barry became a Maîtresse-en-titre despite her "low birth", which was considered scandalous.

This article contains a listing of notable French royal mistresses.

== Chlothar I ==
- Waldrada, Princess of the Lombards
- Arnegundis

== Charibert I ==
- Merofleda
- Clothilde
- Marcovefa
- Theogilda

== Chilperic I ==
- Fredgunde d'Ardennes (d. 597), mistress, then wife

== Dagobert I ==
- Regintrude of Austrasia
- Berthilde

== Charlemagne ==
- Gersuinda of the Saxons
- Amaltrud of Vienne
- Ethelind
- Sigrade
- Madelgard
- Regina
- Landrade des Herbages
- Adelindus

== Louis the Pious ==
- Theodelinde of Sens

== Louis the Stammerer ==
- Luitgrade of Saxony
- Adelheid of Paris

== Charles the Simple ==
- Edgiva of Kent
- Frederuna von Ringleheim

== Philip I ==
- Bertrade de Montfort (c. 1070 – c. 1116): marriage not recognised by the Church

== Louis VI ==
- Marie de Breuillet (c. 1080 – 1119)

== Louis X ==
- Unknown woman, with whom he had a daughter, Eudeline.

== Philip VI ==
- Béatrice de la Berruère (1294–1348)

== Charles V ==
- Biette de Cassinel (c. 1340 – c. 1380) (Note: "Although Biette Cassinel has been attached occasionally to Charles V, no concrete evidence for a relationship exists.") (Note: "..concerning the relations which may have existed between Charles V and the mother[Biette Cassinel] of Jean de Montaigu, are not justified by any proof by any reference..")
- Unknown, mother of Oudard d'Attainville (1360 – ?).

== Charles VI ==
- Odette de Champdivers (c. 1384 – 1424)

== Charles VII ==
- Agnès Sorel (c. 1422 – 1450)
- Antoinette de Maignelais (c. 1430 – c. 1461)

== Louis XI ==
- Félize Régnard (c. 1425 – 1475)
- Marguerite de Sassenage (c. 1424 – 1471)

== Francis I ==
=== Official mistresses (maîtresse-en-titre) ===
- Françoise de Foix (1495–1537), countess of Châteaubriant
- Anne de Pisseleu d'Heilly (1508–1580), duchess of Étampes

=== Unofficial mistresses (petite maîtresse) ===
- Marie Gaudin (1490 or 1495–1580), dame de La Bourdaisière, she was an ancestor of Gabrielle d'Estrées
- La Belle Ferronnière (1500-1530)
- Claude de Rohan-Gyé (1519–1579), countess of Tonnerre and of Thoury
- La Châtelaine de Montfrault
- Jacquette de Lansac (1490–1532)

== Henry II ==
=== Official mistresses (maîtresse-en-titre) ===
- Diane de Poitiers (1499–1566)

=== Unofficial mistresses (petite maîtresse) ===
- Jane Fleming (or Jane Stewart) (c. 1508 – c. 1553)
- Filippa Duci (c. 1520 –?)
- Nicole de Savigny (1535–1590), baroness of Fontette

== Charles IX ==
=== Unofficial mistresses (petite maîtresse) ===
- Marie Touchet (c. 1553 – 1638)

== Henry III ==
=== Unofficial mistresses (petite maîtresse) ===
- Louise de La Béraudière du Rouhet (1530-1611)
- Renée de Rieux de Châteauneuf
- Veronica Franco (1546–1591)
- Marie of Cleves, Princess of Condé (1553-1574)
- Jeanne de Laval, dame de Senneterre (1549–1586)
- Françoise Babou de La Bourdaisière (1542-1592), mother of Gabrielle d'Estrées

== Henry IV ==
This list includes historically recognised and popularly attributed mistresses:

=== Official mistresses (maîtresse-en-titre) ===
- Gabrielle d'Estrées (c. 1571–1599), mistress 1591–1599
- Catherine Henriette de Balzac d'Entragues (1579–1633), marquise of Verneuil, mistress 1599–1609

=== Unofficial mistresses (petite maîtresse) ===
- Fleurette de Nérac, vers 1571–1572, fille d’un jardinier de Nérac
- Charlotte de Sauve (c. 1551–1617), mistress in 1572.
- Bretine de Duras, mistress 1573–1574
- Louise de la Béraudière, called « La belle Rouet », mistress in 1575, maid of honour of Queen Margaret
- Louise Borré, mistress 1575–1576, daughter of a royal notary. She gave him a son, Hervé (1576–1643)
- Jeanne de Tignonville, mistress 1577–1578
- Victoire de Ayala, mistress in 1578, maid of honour of Catherine de' Medici
- Mlle Rebours, mistress in 1579, maid of honour of Queen Margaret
- Mlle de Montagu, mistress in 1579
- Mme d’Allous, mistress in 1579
- Aimée Le Grand, mistress in 1579
- Arnaudine, mistress in 1579
- La garce de Goliath », mistress in 1579
- Catherine de Luc, mistress in 1579. She died of hunger when Henry abandoned her, leaving behind their child.
- Anne de Cambefort, mistress in 1579. She committed suicide by jumping out of a window after Henry left her
- Françoise de Montmorency (1566–6 December 1641), mistress 1579–1581, maid of honour of Queen Margaret. She had one stillborn daughter with the king in 1581.
- Diane d'Andouins, called « la belle Corisande » (c. 1554 – c. 1584)
- Esther Imbert (or Ysambert), mistress 1587–1588. She had two sons with Henry.
- Martine, rochelaise, en 1587. She had one child with Henry.
- Antoinette de Pons (1570–1632), marquess of Guercheville
- Catherine de Verdun
- Mme Quelin, mistress in 1598
- Isabelle Potier, mistress 1598–1599
- Mlle Clein, mistress in 1599
- La Glandée, mistress in 1599
- Marie-Françoise de La Bourdaisière, sister of Gabrielle d’Estrées, mistress in 1599
- Jacqueline de Bueil (c. 1580–1651)
- Charlotte des Essarts (c. 1580–1651), mistress 1607–1609
- Angélique Paulet, mistress in 1610

== Louis XIV ==
=== Official mistresses (maîtresse-en-titre) ===
- 1661–1667: Louise de La Vallière (1644–1710), duchess of Vaujours
- 1667–1681: Françoise-Athénaïs de Rochechouart de Mortemart (1640–1707), marquise of Montespan
- 1678–1681: Marie Angélique de Scoraille de Roussille (1661–1681), duchess of Fontanges
- 1683–1715: Françoise d'Aubigné (1635–1719), marquise of Maintenon. Not really a mistress but a secret morganatic wife

=== Unofficial mistresses (petite maîtresse) ===
- Catherine Bellier (1614–1689) baroness of Beauvais, between 1652–1654
- Olympe Mancini (1638–1708) in 1654–1657 and 1660-1661
- Anne-Madeleine de Conty d'Argencourt in 1658
- Marie Mancini (1639–1715) in 1658–1659; not a mistress but a platonic love
- Name unknown: a gardener's daughter who gave birth to a daughter in 1660
- Henrietta Anne of England (1644–1670) his sister-in-law, probably platonic, in 1660–1661
- Bonne de Pons d'Heudicourt (1641–1709) in 1665
- Catherine-Charlotte de Gramont (1639–1678) princess of Monaco in 1665
- Gabrielle de Rochechouart de Mortemart (1633–1693), marquise of Thianges; sister of madame de Montespan
- Anne de Rohan-Chabot (1648–1709), princess of Soubise, on-and-off in 1669–1675
- Claude de Vin des Œillets (c. 1637 – 1687) in 1670–1676
- Diane-Gabrielle de Damas de Thianges (1656-1715) in 1670–1673; daughter of madame de Thianges and niece of madame de Montespan
- Lydie de Rochefort-Théobon (1638-1708) in 1673–1677
- Isabelle de Ludres (1647–1722) in 1675–1678
- Marie-Charlotte de Castelnau, comtesse de Louvigny et duchesse de Gramont (c. 1648 – 1694) in 1676–1677
- Marie-Madeleine Agnès de Gontaut Biron, marquise de Nogaret (1653–1724) in 1680–1683
- Louise-Elisabeth de Rouxel dite Mme de Grancey (1653–1711) in 1681
- Jeanne de Rouvroy, marquise de Chevrières (1650–1689) in 1681
- Françoise Thérèse de Voyer de Dorée, Mlle d’Oré, in 1681
- Marie-Antoinette de Rouvroy, comtesse d’Oisy (1660–1721) in 1681
- Marie-Rosalie de Piennes, future marquise de Châtillon (1665–1735) in 1681
- Mme de Saint-Martin in 1682
- Marie-Louise de Montmorency-Laval, duchesse de Roquelaure (1657–1735) in 1683
- Julie de Guenami, dite Mlle de Châteaubriant (1668–1710) in 1683 (possibly only a rumour)

== Louis XV ==
=== Official mistresses (maîtresse-en-titre) ===
- 1732–1742: Louise Julie, Comtesse de Mailly
- 1739–1741: Pauline-Félicité de Mailly
- 1742–1745: Diane-Adélaïde de Mailly
- 1742–1744: Marie Anne de Mailly-Nesle
- 1745–1764: Madame de Pompadour
- 1769–1774: Madame du Barry

=== Unofficial mistresses (petite maîtresse) ===
After 1755, unofficial lovers of the king who did not belong to the nobility were often kept at the Parc-aux-Cerfs.

- 1738: NN, a butcher's daughter in Versailles
- 1738: Thérèse-Eulalie de Beaupoil de Saint-Aulaire (1705–1739), marquise de Beuvron
- 1738: Marie-Anne de Vougny (1716–1783) Madame Amelot
- 1748: Anne-Marie de Montmorency-Luxembourg (1729–1760), princesse de Robecq.
- 1748: Marie-Anne-Françoise de Noailles, comtesse de La Marck (1719–1793).
- 1749: Elisabeth-Charlotte Huguet de Sémonville (1715–1784), comtesse d'Estrades.
- 1749: Marie-Françoise de Carbonnel de Canisy (1725–1796), marquise d’Antin puis comtesse de Forcalquier.
- 1750: Alexandrine Sublet d'Heudicourt, (1721–1800) marquise de Belsunce.
- 1750: Françoise de Chalus, duchesse de Narbonne-Lara, première femme de chambre de la duchesse de Parme (1734–1821).
- 1750–1750: Irène du Buisson de Longpré (d. 1767)
- 1750–1751: Marie Geneviève Radix de Sainte-Foy (1729–1809)
- 1752: Mlle Trusson, femme de chambre de la dauphine Marie-Josèphe de Saxe.
- 1752: Jeanne-Marguerite de Niquet (fl. 1732–1795) dite Mlle de Niquet.
- 1752: Mlle de Saint-André
- 1752–1755: Thérèse Guerbois
- 1752–1752: Charlotte Rosalie de Choiseul-Beaupré (1733–1753)
- 1752–1754: Marie-Louise O'Murphy (1737–1815)
- 1755–1755: Françoise de Chalus (1734–1821), duchess of Narbonne-Lara
- 1755–1757: Brigitte O'Murphy (1729–1793)
- 1755: Mlle Fouquet, daughter of a hairdresser
- 1755: Mlle Robert
- 1755–1759: Mlle David
- 1755–1759: Mlle Armory, « Mimi», daughter of a ballet dancer
- 1756: Gabrielle-Charlotte Françoise d‘Hénin-Liétard (1729–1809), vicomtesse de Cambis, née princesse de Chimay
- 1756: Dorothée, daughter of a water carrier in Strasbourg.
- 1756: Mlle Selin
- 1757–1757: Marie Anne de Coislin (1732–1817)
- 1758: Marie-Louise de Marny (fl. 1737 – fl. 1793), Madame de Giambone
- 1759: Marie-Madeleine Couppier de Romans, Madame Varnier
- 1759–1762: Marguerite-Catherine Haynault (1736–1823), marquise of Montmelas
- 1760–1763: Lucie Madeleine d'Estaing (1743–1826)
- 1760–1765: Anne Couppier de Romans (1737–1808), baroness of Meilly-Coulonge
- 1762–1765: Louise-Jeanne Tiercelin de La Colleterie (1746–1779), called Madame de Bonneval
- 1763–1765: Anne Thoinard de Jouy (1739–1825)
- 1763: Marie-Françoise-Marguerite de Talleyrand-Périgord (1727–1775), comtesse de Périgord
- 1764: Béatrix de Choiseul-Stainville, duchesse de Gramont (1730–1794)
- 1764: Louise Jeanne Marie de Courtarvel de Pezé (1733–1789), marquise de Dreux-Brézé
- 1763–1765: Anne Thoynard de Jouy, comtesse d’Esparbès de Lussan (1739–1825)
- 1765: Marie-Adélaïde de Bullioud (1743–1793), comtesse de Séran
- 1768–1768: Catherine Éléonore Bénard (1740–1769)
- 1768–1768: Marie Thérèse Françoise Boisselet (1731–1800)
- 1768: Jeanne-Marguerite Salvetat (1748–1838), actress
- 1771: "demoiselle de Smith"
- 1771: Madame Bèche, wife of a musician of the royal chapel
- 1771: Françoise-Marie-Antoinette de Saucerotte (1756–1815), Mademoiselle Raucourt, actress
- 1772: Madame d’Amerval
- 1773: Rose-Marie-Hélène de Tournon (1757–1782), vicomtesse du Barry
- 1774–1774: Albertine-Elisabeth Pater (1742–1817)
- Date unknown: Marthe-Antoinette Aubry de Vatan (1720 – after 1777)
- Date unknown: Mme de Grandis, Mme de Martinville, Mlle de Ville, courtesan
- Date unknown: Mme de Beaunier, Mlle de Malignan, Mme de Salis

== Napoleon I ==
- 1806–1808: Eléonore Denuelle
- 1809–1810: Marie Walewska

== Louis XVIII ==
=== Official mistresses (maîtresse-en-titre) ===
- Zoé Victoire Talon, comtesse du Cayla (1785-1852)

=== Unofficial mistresses (petite maîtresse) ===
- 1780–1791: Anne Jacobée Nompar

== Charles X ==
- Rosalie Duthé (1748-1830); equally mistress of Philippe Égalité
- Louise d'Esparbès de Lussan (1764-1804)
- Aglaé de Polignac (1768-1803)

== Napoleon III ==
- 1856–1857: Virginia Oldoini, Countess of Castiglione
- 1857–1861: Marie-Anne Walewska
- 1863–1870: Marguerite Bellanger

== See also ==
- Maîtresse-en-titre

== Sources ==
- Adams, Tracy; Adams, Christine (2020). The Creation of the French Royal Mistress: From Agnès Sorel to Madame Du Barry. The Pennsylvania State University Press.
- Delachenal, Roland (1909). Histoire de Charles V. Vol. I. Picard.
- Gaude-Ferragu, Murielle (2016). Queenship in Medieval France, 1300-1500. Translated by Krieger, Angela. Palgrave Macmillan.
- Kendall, Paul Murray (1971). Louis XI: The Universal Spider. Compton Printing Ltd.
- Knecht, Robert J. (2016). Hero or Tyrant? Henry III, King of France, 1574-89. Routledge.
- Nicolle, David (2004). Poitiers 1356:The Capture of a King. Osprey.
- Wellman, Kathleen (2013). Queens and Mistresses of Renaissance France. Yale University Press.
