= Sartine =

Sartine may refer to:

- Antoine Sartine (1681–1784), French-born financier and Spanish administrator
- Antoine de Sartine (1729–1801), French statesman
- HMS Sartine, French merchant vessel captured by the British
- Sartine Island, one of the Scott Islands of the northwestern point of Vancouver Island, British Columbia

== See also ==
- Sardine (disambiguation)
