= Jean-Charles-Pierre Lenoir =

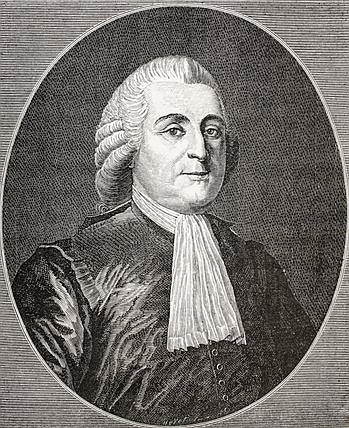

Lieutenant general of police Paris Police Prefecture
- In office 24 August 1774 – 14 May 1775
- Preceded by: Antoine de Sartine
- Succeeded by: Joseph d'Albert

Lieutenant general of police Paris Police Prefecture
- In office 19 June 1776 – 31 July 1785
- Preceded by: Joseph d'Albert
- Succeeded by: Louis Thiroux de Crosne

Personal details
- Born: 10 December 1732 Paris, France
- Died: 17 November 1807 (aged 74) Crosne, Essonne, France

Jean Charles Pierre Lenoir (10 December 1732 – 17 November 1807) was a French lawyer who headed the Paris police in the period immediately before the French Revolution of 1789–99. He had broad responsibility for maintaining public order, reducing dirt and disease and ensuring that the population received adequate supplies of food. He introduced many reforms into the administration of the city.

== Early years ==
Jean Charles Pierre Lenoir was born on 10 December 1732 in Paris. His family had made its fortune under Louis XIV in the silk trade, then moved into the Paris robe. His father was a lieutenant particulier in the Châtelet. Lenoir studied at the Collège Louis-le-Grand and the Faculty of Law of the University of Paris. He then became a traditional servant of the king. Like other senior administrators, he believed in enlightened despotism following the rational and reformist principles of the Encyclopédistes.

Lenoir entered the Châtelet and was promoted through the three grades. He was appointed adviser to the Châtelet in 1752, became a special lieutenant in 1754 and criminal lieutenant in 1759. In 1765 he was appointed maître des requêtes. He served in Rennes on the royal commission that investigated the Chalotais affair. He implemented the Maupeou reforms in Aix-en-Provence. When Louis XVI came to the throne Lenoir succeeded Anne Robert Jacques Turgot as intendent at Limoges.

== First term as head of Paris police ==
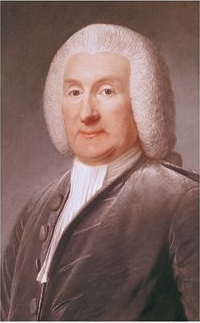
Antoine de Sartine, Lenoir's protector

Before taking up his post in Limoges Lenoir was appointed lieutenant-général de police through the influence of Antoine de Sartine, who had been promoted from this post to become Minister of the Navy. Lenoir took office on 30 August 1774. He objected when Turgot as controller general announced that the extremely liberal grain policies of the 1760s were to be restored without consulting Lenoir. In the spring of 1775 the disorders called the Flour War spread through the heart of France. Lenoir fell into disgrace and was dismissed by Turgot in May 1775 when the riots in Paris spread out of control.

== Second term as head of Paris police ==
Turgot was dismissed in 1776. Lenoir was reinstalled as lieutenant general of the police on 19 June 1776. His mandate was to maintain moral order. His police secured property and public places, monitored authors and their publications, and enforced physical and moral values on the poor. They also distributed bread and grain, regulated guilds and manufactures, supervised royal funding of charities and were responsible for health and sanitation. While maintaining order in Paris, Lenoir had to adapt to the constantly shifting policies and balance of power in the court of Versailles. He remained loyal to his two protectors, Sartine and Jean-Frédéric Phélypeaux, Count of Maurepas, and drew the hostility of their enemies such as Turgot and Necker.

=== Intelligence ===
The Paris police force was the largest in Europe, with one member for every 545 inhabitants of the city, as well as 340 spies. A stock saying in Paris at the time was that when two people had a conversation, another was listening. Lenoir helped the Foreign Minister, Charles Gravier, comte de Vergennes, monitor the opinion of the public and of his political enemies. (Vergennes was not always a reliable friend, and did not support Lenoir during his later conflict with Breteuil.) The salons of Paris provided a way by which the elite could generally avoid censorship and talk freely, although the police monitored them and could lay charges for distribution of unauthorized publications or subversive talk. Under Lenoir the police set up their own salon. Lenoir claimed that he gained more useful information from this salon than from all his inspectors and other contacts. He wrote that his salonnière,

entertained in her own home, several times a week, courtiers, men of letters, socialites, and these idle persons one sees everywhere and who meddle in everything. She served, on days she entertained, a tea the cost of which the police paid. Her house, where persons of all conditions and of good and bad company gathered, was not regarded as completely open: only a few women attended; there were no games; people spoke there with complete freedom.

Lenoir was head of the Paris police at the same time that Benjamin Franklin arrived in Paris in 1776 to advocate for the cause of American independence. Lenoir gathered information on American correspondence, for example via mail interception, and followed British personnel that were also interested in the American cause. No British diplomat was more closely tracked than the British ambassador, Stormont, whose informants were informed upon to Lenoir.

=== Food supplies ===
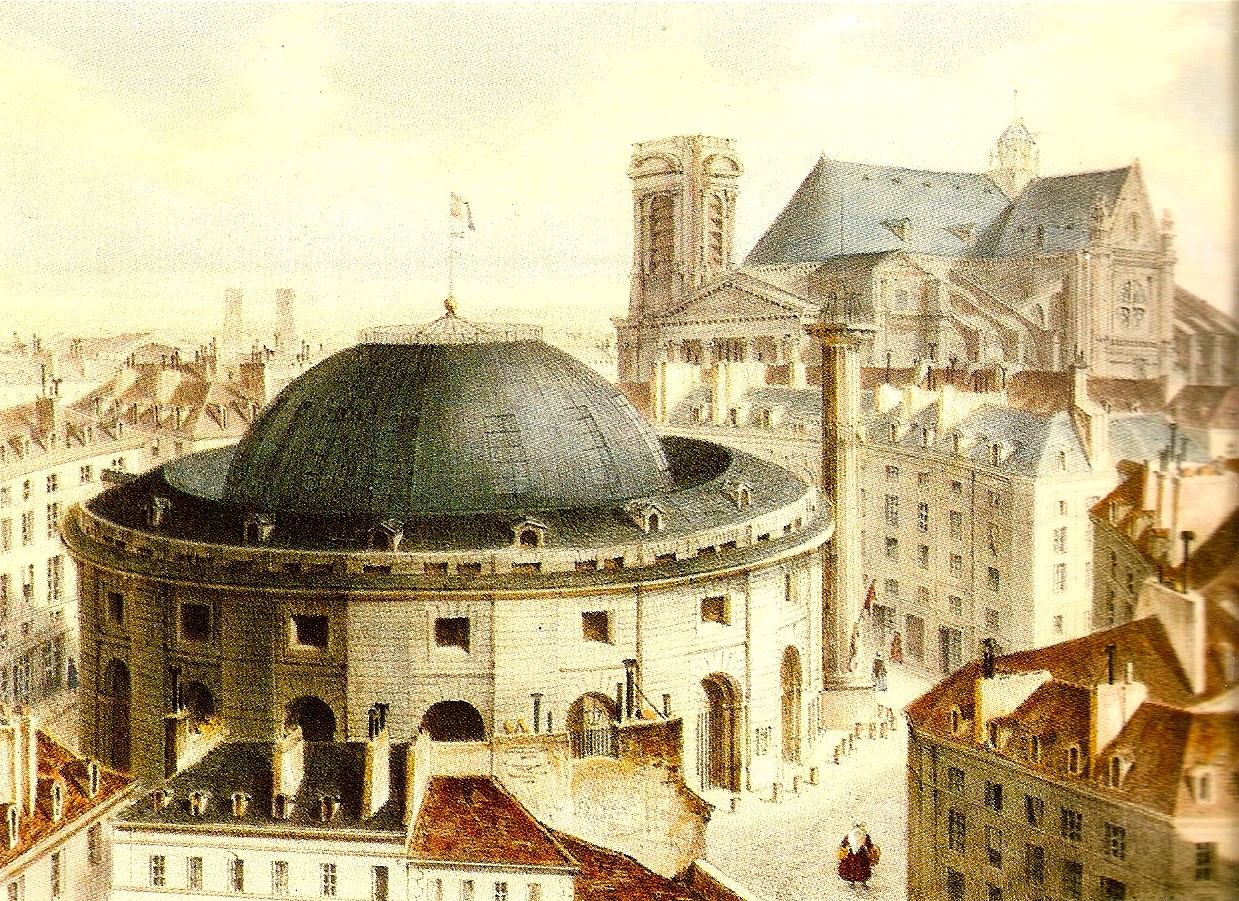
The Halle aux blés, built under Lenoir's administration

Lenoir considered that Turgot's instructions to maintain security yet "not to meddle with bread" had been contradictory. After returning to office Lenoir instituted a more flexible form of price control to be used only when he felt the market had failed to set reasonable prices. In his view the bakers should be able to profit in good times in exchange for accepting some losses when times were hard. He instituted regular checks on prices and encouraged citizens to complain of excess prices. He was a friend of Charles Alexandre de Calonne, Controller General of Finance, who consulted him on matters related to provisioning the city and its financial administration.

Under Lenoir's administration the halls and markets for provisions were well-run. A free school of bakery was established in 1782 after much discussion between Lenoir and Jacques Necker, the banker and finance minister, in which scientific theory and practice were to be combined. The purpose was to research all aspects of bread manufacture and disseminate the findings throughout France. The Halle aux blés (corn exchange) was completed with a dome on 11 September 1783. The interior of the dome was decorated with medallion portraits of Louis XVI, Lenoir and Philibert Delorme, inventor of the technique used to make the dome. (Note: The medallions of the king and Lenoir in the Halle aux blés were destroyed in 1791.)

=== Health ===
As well as being responsible for maintaining civil order, Lenoir was concerned with reducing dirt and disease. Public health was considered a police responsibility. Lenoir was chief administrator of the Hôpital Général of Paris, and the driving force behind the "new hospitals" where the aim was to help the patient recover, as opposed to the traditional hospitals of the religious orders where the aim was to save the patient's soul. However, he ensured that the statutes for hospitals included a statement that, "There is to be strict attention to morals, hours of prayer, and divine office; before childbirth all women must take the sacraments." In 1780 Lenoir found a free hospital for children who had been born with venereal disease. Infected women and children were to be treated at the Hôpital de Vaugirard at the expense of the municipal government.

Lenoir subsidized a competition for the best memoir on the treatment of rabies. On 30 June 1777 Lenoir presided over the formal installation of the College of Pharmacy, whose regulations he had prepared. The college had influence beyond Paris, since it could receive masters for provincial towns that did not have an association of apothecaries or college of medicine. Lenoir appointed the first provosts to inspect the places where medicines were compounded. In 1780 Lenoir made the pharmacist Antoine-Alexis Cadet de Vaux the "salubrity inspector" of Paris. Cadet de Vaux used muriatic acids, combustion of smoke, efficient ventilation and other innovative methods to disinfect insanitary workshops and public places.

=== Other measures ===
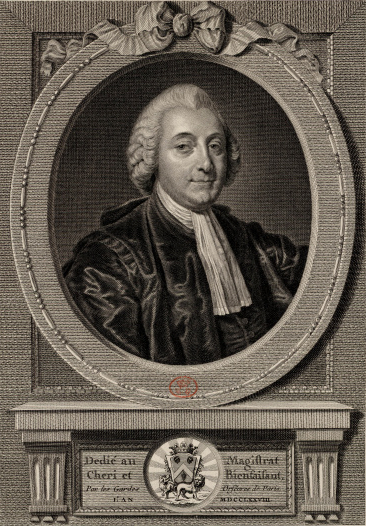
Portrait of Lenoir engraved by Juste Chevillet after a painting by Jean-Baptiste Greuze

Lenoir ensured that many improvements were made to security, lighting, fire control and public assistance in the city He founded the Mont-de-Piété pawnbroking institution and took measures against begging, gambling and prostitution. Lenoir's appointment resulted in a slackening in the enforcement of restrictions against public entertainment. Lenoir had a more tolerant attitude toward the theaters on the boulevard and at the fairs, since he regarded them as a necessary and comparatively innocuous amusement for the continually increasing working-class population of the capital. In fact, it became a requirement for the entrepreneurs of the boulevard to maintain their fairground operations, otherwise the crowds at the fairs would significantly decrease.

Prostitution was widespread and practiced openly in Paris. In 1778 Lenoir published an Ordonnance that imposed harsher fines on women who solicited and those who rented rooms to prostitutes. It was hoped that the result would be greater registration and control of prostitutes working in licensed brothels. The Ordonnance was not effective and clandestine arrangements continued to be widespread. The police employed spies to discover them. The police made much use of prostitutes in brothels as informants. Mercier's Tableau de Paris describes the squalid conditions and says, "Yes, there are beings lower than these women on ill repute, and these beings are men of the police."

In 1777 Lenoir created the Bureau de la filature (Spinning Office) near the Porte Saint-Denis, in an area where cloth was manufactured. The purpose was "improving the quality of the workers' spun thread, finding outlets for the thread, supervising the choice of workers in order to employ those capable of carrying out other types of work. Lenoir appointed the administrators and chaired their meetings. The bureau was subsidized by the crown. In the winter of 1783–84 Lenoir increased the subsidy. Of the 20,000 Parisians assisted by the government at this time, 7,000–8,000 were women employed by the Bureau. It was described as a charity of the king, but it was also seen as a way to prevent idleness and social disturbances due to extreme poverty. It also let manufacturers bypass the guilds and experiment with new techniques.

After 1737 the only place in Paris where French Protestants could be buried was a wood yard on the river bank beside the Faubourg Saint-Antoine. In 1777 Lenoir accepted a suggestion from the Dutch ambassador and allowed the burial of French Protestants in the courtyard of the cemetery for foreign Protestants. The first public Protestant funeral was held in Paris that year without causing any disturbances.

== Later years ==
Lenoir left his post with the Paris police in August 1785, apparently due to a disagreement with Baron Louis Auguste Le Tonnelier de Breteuil, Minister of the Royal Household. He became a conseiller ordinaire in the Council of State. He was appointed king's librarian in 1785 and chairman of the Finance Commission in 1787. Lenoir went into exile in 1792 after the outbreak of the French Revolution, and lived in Switzerland and then for a long time in Vienna. He returned to France after the Consulate took power and retired to the countryside near Paris on a pension from the Mont-de-Piété. Lenoir worked on a treatise that would defend his actions against the revolutionaries, and those of other police officials since 1667. He began writing in 1790, and seems to have worked on it intermittently for the remainder of his life. His memoir remained unfinished when he died. It provides a valuable insight into the revolution as seen by an enlightened supporter of the Ancien Régime institutions.

Jean Lenoir died on 17 November 1807 in Crosne, in what is now the department of Essonne, aged 74.

== Publications ==
- Lenoir, Jean-Charles-Pierre (1780). Détail sur quelques établissemens de la ville de Paris, demandé par sa majesté impériale, la reine de Hongrie. Paris. p. 65.
- Lenoir, Jean-Charles-Pierre (1787). Mémoire présenté au Roi. Paris. p. 31.
- Milliot, Vincent; Lenoir, Jean-Charles-Pierre (2011). Un policier des Lumières followed by Mémoires de J. C. P. Lenoir, ancien lieutenant général de police de Paris, écrits en pays étrangers dans les années 1790 et suivantes. Seyssel: Champ vallon, impr. p. 1141. ISBN 978-2-87673-553-8.

== Sources ==
- Darnton, Robert (July 1970). "The Memoirs of Lenoir, Lieutenant de Police of Paris, 1774-1785". The English Historical Review. 85 (336). Oxford University Press: 532–559. doi:10.1093/ehr/LXXXV.336.532. JSTOR 563194.
- Darnton, Robert (2009-06-30). The Business of Enlightenment: a publishing history of the Encyclopédie, 1775-1800. Harvard University Press. ISBN 978-0-674-03018-3.
- DiCaprio, Lisa (2007). The Origins of the Welfare State: Women, Work, and the French Revolution. University of Illinois Press. ISBN 978-0-252-03021-5.
- Dulaure, J. A. (1824). Histoire physique, civile et morale de Paris, depuis les premiers temps historiques jusqu'a nos jours (in French). Vol. VIII.
- Garrioch, David (2014-02-13). The Huguenots of Paris and the Coming of Religious Freedom, 1685–1789. Cambridge University Press. ISBN 978-1-107-04767-9.
- Gillispie, Charles Coulston (2004-07-06). Science and Polity in France: The End of the Old Regime. Princeton University Press. ISBN 0-691-11849-3.
- Goodman, Dena (1996-01-01). The Republic of Letters: A Cultural History of the French Enlightenment. Cornell University Press. ISBN 0-8014-8174-0.
- Hemmings, F. W. J. (1994). Theatre and State in France, 1760–1905 (2006 reprint ed.). New York: Cambridge University Press. ISBN 978-0-521-03472-2.
- Howarth, William D, ed. (1997). French Theatre in the Neo-classical Era, 1550–1789. Cambridge: Cambridge University Press. ISBN 978-0-521-10087-8.
- Kaplan, Steven L. (1996-06-19). The Bakers of Paris and the Bread Question, 1700-1775. Duke University Press. ISBN 0-8223-1706-0.
- Loft, Leonore (2002). Passion, Politics, and Philosophie: Rediscovering J.-P. Brissot. Greenwood Publishing Group. ISBN 978-0-313-31779-8.
- Massard-Guilbaud, Geneviève; Mosley, Stephen (2010-10-12). Common Ground: Integrating the Social and Environmental in History. Cambridge Scholars Publishing. ISBN 978-1-4438-2601-3.
- Milliot, Vincent (2013). "L'écriture du chaos. Les " mémoires " de Jean-Charles-Pierre Lenoir (1732-1807) ou le monde perdu d'un ancien lieutenant général de police". Annales historiques de la Révolution française (373): 35–57. doi:10.4000/ahrf.12853.
- "Notice biographique Jean Lenoir" (in French). Société française d'histoire de la police.
- Milliot, Vincent (2011). Un Policier des Lumières, suivi de mémoires de J.-C.P. Lenoir (1732-1807), ancien lieutenant général de Police de Paris, écrits dans les pays étrangers dans les années 1790 et suivantes. Champ Vallon. ISBN 978-2876735538.
- Price, Munro (2004-01-29). Preserving the Monarchy: The Comte de Vergennes 1774-1787. Cambridge University Press. ISBN 978-0-521-52706-4.
- Ramsey, Matthew (2002-06-06). Professional and Popular Medicine in France 1770-1830: The Social World of Medical Practice. Cambridge University Press. ISBN 978-0-521-52460-5.
- Schaeper, Thomas J. (2011). Edward Bancroft: Scientist, Author, Spy. Yale University Press. ISBN 978-0-300-11842-1.
- Sherwood, Joan (2010-09-09). Infection of the Innocents: Wet Nurses, Infants, and Syphilis in France, 1780-1900. McGill-Queen's Press - MQUP. ISBN 978-0-7735-3741-5.
- Spary, E. C. (2010-12-15). Utopia's Garden: French Natural History from Old Regime to Revolution. University of Chicago Press. ISBN 978-0-226-76870-0.

== See also ==
- William Eden, 1st Baron Auckland
- Paul Wentworth
