= Anne Thoynard de Jouy =

French nobleman

Anne-Thoynard de Jouy, comtesse d’Esparbès de Lussan (1739–1825), was a French noblewoman, mistress to Louis XV from 1763 to 1765. She was the king's Petite maîtresse (unofficial mistress), not his Maîtresse-en-titre (official mistress).

She was the daughter of Barthélémy-François Thoynard and Anne-Marie-Jacqueline Lallemant de Lévignen, and married in 1758 Count Jean-Jacques Pierre d'Esparbès de Lussan du Gout, comte d'Esparbès. She was one of the secret lovers of the king in 1763. Upon the death of Madame de Pompadour in 1764, she was one of the two main contestants to succeed Pompadour as the official mistress of the king, as this role could only be filled by a noblewoman of the court and not by one of the lovers of Parc-aux-Cerfs, nor by his secret mistress Anne Couffier de Romans. She and Béatrix de Choiseul-Stainville were the two contestants of this role and their rivalry attracted much attention at court. In 1765, she was however banned from court.
