= Gassicourt =

Gassicourt may refer to:

- Gassicourt, a former commune of France, now a part of Mantes-la-Jolie
- Louis Claude Cadet de Gassicourt (1731-1799), French chemist
