= Antoine Sartine =

French-born financier and Spanish administrator

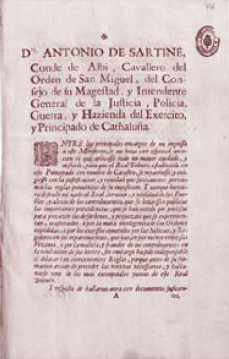
First page of the ordenanza (edict) of 1735 reforming the cadastre of Catalonia.

Antoine Sartine (French pronunciation: [ɑ̃twan saʁtin]; 1681–1744), later known as Antonio de Sartine, was a French-born financier and Spanish administrator.

Born in Lyon, France, within a family of shopkeepers, he became acquainted with some financiers and made a fortune supplying the troops of the French-born king Philip V of Spain during the War of the Spanish Succession (1701–1714). Antoine Sartine followed in the steps of other financiers enriched by supplying troops, such as the Pâris family who were related to the famous Marquise de Pompadour.

Antoine Sartine moved into Spain following the troops of Philip V. He was quite in favor with the king, and in 1715 he became a member of the General Revenues (Rentas Generales) administration. In 1718 he acceded to the office of councilor in the Finance Council (Consejo de Hacienda) and was ennobled, becoming Antonio de Sartine. Eventually, in 1726 he was appointed intendente (i.e. governor) of Catalonia.

The autonomous institutions of Catalonia had been abolished by the Nueva Planta decrees at the end of the War of the Spanish Succession, in which Catalonia had sided against Philip V, and so Catalonia was now largely ruled by the intendente sent by Madrid. Antonio de Sartine was thus the effective ruler of Catalonia for almost two decades, from 1726 until his death in 1744.

Antonio de Sartine is most remembered as the architect of the ordenanza (edict) bearing his name (December 20, 1735) which completely reformed the cadastre in Catalonia. With this ordenanza, Sartine launched a profound reform which updated the cadastre registers, systematized land taxation, and clarified the tax liability of members of the Church and the administrative mechanisms of the tax itself, endowing the system with a degree of quality, reliability, and equity which it had previously lacked.

Antonio de Sartine married Catherine White, Countess of Alby, lady-in-waiting to the Queen, who was the daughter of Ignatius White, Secretary of State for the Kingdom of Ireland. He was the father of French statesman Antoine de Sartine.
