= Marie Thérèse Françoise Boisselet =

French royal mistress (1731–1800)

Marie Thérèse Françoise Boisselet (1731 – 1800) was a petite maîtresse of King Louis XV of France.

Boisselet was born to Pierre Sulpice Boisselet and Marie Thérèse Carouailles. Her father was an employee of the king's kitchen staff, with the title 'Contrôleur de la Bouche du Roi et chef du gobelet de Mme la Dauphine'. Marie Thérèse Françoise Boisselet was described as a beauty, and she agreed to become the lover of the king. The affair was not an official one; she was recruited to be a petite maîtresse (unofficial mistress) of the king in Parc-aux-Cerfs. She had one child with the king, Charles Louis Cadet de Gassicourt (1769–1821).

In 1771, she married the chemist Louis Claude Cadet de Gassicourt, who adopted her son. According to Paul Thiébault, Louis XV benefitted the career of Cadet de Gassicourt in the Royal Academy because of his marriage to his former lover.
