= Antoine-Alexis Cadet de Vaux =

French chemist and pharmacist

Antoine-Alexis Cadet de Vaux (1743–1828) was a French chemist and pharmacist.

== Career ==
Antoine-Alexis Cadet de Vaux was born in Paris on 11 January 1743, the youngest of seven boys. His father was Claude Cadet, first physician of King Louis XIV. When his father died in 1745 Monsieur de Saint-Laurent, former General Treasurer of colonies, took responsibility for the family, making sure the children were well-educated. In 1771 Cadet de Vaux succeeded his brother, Louis Claude Cadet de Gassicourt, as chief apothecary of the Hotel des Invalides. He then became chief pharmacist at the Val-de-Grâce and chemistry professor at the Veterinary School of Alfort.

He became head of a pharmacy, Rue Saint-Antoine, which he abandoned three years later to study science and rural economy. In 1772, he helped Parmentier to create the first free school for baking.

The school was considered so useful that the pair were brought to travel through France to spread the use of good practices and new methods. Along with Antoine Parmentier, he performed experiments and published on public health, the culture of wine and agricultural economics. In 1777 he founded the Journal de Paris, which flourished under his supervision and contributions. He was friends with Benjamin Franklin, inventor, publisher, American Founding father and the United States Minister to France from 1778 to 1785. He was a member of the Academic Society of Sciences and a member of the Royal Agricultural Society of Paris from 1787.

In 1778, with his friend and Agricultural Society member Antione Parmentier, he obtained the King's permission to found a newspaper, the Journal de Paris. This newspaper was under the direction of his friends Marquis de Condorcet, Garat, and André Chénier. But until 1820, Cadet de Vaux continued to present his scientific observations. He reached Franconville in 1778, helping to provide and equip the National Guard of which he was the commander. He declared, "I have six brothers to all of us, we lose 60,000 livres from the recent political events, we are no less patriotic and for the return of our property, we would not see the rebirth of the old order of things."

In 1780 the police chief Jean-Charles-Pierre Lenoir made Cadet de Vaux the "salubrity inspector" of Paris. Cadet de Vaux used muriatic acids, combustion of smoke, efficient ventilation and other innovative methods to disinfect insanitary workshops and public places. At the time of the Revolution, Cadet de Vaux still served as Inspector General. As such, he wrote many books, and treatises on "mephitis". It led to the removal of the Cemetery of Innocents in the heart of Paris. Disappointed by political life, he devoted himself to fighting hunger and his agronomy research. He instigated the first agricultural fair. His essay honoring Jacques Philippe Martin Cels Do we not owe him the first road signs of France? was rejected by the Academy of Sciences.

He was elected to the American Philosophical Society in 1787.

=== Family ===
Father Claude Cadet was born in 1695 at Regnault (currently Renault Dawn Fresnoy), near Troyes, the son of a poor farmer. His medical talent got him admitted to the department of Surgery at Hôtel-Dieu of Paris. Around this time, scurvy was rampant in Paris. His essay on scurvy cures gained attention. Among his cures was wine. Claude Cadet became personal physician to Louis XIV. He had 13 children, six girls and seven boys.

He married Louise-Victoire Delaplace on 4 July 1773. He had known three sons - Benjamin, Charles-Antoine, and Marcellen.

== Sources ==
- Ducoeur, Gérard (July 2009). "Cadet de Vaux (1743-1828) à Franconville" (in French). Association pour la promotion de l’histoire et du patrimoine de la Vallée de Montmorency.
- Massard-Guilbaud, Geneviève; Mosley, Stephen (2010-10-12). Common Ground: Integrating the Social and Environmental in History. Cambridge Scholars Publishing. ISBN 978-1-4438-2601-3.
