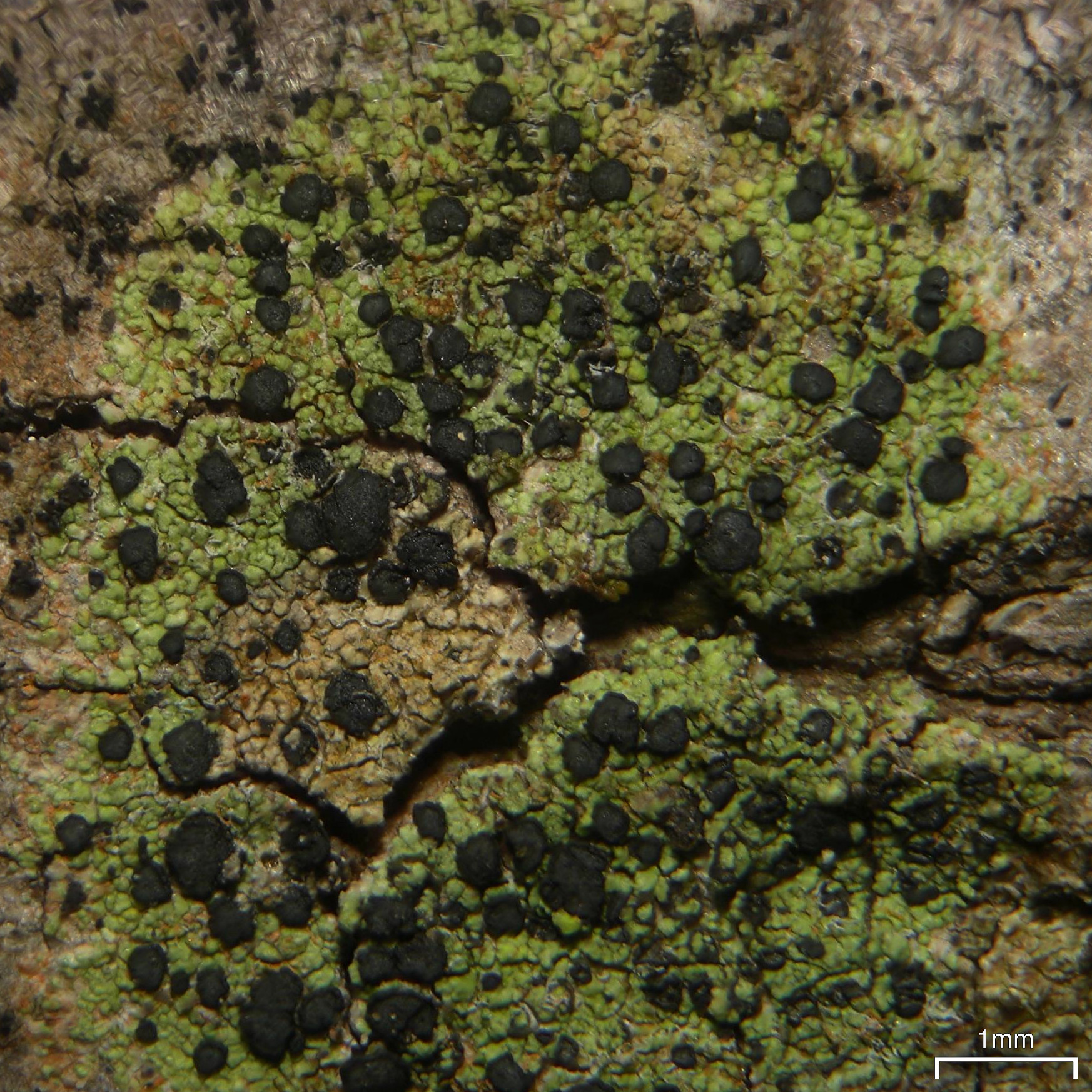
- Gassicurtia vernicoma, found in North Carolina, US

Scientific classification
- Domain: Eukaryota
- Kingdom: Fungi
- Division: Ascomycota
- Class: Lecanoromycetes
- Order: Caliciales
- Family: Caliciaceae
- Genus: Gassicurtia; Feé (1825)

Type species
- Gassicurtia coccinea Fée (1825)

= Gassicurtia =

Genus of lichens in the family Caliciaceae

Gassicurtia is a genus of lichenized fungi in the family Caliciaceae.

== Taxonomy ==
The genus was circumscribed by French botanist Antoine Laurent Apollinaire Fée in Essai Crypt. Exot. (Paris) 1: XLVI, 100 in 1825.

The genus name of Gassicurtia is in honour of Louis Claude Cadet de Gassicourt (1731–1799) who was a French chemist who synthesised the first organometalic compound.

It was later resurrected by Bernhard Marbach in his 2000 monograph on Buellia sensu lato. The genus contains species that are part of the tropical Buellia group with 2-celled ascospores, and which lack algae in the margin.

== Species ==
As of January 2024, Species Fungorum accepts 36 species in the genus Gassicurtia:

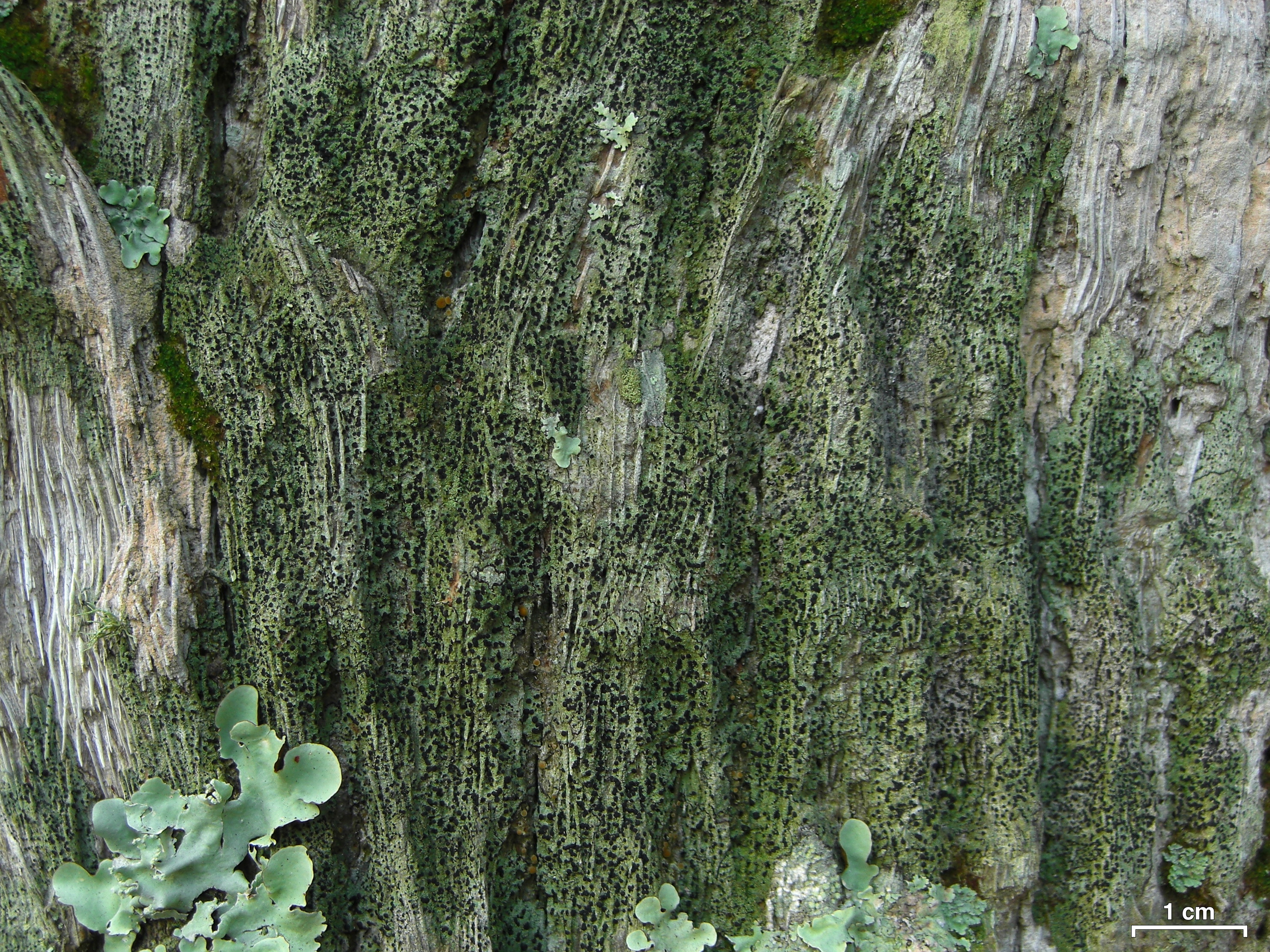
Gassicurtia catasema

- Gassicurtia acidobaeomyceta Marbach (2000)
- Gassicurtia albomarginata Elix (2016)
- Gassicurtia azorica Van den Boom (2020)
- Gassicurtia bellardii (Sipman) Marbach (2000)
- Gassicurtia blencoensis Elix (2016) – Australia
- Gassicurtia capricornica Elix (2016) – Australia
- Gassicurtia caririensis M.M.E.Alves, Aptroot & M.Cáceres (2014) – Brazil
- Gassicurtia catasema (Tuck.) Marbach (2000)
- Gassicurtia chermesina (Kalb) Marbach (2000)
- Gassicurtia clathrisidiata Aptroot (2007) – Thailand
- Gassicurtia coccifera Marbach & Kalb (2000)
- Gassicurtia coccinea Fée (1825)
- Gassicurtia coccinoides Marbach (2000)
- Gassicurtia dodecaspora (Müll.Arg.) Marbach (2000)
- Gassicurtia elizae (Tuck.) Marbach (2000)
- Gassicurtia endococcinea (Vain.) Aptroot (2017) – Brazil
- Gassicurtia ferruginascens (Malme) Marbach & Kalb (2000)
- Gassicurtia gallowayi Elix & Kantvilas (2015) – Australia
- Gassicurtia jamesii Elix (2018) – New Zealand
- Gassicurtia lignatilis Fée (1837)
- Gassicurtia lopesiana Aptroot & M.F. Souza (2021)
- Gassicurtia manguensia Marbach (2000)
- Gassicurtia marbachii Kalb & Elix (2009)
- Gassicurtia nordinii Kalb & Elix (2009)
- Gassicurtia omiae Kalb (2009)
- Gassicurtia pruinosa Aptroot & M.F. Souza (2021)
- Gassicurtia pseudosubpulchella Marbach (2000)
- Gassicurtia restingiana D.S.Andrade, M.Cáceres & Aptroot (2020) – Brazil
- Gassicurtia rhizocarpoides Aptroot & M.Cáceres (2018) – Brazil
- Gassicurtia rubromarginata M.M.E.Alves, Aptroot & M.Cáceres (2014) – Brazil
- Gassicurtia rufofuscescens (Vain.) Marbach (2000)
- Gassicurtia silacea Fée (1834)
- Gassicurtia subpulchella (Vain.) Marbach (2000)
- Gassicurtia vaccinii (Vain.) Marbach, Elix & Kalb (2000)
- Gassicurtia vernicoma Marbach (2000)
- Gassicurtia victoriana Elix & Kantvilas (2015) – Australia
