= François Joseph de Choiseul, Marquis of Stainville =

François Joseph de Choiseul
- Marquis of Stainville
- Coat of arms of the Marquis of Stainville.
- Full name: François Joseph de Choiseul
- Born: 12 January 1696; Chassey-Beaupré
- Died: 27 November 1769 (aged 73); Paris, France
- Spouse: Françoise Louise de Bassompierre
- Issue: Étienne François, Duke of Choiseul; Jacques Philippe, Duke of Stainville; Béatrix, Duchess of Gramont

François Joseph de Choiseul, Marquis of Stainville (12 January 1696 - 27 November 1769) was a diplomat and courtier in the service of the Dukes of Lorraine. His title was derived from the village of Stainville in Lorraine.

He was a chief advisor later serving as Ambassador to Britain and France. When the House of Lorraine were ousted from Lorraine during the War of the Polish Succession in the 1730s, he followed them to their new territory of Tuscany.

He married Françoise Louise de Bassompierre, descended from François de Bassompierre, another nobleman of Lorraine. De Stainville is best known as the father of Étienne François, duc de Choiseul, the French statesmen who served as Chief Minister between 1758 and 1770. François Choiseul had chosen to send his eldest son into the French army. Another son served in the Austrian army where he rose to be a General.

== Children ==
1. Étienne François de Choiseul, Duke of Choiseul (28 June 1719 – 8 May 1785) married Louise Honorine Crozat no children.
2. Jacques Philippe de Choiseul, Duke of Stainville (6 September 1727 - 2 June 1789) married Thomasse Thérèse de Clermont and had children.
3. Béatrix de Choiseul (18 November 1729 - 17 April 1794) married Antoine de Gramont, 7th Duke of Gramont.

== Bibliography ==
- McLynn, Frank (2005). 1759: The Year Britain Became Master of the World. Pimlico.
- Soltau, Roger H (1909). The Duke de Choiseul.
