= Brigitte O'Murphy =

Marie Brigitte O'Murphy (1729–1793), was a mistress to King Louis XV of France from 1755 to 1757. She was the king's Petite maîtresse (unofficial mistress), not his Maîtresse-en-titre (official mistress).

She was one of twelve children of Daniel Morfi and Marguerite Iquy. She was the elder sister of Marie-Louise O'Murphy. In 1755, she was recruited to replace her sister as a petite maîtresse (unofficial mistress) of the king in Parc-aux-Cerfs by Dominique Guillaume Lebel.

In contrast to her sisters, she was not described as a beauty nor as a prostitute, but as a virtuous girl scarred by pockmarks who supported herself by making false ornamental pearls and as an artist's model. René Louis de Voyer de Paulmy d'Argenson commented that her lack of beauty was not a problem because the king was stimulated by the fact that she was the sister of his previous mistress, as it was his taste to go from sister to sister after his affair with the Mailly-Nesle sisters. Charles Philippe d'Albert de Luynes noted that the king had two lovers in the Parc-aux-cerfs at this point and that one of them was a good painter who had painted him, and this painter is identified as Brigitte O'Murphy.

Brigitte O'Murphy was fired from her position in 1757, and it is noted that she was given a pension on 26 July 1757. She never married. In 1770, her pension was extended, and it was noted in the report filed in connection to this that she lived a respectable life. Louis XVI allowed her to keep the pension when he came to the throne in 1774, at which point it is noted to have amounted to the substantial amount of 3000 francs. She attended the wedding of her nephew Louis-Charles de Beaufranchet d'Ayat in 1783.

She is noted to have had a good relationship with her sister Marie-Louise O'Murphy, who left Brigitte in charge of her estate and castle Soisy in 1792, when Marie-Louise left for Le Havre during the French Revolution. Brigitte continued to manage her sister's property when Marie-Louise was imprisoned during the Reign of Terror of Maximilien Robespierre. Brigitte O'Murphy was herself not imprisoned. She died in her sister's castle in 1793, during Marie-Louise's imprisonment.
