= Gassicurtia omiae =

Scientific classification
- Kingdom: Fungi
- Division: Ascomycota
- Class: Lecanoromycetes
- Order: Caliciales
- Family: Caliciaceae
- Genus: Gassicurtia
- Species: G. omiae

Binomial name
- Gassicurtia omiae Kalb (2009)
- Holotype site: Queen Sirikit Botanic Garden, Thailand

Species of lichen

Gassicurtia omiae is a species of corticolous (bark-dwelling), crustose lichen in the family Caliciaceae. Found in Thailand, it was formally described as a new species in 2009 by lichenologist Klaus Kalb. The species epithet omiae honours Mrs. W. Saipunkaew ("Om"), who assisted the author as a guide and discovered the species in the field. Gassicurtia omiae is the first species of Gassicurtia with a sorediate thallus and the first that produces the lichen product 6-O-methylarthothelin.
