= Journal de Paris =

French newspaper (1777–1840)

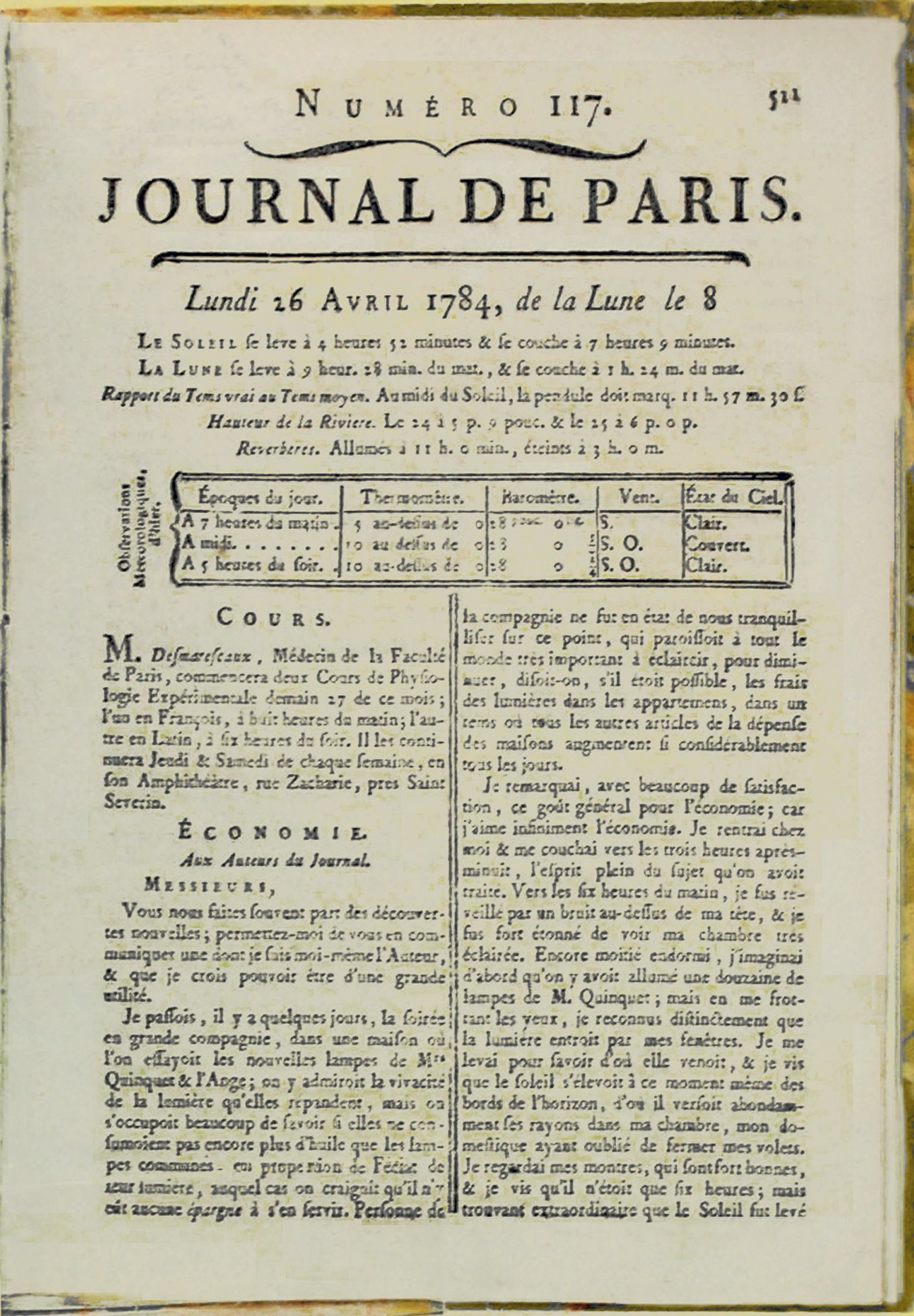
- Page of Journal de Paris, 16 April 1784
- Type: Daily newspaper
- Founded: 1 January 1777
- Ceased publication: 17 May 1840
- Language: French
- Headquarters: Paris, France

The Journal de Paris (1777–1840) was the first daily French newspaper.

The paper was founded by Antoine-Alexis Cadet de Vaux, Jean Romilly, Olivier de Corancez, and Louis d'Ussieux, in 1777, following the model of the London Evening Post. The four-page daily paper eschewed politics in favor of popular culture, the weather, and other light-hearted culture, which made it the subject of jesting in its day. Nevertheless, the model proved popular. In 1784, the paper famously published an anonymous satirical letter by Benjamin Franklin encouraging Parisians to rise earlier in the day, which has been credited (though an overreach) with promoting the concept of daylight saving time.

The paper did increase its coverage of politics as dictated by French events, and was publishing a supplement in 1789 covering the National Assembly. The paper was shut down after the Insurrection of 10 August 1792 for 50 days. With the support of Napoleon, the paper expanded its format and scope in 1811. Though it never recovered its former glory, its most well-known later writer was Henri Fonfrède.
