= Louise-Jeanne Tiercelin de La Colleterie =

Mistress of the French king Louis XV

Louise-Jeanne Tiercelin de La Colleterie (26 December 1746 – 5 July 1779), also known as Madame de Bonneval, was a mistress to King Louis XV of France from 1762 to 1765. She was the king's Petite maîtresse (unofficial mistress), rather than his Maîtresse-en-titre (official mistress).

== Biography ==
Louise-Jeanne was born in Mortagne on 26th December 1746, the daughter of Jeanne-Jacqueline Vautorte and a guardsman named Pierre Tiercelin de La Colleterie. Her father was supposedly a "bastard of a noble house of the name of Tiercelin". Louise-Jeanne had two brothers, one of whom received a pension from Louis XVI, retiring from his service with the rank of infantry colonel. He died in 1833 aged 88. She also had a sister born in 1749 who became a nun in the Ursulines convent at Saint-Germain-en-Laye.

At the age of 11, she was recruited by palace valet Dominique Guillaume Lebel to be trained to become a petite maîtresse (unofficial mistress) of King Louis XV of France at his Parc-aux-Cerfs residence in the grounds of the Palace of Versailles. She assumed this position at the age of 16 in 1762. When she arrived, two other petites maîtresses Marguerite-Catherine Haynault and Lucie Madeleine d'Estaing were already staying at the Parc-aux-Cerfs.

Louise reportedly threw gifts from king at him while screaming "I hate you, you're as ugly as a beast!", which apparently did not offend the king but rather amused him.

She quickly become pregnant and on the 7th February 1764 gave birth to the king's son: Benoît-Louis Le Duc. The baby was baptised in Saint Paul parish in Paris, with his parents' names registered as "Louis Le Duc" and "Julie de La Colleterie". Benoît-Louis later became an abbot in Paris, and died in 1837.

When the abbot de Lustrac encouraged her to plot to have her son legitimised, the king ended the affair and had her imprisoned in the Bastille on 25th July 1765. She was released on 18th August and sent to a nunnery, but was allowed to keep the furniture and clothes the king had given her, and was granted a pension of 12,000 livres. Dissatisfied with this amount, Louise incessantly harangued the comte de Saint-Florentin, Minister of the Maison du roi, with requests for more money. After pleading ill health, the king was finally moved enough to grant her a larger pension of 30,000 livres.

She never married, and lived the rest of her life as a boarder in several convents. She was almost engaged to the nephew of the countess of La Fontaine Solare-Vaudegré, but the Lieutenant General of Police, de Sartine, refused the match.

She had several other love affairs, notably with the Comte de Langeac and was rumoured to have been with the Anglo-American naval officer John Paul Jones. She was often in debt, spending about 100,000 livres annually, which was paid by the royal treasury; both by Louis XV and his successor Louis XVI.

She died of cancer on 5 July 1779, at the age of 32, in the same convent where her sister was in Holy orders.
