= Louis Thiroux de Crosne =

French police chief

Louis Thiroux De Crosne
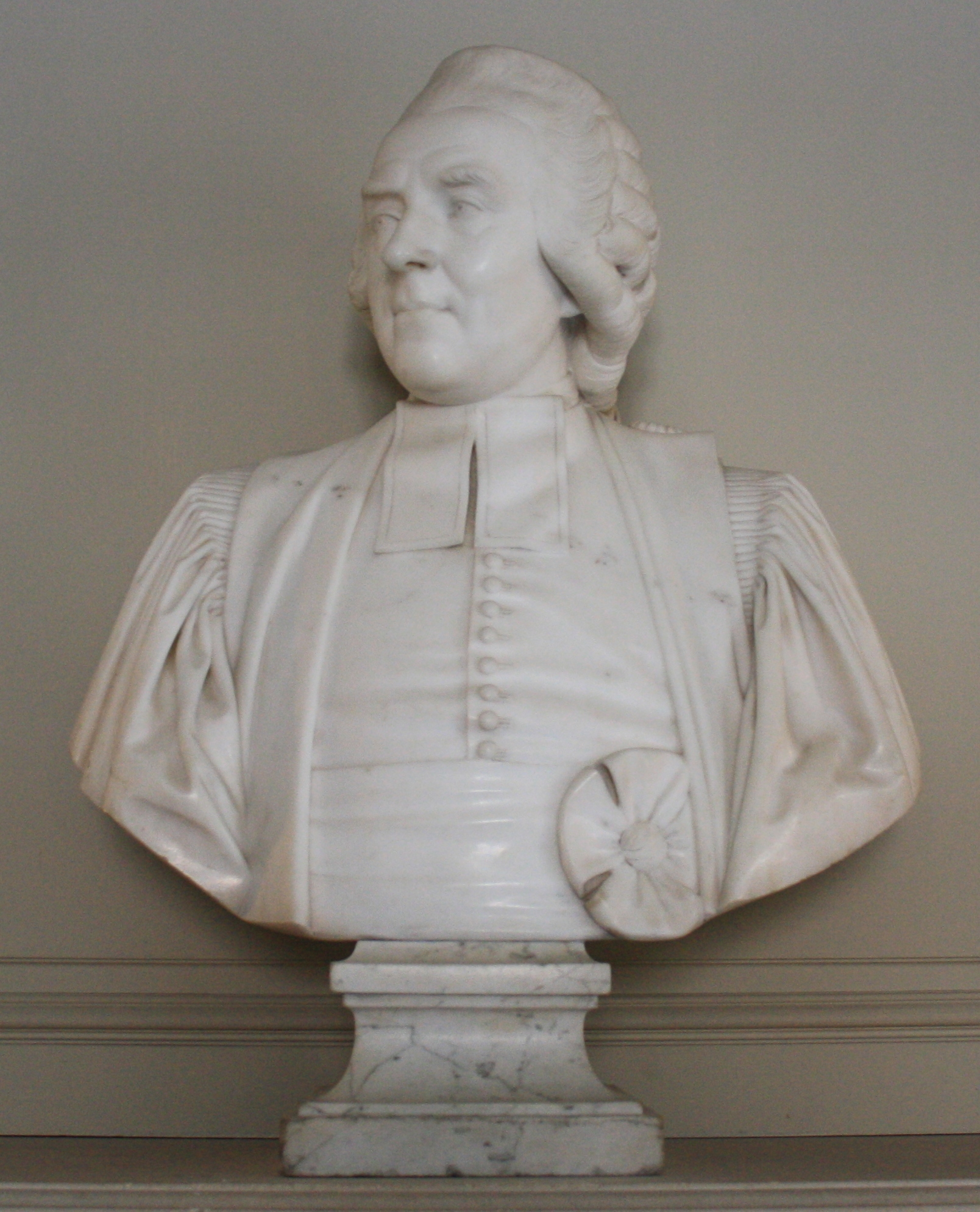
- Statue of Louis Thiroux de Crosne by Augustin Pajou in 1788
- Born: 14 July 1736; Paris, Kingdom of France
- Died: 28 April 1794 (aged 57); Paris, French First Republic
- Cause of death: Execution by guillotine
- Occupation: Chief of Police

Louis Thiroux de Crosne (14 July 1736 – 28 April 1794) was Lieutenant général de Police (Chief of the Police) in Paris from 1785 to the beginning of the French Revolution. He was executed on 28 April 1794 during the Reign of Terror. Prior to becoming Chief of the Police in Paris he was Intendant de la généralité of Rouen from 1767.

== Biography ==
De Crosne was the son of Louis-Lazare Thiroux Arconville, President of the Chamber of Investigation of the Parliament of Paris, and Marie-Geneviève Charlotte Darlus. On 24 January 1763, he married Anne-Adelaide Angelique de la Michodière (1745-Paris, 6 September 1812), eldest daughter of Jean-Baptiste-François of Michodière, Count d'Hauteville and State Councilor, and Anne Luthier St. Martin. Their only son, Jean-Charles-Amédée Thiroux Arconville (circa 1778–1835) married Marie Louise Mayou Aulnoy, daughter of a councilor at the Parliament of Dijon.

== Career ==
De Crosne worked as an adviser at the Paris parliament 20 August 1758, then as master of requests by provisions of 13 July 1761. In 1767, he was master of fee requests, and he resigned on 1 May 1773. Appointed steward assistant to the generality of Rouen in 1767, he replaced his father-in steward job in 1768. He was appointed first president of the Supreme Council created by the Maupeou reform in Rouen in 1771. In 1777 he was intendant of Lorraine and Barrois in Metz. He returned to Rouen in 1778 and remained there until 30 July 1785. The city owes the Esplanade du Champ de Mars, exercise ground for the military, barracks and moving the powder stores outside the walls. It also owes the filling of ditches, leveling the input bastions of the walls and their replacement by grids and the completion of a ring road planted with trees. He was appointed lieutenant general city police of Paris by judgment of the State Council of 30 July 1785, he succeeds Lenoir 11 August 1785, and remained in that position until the French Revolution. It is in this capacity that oversees the development ossuary of the Catacombs of Paris. It removes already closed cemeteries in the capital, eliminated the houses on the bridges of Paris, and participates with Louis Bénigne François Berthier de Sauvigny, intendant of the generality of Paris from 1744 to 1776, to the achievement of workshops to provide employment to the poor. He resigns in favor of Jean Sylvain Bailly (1736–1793), 17 July 1789. He remains in 1786 Rue Neuve des Capucines. After returning emigration from England, he is locked in Picpus with his mother in 1792 and executed during the Terror, 28 April 1794. The next day the Journal de Paris announced that he was "convinced of plots and conspiracies against freedom, security and sovereignty of the French people."
