= Jean-Baptiste Boyer-Fonfrède =

French Girondin politician

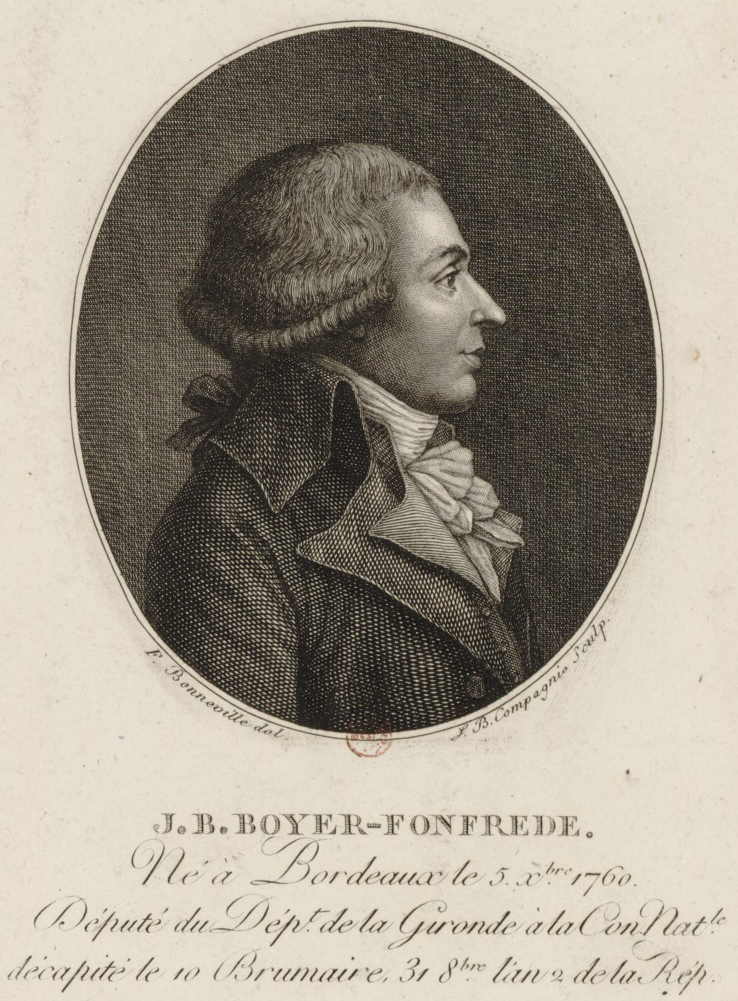
- Jean-Baptiste Boyer-Fonfrède, print by François Bonneville c. 1797

17th President of the National Convention
- In office 2–16 May 1793
- Preceded by: Marc David Alba Lasource
- Succeeded by: Maximin Isnard

Personal details
- Born: 5 December 1760 Bordeaux, Gironde, Kingdom of France
- Died: 31 October 1793 (aged 37) Paris, France
- Cause of death: Execution by Guillotine
- Resting place: Madeleine Cemetery; Catacombs of Paris
- Party: Girondins
- Children: Henri Fonfrède (son)

Jean-Baptiste Boyer-Fonfrède (French pronunciation: [ʒɑ̃ batist bwaje fɔ̃fʁɛd]; 5 December 1760 – 31 October 1793) was a French Girondin politician.

Boyer-Fonfrède was a deputy to the National Convention from his native city, Bordeaux. In 1792, he voted for the death of Louis XVI. He denounced the September Massacres and accused Jean-Paul Marat. He was tried, condemned, and guillotined in Paris with the leading Girondin deputies on 31 October 1793.

His son Henri Fonfrède (1788–1841) made his name as a publicist defending liberal ideas in Bordeaux's main newspaper under the Bourbon Restoration.

== In literature ==
Boyer-Fonfrède, together with his best friend, fellow deputy Jean-François Ducos, appears in a supporting role in the historical mystery novel Palace of Justice (2010) by Susanne Alleyn.
