= Jean-François Ducos =

French politician (1765–1793)

Jean-François Ducos (26 October 1765 – 31 October 1793) was a French député for the Gironde to the Legislative Assembly then the National Convention.

== Life ==
The son of a merchant in Bordeaux, he was sent to Nantes to learn his trade but there became interested in politics and philosophy, joining several such circles, in which he gained a reputation for patriotism. This allowed him to be elected as a député for Gironde to the Legislative Assembly then the Convention. There he sat with the Girondins (but tended to favour the opinions of the Montagnards) and took up marked positions, such as in the issues surrounding Louis XVI, the abolition of the monarchy and the question of the refractory priests. He was virulently opposed to La Fayette.

Protection from Marat meant he escaped a purge on 2 June 1793, but he fell under suspicion due to his protests against the arrests of his colleagues. He was mentioned in the report by Amar on 3 October 1793 and condemned to death on 30 October. He was guillotined on 31 October alongside other Girondins, including his friend and brother-in-law Jean-Baptiste Boyer-Fonfrède. Noted for his caustic wit, Ducos reputedly remarked, while awaiting his turn at the guillotine, "The Convention has forgotten one thing: a decree on the unity and indivisibility of heads and bodies."

== In popular culture ==
- Ducos, together with his friend Boyer-Fonfrède, appears in a supporting role in the historical mystery novel Palace of Justice (2010) by Susanne Alleyn.
