= Deer Park =

Deer Park or Deerpark may refer to:

- Deer park (England), parkland originally used by the nobility for hunting deer.

== Places ==
=== Australia ===
- Deer Park, Victoria, a suburb of Melbourne, located within the City of Brimbank
  - Deer Park railway station

=== Canada ===
- Deer Park, Toronto, Ontario, a neighborhood

=== France ===
- Parc-aux-Cerfs (English: Deer Park), a house at Versailles

=== India ===
- Sarnath, Uttar Pradesh, a deer park which was legendary site of the Buddha's first sermon
- Deer Park (Delhi), in the South Delhi locality of Hauz Khas

=== Republic of Ireland ===
- Deerpark, County Cavan, a townland in County Cavan

=== United Kingdom ===
- Deer Park, County Antrim, a townland in County Antrim, Northern Ireland
- Deer Park, County Fermanagh, a townland in County Fermanagh, Northern Ireland
- Deer Park, County Londonderry, a townland in County Londonderry, Northern Ireland
- Deer Park, County Tyrone, a townland in County Tyrone, Northern Ireland
- Deer Park, Nottinghamshire

=== United States ===
- Deer Park, Alabama
- Deer Park, California, in Napa County
- Deer Park, El Dorado County, California
- Deer Park, former name of Cedar Grove, Fresno County, California
- Deer Park, Florida
- Deer Park, Illinois
- Deer Park, Louisville, Kentucky, a neighborhood
- Deer Park, Maryland
  - The Deer Park Hotel, built following the American Civil War
- Deer Park, Michigan, an unincorporated community
- Deer Park Township, Pennington County, Minnesota
- Deer Park, Missouri
- Deer Park (Omaha, Nebraska), a neighborhood of Omaha
- Deer Park, New York, Long Island
  - Deer Park (LIRR station)
- Deerpark, New York, Orange County
- Deer Park, Ohio
- Deer Park, Texas
- Deer Park, Washington
- Deer Park, Wisconsin

== Other uses ==
- Cirencester Deer Park School, a secondary school in Cirencester, Gloucestershire, England
- Deer Park, the development name for Mozilla Firefox 1.5
- The Deer Park, a novel by Norman Mailer
- Deer Park Metropolitan Women's Correctional Centre, former name of the Dame Phyllis Frost Centre, a prison in Deer Park, Victoria, Australia
- Deerpark Mines, disused mine in County Kilkenny, Ireland
- Deer Park Monastery, a Buddhist monastery in Escondido, California
- Deer Park Refinery, Deer Park, Texas
- Deer Park Spring Water, a division of BlueTriton Brands
- Deer Park Tavern, a historical bar and restaurant in Newark, Delaware
- Michigan's Adventure, an amusement park formerly named Deer Park, in Muskegon, Michigan

== See also ==
- Old Deer Park, an area of open space in Richmond, London
