= Anne Couppier de Romans =

French mistress of King Louis XV

Anne Couppier
- Baronesse de Meilly-Coulonge
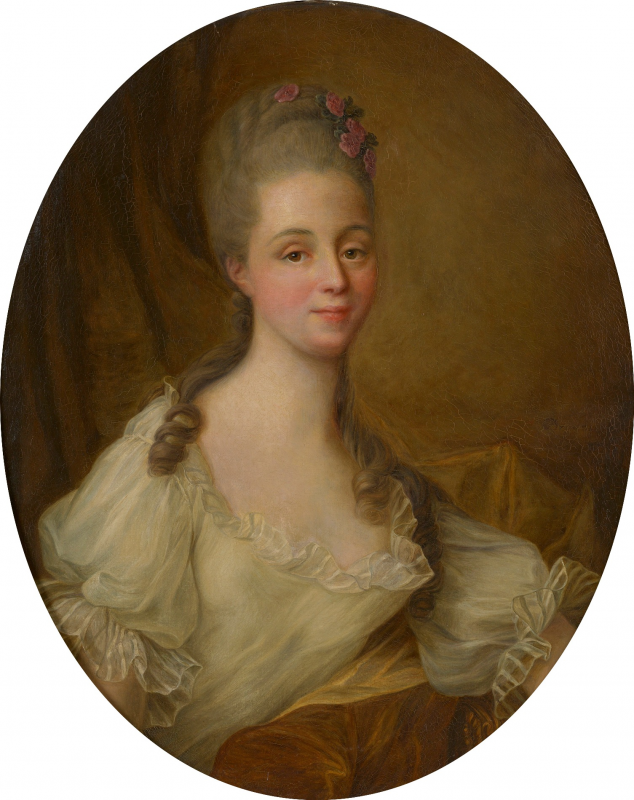
- Born: 1737
- Died: 1808 (aged 70–71)
- Spouse: Gabriel Guillaume de Siran (m. 1772; d. 1784)
- Issue: Louis Aimé de Bourbon
- Occupation: Petite maîtresse

Anne Couppier de Romans (1737 –1808) was a petite maîtresse (unofficial mistress) of King Louis XV of France from 1760 to 1765.

== Life ==
Anne Couppier de Romans was the daughter of an office clerk in Grenoble, Jean Joseph Roman Coppier, and Marie-Madeleine Armand. In 1760, she became acquainted with Giacomo Casanova, who made her a horoscope claiming that she would be the lover of the king. Her sister, Marie-Madeleine Couppier-Varnier, was a courtesan in Paris and connected to Dominique Guillaume Lebel, who provided the king with lovers for his Parc-aux-Cerfs.

=== Royal mistress ===
She became the Petite maîtresse (unofficial mistress) of the King in 1760, but she refused to become one of his lovers of the Parc-aux-Cerfs, where Marguerite-Catherine Haynault and Lucie Madeleine d'Estaing were housed at the time. Instead, she successfully demanded to be given her own house in Passy, where the king visited her. Her house was called Hotel de la Folie. The king soon gave her the title Baronesse de Meilly-Coulonge.

She had a son with the King: Louis Aimé de Bourbon (1761-1787), who, before becoming a priest, sired a child by Marie Caroline de Montsavant-Duverger. The king registered himself as the father of the child, which was unusual, as while he did take responsibility for many of his illegitimate children—he normally did not acknowledge them. Anne Couppier de Romans called her son 'Monseigneur', a title for a Prince, and displayed him in public in the Bois de Boulogne.

The special treatment given by the king to Anne Couppier de Romans, so unlike anything given to his lovers at the Parc-aux-Cerfs, reportedly worried Madame de Pompadour, the king’s Maîtresse-en-titre, and on one occasion she visited the Bois de Boulogne to observe Anne Couppier de Romans and her son.

=== Later life ===
In 1765, Anne Couppier de Romans was implicated in the affair of Louis-René de Caradeuc de La Chalotais. The same year, the king discontinued their affair and she was separated from her son. She was given an allowance of 500.000 livres, more than any of the lovers of the Parc-aux-Cerfs.

In 1772, she married Gabriel Guillaume de Siran, Marquis de Cavanac (d. 1784). In contrast to most lovers of the Parc-aux-Cerfs, her marriage was not arranged by the king. She had two children prior to their separation.

Anne left France during the French Revolution and lived in Spain during the Reign of Terror. After the fall of Robespierre, she returned to France and reclaimed her property. She died a millionaire.
