= Béatrix de Choiseul =

French courtier (1729 - 1794)

- Duchess of Gramont
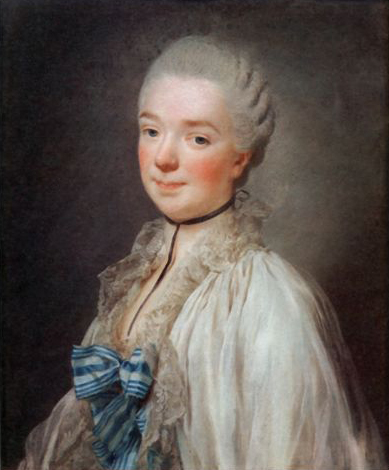
- Portrait de la duchesse de Grammont, by Alexander Roslin, c. 1774
- Full name: Béatrix de Choiseul
- Born: 18 November 1729; Lunéville
- Died: 17 April 1794 (aged 64); Paris
- Spouses: Antoine VII de Gramont, 7th Duke of Gramont
- Father: François Joseph de Choiseul, Marquis of Stainville
- Mother: Marie Louise Bassompierre

Béatrix de Choiseul, Duchess of Gramont (18 November 1729 - 17 April 1794) was a French salonnière and bibliophile. She was known for her close relationship to her brother the Duke of Choiseaul and credited with an influential position at court during his tenure as minister in 1758–1770. She is also known for her attempt to become the official mistress of Louis XV in the 1760s and her succeeding feud with Madame du Barry.

== Biography ==
=== Early life ===
Béatrix was the daughter of François Joseph, Marquis de Choiseul, Marquis of Stainville, and Marie Louise Bassompierre, and sister of Étienne François, duc de Choiseul. Unmarried, she was initially made canoness of Remiremont. When her brother was appointed minister, however, she was able to join him in Paris, and her negotiations were made to arrange a marriage for her, so that she would be able to attend court.

In 1759, she married Antoine VII, Duke of Gramont, governor of Navarre, after negotiations to marry her to Louis de Bauffremont failed. She separated from her spouse three months after the wedding and lived thereafter in the household of her brother, over whom she was credited some influence in several affairs. While her sister-in-law was described as a timid character who followed her lead, her close relationship to her brother was well known. She regularly attended court, became a significant figure in court life and a personal friend of Madame de Pompadour. She was described as proud, overbearing, and spiteful but also intelligent, witty and attractive, despite not being conventionally beautiful.

=== Ambitions ===
Upon the death of Madame de Pompadour in 1764, she had the ambition to succeed her as the official mistress of Louis XV. She shared this ambition with another friend of Pompadour, the Madame d'Esparbes, and their rivalry attracted attention at court. Her ambition was encouraged by her brother, but reportedly she attempted to seduce the king in such a direct manner that he became alarmed and avoided her by accepting the advances of her rival instead.

According to court gossip, Madame d'Esparbes was on the point of being declared official mistress when Choiseul caused a scene to prevent it. Meeting her one day on the grand staircase, he took her by the chin and exclaimed: "Well, little one, how are your affairs progressing?", which caused a scandal at court and made Louis XV discontinue the affair.

=== Madame du Barry ===
Béatrix continued her attempts to succeed as official royal mistress and reportedly believed herself to be near success when Madame du Barry attained the position in 1768. Béatrix in collaboration with her sister-in-law the Duchesse de Choiseul and the Princess of Beauvau, (referred to as "the Choiseul-women") led the noblewomen first in their efforts to prevent Madame du Barry from being presented at court and then to ostracize her from it. One idea, suggested by the Mesdames de France, was for the king to marry to either the Princess of Lamballe or Archduchess Maria Elisabeth of Austria, but the Choiseul party opposed a remarriage of the king, and according to the Count of Mercy-Argenteau:

"Persons in power, imagine that a queen, judicious and amiable, who would succeed in gaining the affection of her husband, might open his eyes to the irregularities and the enormous abuses which exist in all departments here, and cause much embarrassment to those who direct them. They are consequently of opinion that it behooves them to divert the mind of the King from ideas of marriage; and I have very strong proofs that Madame de Gramont, more interested than any one in the maintenance of the present abuses, has succeeded in persuading M. de Choiseul to renounce his own predilections in this affair."

After the formal introduction of Madame du Barry to court, the Choiseul-women excused themselves from the king's private suppers at the Petits Cabinets, effectively demonstrating that it was socially unacceptable for noblewomen to associate with Madame du Barry. The king defeated the boycott by enlisting initially the Marechale de Mirepoix (friend of Madame de Pompadour) and then several other noblewomen to integrate his mistress at court by acting as her companions.

When du Barry was officially accepted at court, the conflict developed into a personal feud between the king's mistress and the Choiseul party. The Duke de Lauzun was sent to mediate a message of peace from Madame du Barry to the Duke de Choiseul, but when he arrived, Choiseul was in the company of his sister and received the message "with all the haughtiness of a Minister who is harassed by women and believes that he has nothing to fear," and declared that there was "war to the knife" between him and Madame du Barry, while Béatrix "made some outrageous remarks, in which she did not spare even the King." The Comtesse de Gramont, lady-in-waiting to Marie Antoinette and the sister-in-law of Béatrix, participated in the continuing boycott and made a rude remark to du Barry, causing the king to exile the comtesse from court, creating discord between du Barry and Marie Antoinette.

During the affair regarding the Duc d'Aiguillon, she was accused of participating in a conspiracy organised by Choiseul. Mercy reported to Empress Maria Theresa that "the Duc de Choiseul had had a violent altercation with the Duc de Richelieu, owing to the latter having declared that Béatrix, while passing through Provence and Languedoc on her way to Bareges, had sought to stir up the Parliaments of those provinces against the decisions of the court in the affair of the Duc d'Aiguillon."

The conflict between du Barry and the Duke of Choiseul ultimately resulted in the dismissal and exile of Choiseul from court, for which du Barry on at least one occasion blamed Gramont:

"The conversation after dinner took a more serious turn. She spoke with a charming frankness about the Duc de Choiseul, and expressed regret for not having been on friendly terms with him; she told us of all the trouble she had taken to bring about a better understanding, and said that, had it not been for his sister, the Duchesse de Gramont, she would have succeeded in the end; she did not complain of anyone and said nothing spiteful."

=== Later life ===
Béatrix left court life when her brother was exiled and joined him and his wife in their life at Chanteloup. She became known as a distinguished bibliophile and hosted a noted literary salon. During the Reign of Terror, she was arrested and accused of providing funds for the royalist emigrees. Questioned before the Revolutionary Tribunal, which was to condemn her to the guillotine, she was asked, "Did you not send money to emigrants?" She replied: "I was going to say no, but my life is not worth a lie!"

She was executed by guillotine in Paris on April 17, 1794.

== Sources ==
- Louis Petit de Bachaumont, Anecdotes piquantes, Paris, Gay et Doucé, 1881, p. 285.
- Armand Louis de Gontaut-Biron, Mémoires du duc de Lauzun (1747–1783), Paris, Poulet-Malassis et de Broise, 1858, p. 8.
