= Henri Fonfrède =

French orator, publicist, and economist

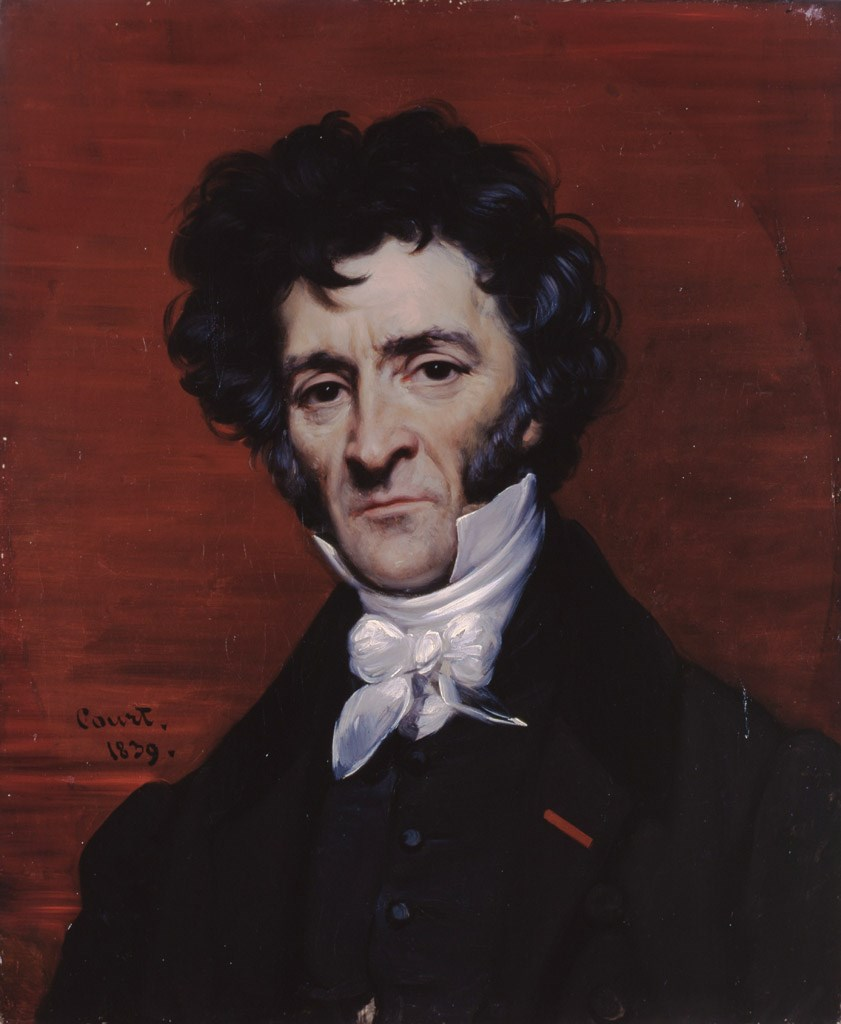

Henri Fonfrède (Bordeaux, 1788 – Bordeaux, 1841) was a French orator, publicist and economist. He made his name as a publicist defending liberal ideas in Bordeaux's main newspaper under the Bourbon Restoration. He was the son of Jean-Baptiste Boyer-Fonfrède, a French Girondist politician.

In the 1830s, he was among the rare French voices to sternly oppose the colonization of Algeria, denouncing it both from an economic and a humanitarian point of view. While still painting the Arabs as "belligerent, fanatics, of a religion that curses ours", Fonfrède recognized that the brutal conquest would only feed and intensify their "righteous resentment".
