= Dominique Guillaume Lebel =

First chamber servant of Louis XV

Dominique Guillaume Lebel (1696–1768) or also Le Bel, had the important court role of Premier valet de chambre for King Louis XV of France. He is mainly known in history for his role in providing lovers for the king and acting as his go-between in his love affairs. He is known as the person who provided women for the king's house in Parc-aux-Cerfs.

== Biography ==
One of his roles was to select young women as mistresses for his master. The tactic for this was to invite the young woman to a supper in a dining room in the palace of Versailles, and the monarch could examine her through a hole in the wall next door. If the king would find the girl sweet to his palate, she would then be informed and examined by Lebel, and later she was led into the boudoir of the king. They were otherwise housed at the Parc-aux-Cerfs. Among the lovers he provided for the king was Marguerite-Catherine Haynault, Lucie-Madeleine d'Estaing, Louise-Jeanne de Tiercelin de La Colleterie and Anne Couppier de Romans.

An account of this technique is found in most of the biographies of Jeanne Bécu, later to become Madame du Barry, when the Comte du Barry introduced her to Lebel through the Maréchal de Richelieu.

Jeanne was at the time in the employment of the count as courtesan entertaining his guests in his gambling house. As soon as Richelieu and Lebel spoke of the king's need for a new mistress to save him from his depression, the count pounced on the opportunity. Jeanne was invited to the palace, and the king became entranced by her beauty, nature, and ample bosom. When the king began all the more falling deeper in love with her, Lebel began to become alarmed, knowing the king might not be amused of Jeanne's past. When Lebel's conscience could take no more, he divulged all about Jeanne to the king, who scolded him harshly to have her married off to gain a title in order for her to become next royal mistress. This he did, but died soon after in 1768, some say either by poisoning or for taking the king's scolding too badly. During her time in Versailles awaiting a date for her official presentation, Jeanne was given Lebel's quarters as living space.
