= Ignatius White =

Irish advisor of Limerick origins to James II of England

Ignatius White was an Irish advisor of Limerick origins to James II of England, who sent him to The Hague in 1687 as an envoy extraordinary. His father, Dominick White, was Mayor of Limerick in 1636. Both the father and son (and their descendants) were granted the titles Marquess of Albyville (or Albeville) and Count of Alby, as well as greatly augmented arms and other privileges, in 1679 by Leopold I, Holy Roman Emperor.

== Family ==
White, one of six brothers, was born in Ireland about 1626. He was the son of Sir Dominick White, Mayor of Limerick in 1636, and Christina, daughter of Thomas, 4th Baron Bourke of Castleconnell.

By his wife, Mary Warron, he was the father of daughters:

- Anna White, who married Don Julián de O'Kallaghan.
- Catherine White, who married Antoine de Sartine, Knight of the Order of Saint Michael. Their son, Antoine de Sartine, Comte d'Alby, was Lieutenant General of Police for Paris, and later Secretary of State for the Navy under Louis XVI of France.
- Winifred White, who married Antonio Álvarez de Bohorques, Marqués de Ruchena.
- Mary White, who married Timon Connock, Brigadier and sub-governor for the Infante Don Felipe.
- Theresa White, who married William (Guillermo) Lacy, Knight of the Order of Santiago, maréchal de camp for the King of Spain and Inspector of Irish Infantry.

== Activities ==
White and some of his brothers (notably his brother Richard, alias Don Ricardo White) were acting as spies for various European governments by the mid-1650s and raising troops for the Spanish army. Ignatius White also performed some diplomatic services for the British government. In 1679 he and his father were created Count of Alby and Marquis or Markgraf of Albeville or Albyville by Emperor Leopold I, for themselves and their descendants. The titles of Count and Marquis were added to titles in the Holy Roman Empire inherited from their direct ancestor, another Dominick White, who was knighted upon the field of battle by Maximilian I and created a Baron (Freiherr) of the Holy Roman Empire in 1513.

Upon James II's accession to the British throne, Ignatius White of Albeville became a royal advisor and in 1687 went to The Hague as envoy extraordinary. After the Glorious Revolution, Albeville followed James into exile at Saint-Germain-en-Laye.

He died in St Germain on 21 August 1694, and was buried three months later (15 December 1694) at St Margaret's, Westminster, London.

== Titles ==
- Hereditary Knight. Holy Roman Empire, 1513
- Baron (Freiherr) of Alby, Holy Roman Empire, 1513
- Baron de Vique, Netherlands, date uncertain
- Baronet, England
- Count of Alby, Holy Roman Empire. 1679
- Marquis of Albeville or Albyville. Holy Roman Empire, 1679

Diplomatic posts
Preceded by Bevil Skelton	English Ambassador to the United Provinces; 1686–1688	Succeeded by Thomas Herbert, 8th Earl of Pembroke
