= Lydie de Rochefort-Théobon =

French aristocrat (1638–1708)

Rochefort-Théobon

Lydie de Rochefort-Théobon (1638–1708) was a French aristocrat.

She was the unofficial lover of king Louis XIV in 1670–1673. The relationship was a sexual on-and-off affair, which caused court gossip and irritated Madame de Montespan. She was the maid of honour of the queen and the king's sister-in-law.
