= Marguerite de Sassenage =

French noblewoman

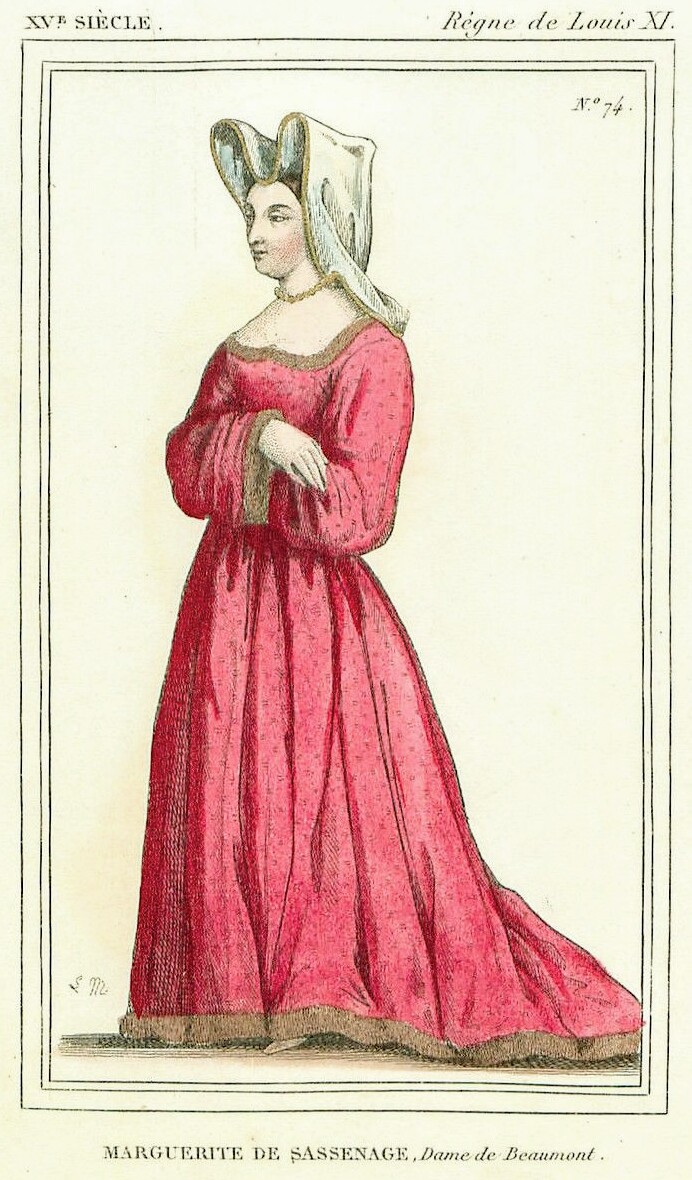
Marguerite de Sassenage Léopold Massard

Marguerite de Sassenage (French: [maʁɡəʁit də sasnaʒ]; 1424–1471) was a French noblewoman. She was a mistress to Louis XI before his accession as King of France. She had three daughters with Louis XI, who were all acknowledged by him.
