= Julie de Bourbon, Mademoiselle de Châteaubriant =

French aristocrat

Julie de Bourbon, Mademoiselle de Châteaubriant (1668–1710 or 1723) was a French aristocrat. She had a reputed affair with king Louis XIV in 1683, and have been called the last mistress of Louis XIV.

== Life ==
Julie de Châteaubriant was the illegitimate daughter of Henri Jules, Prince of Condé and the widowed governess Françoise Charlotte de Montalais. She was not openly acknowledged by her father, though the Condé family did unofficially tend to her welfare.

She was described as a lively, flirtatious beauty. She was the unofficial lover of king Louis XIV during 1683. It was a temporary, unofficial sexual affair. According to rumour, the affair was encouraged by the Condé family, who were in disfavour with the king, to benefit them. She has been referred to as the last mistress of the king, who in that same year married Madame de Maintenon, who asked him to stop having sex outside of marriage for the sake of his soul.

In 1693, she was officially legitimized by her father, with support of the king. She was thereby officially the responsibility of the Condé family, who were expected to arrange a future for her in line with her new rank. There were only two alternatives accepted for an unmarried noblewoman: to marry or to become a nun. The Condé family asked her to become a nun. She refused, and in 1695 married Armand de Madaillan de Lesparre (1652-1738), marquis de Lassay. After the wedding, she declared that she had married only to escape the guardianship of her paternal family, and that she wished to separate from her husband. She separated from her husband and settled in her own house, where she lived openly with her lover, the priest abbé de Chaulieu.
