= Marie Madeleine Agnès de Gontaut =

French aristocrat (1653–1720)

Marie Madeleine Agnès de Gontaut (1653–1720) was a French aristocrat.

== Early life ==
Marie Madeleine was a daughter of General François de Gontaut, Marquis of Biron and Baron of Saint Blancard and his wife Élisabeth de Cossé.

== Personal life ==
She was the unofficial lover of king Louis XIV from 1680 to 1683. In 1688, she married Marquis Louis de Louet de Calvisson, Marquis of Nogaret, and thus ended her court service. After she was widowed in 1690, she returned to court and from 1692 to 1712 was dame du palais in the year Marie Adélaïde of Savoy, whose personal friend she became. Upon Marie Adélaïde's death in 1712, she settled in a convent where she died in 1720.
