= Jeanne de Tignonville =

French noblewoman

Jeanne du Monceau de Tignonville (1555-1596), was a French noblewoman. She was mistress to Henry IV of France in 1576–81. She was known as La petite Tignonville and used her position to enrich herself and her relations. She also had an affair with Pierre de Bourdeille, seigneur de Brantôme.

She was played by Eva Grimaldi in Jean-Charles Tacchella's film Dames Galantes (1990).
