= Louis Claude Cadet de Gassicourt =

French chemist (1731–1799)

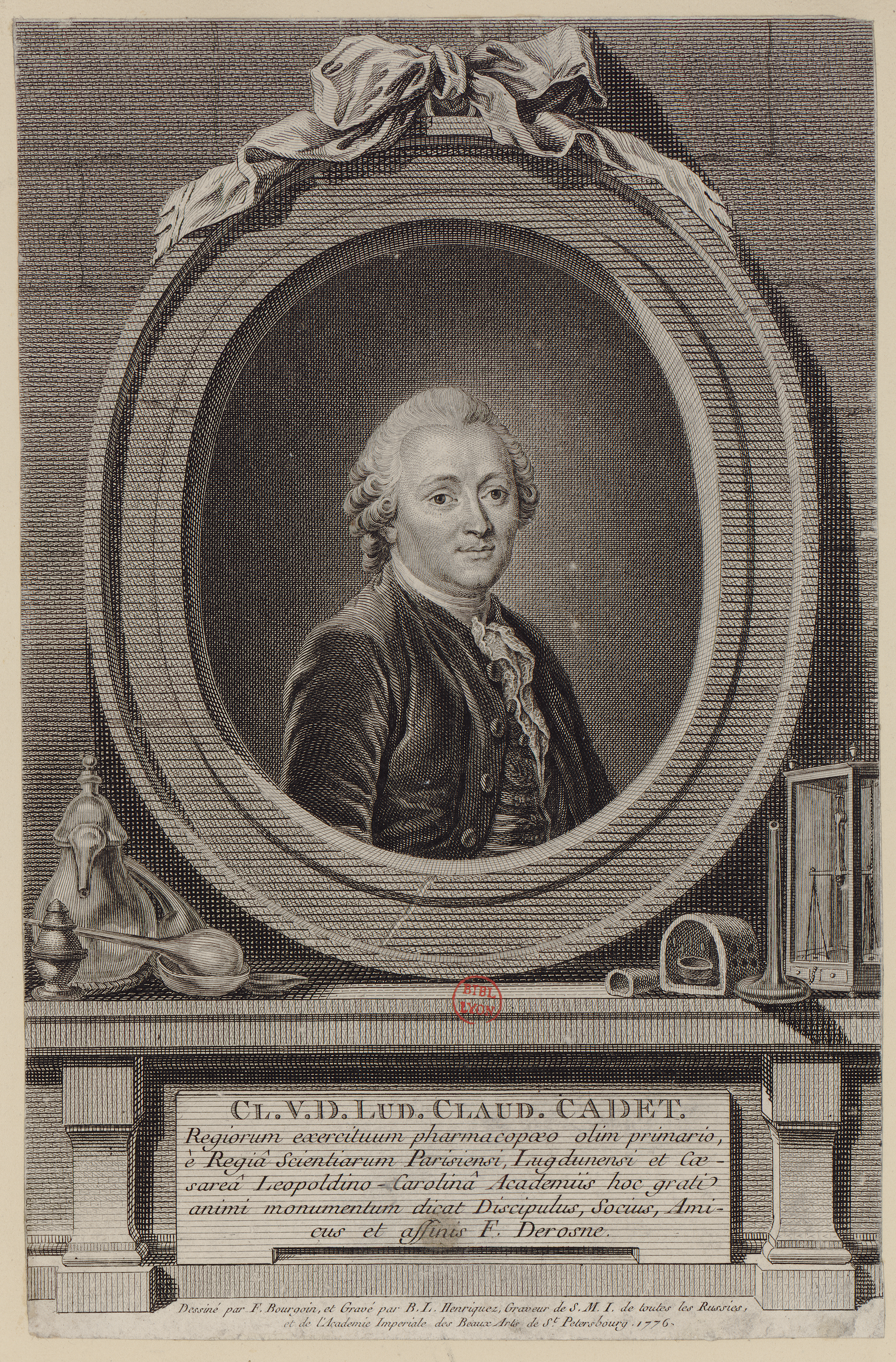
- Louis Claude Cadet de Gassicourt
- Born: 24 July 1731; Paris, France
- Died: 17 October 1799 (aged 68); Paris, France
- Education: Collège des Quatre-Nations
- Known for: Synthesis of the first organometallic compound
- Scientific career
- Fields: Chemist
- Workplaces: Hotel Royal des Invalides in Paris

Louis Claude Cadet de Gassicourt (24 July 1731 – 17 October 1799) was a French chemist who synthesised the first organometalic compound.

He obtained a red liquid by the reaction of potassium acetate with arsenic trioxide. This liquid is known as Cadet's fuming liquid and contains the two compounds cacodyl and cacodyl oxide.

Cadet studied at the Collège des Quatre-Nations and became a pharmacist at the Hotel Royal des Invalides in Paris. He was the brother of the pharmacist Antoine-Alexis Cadet de Vaux.

Marie Thérèse Françoise Boisselet became his wife in 1771, at that time her son, fathered by Louis XV, was two years old. The boy was adopted by Cadet as Charles-Louis Cadet.

Cadet was elected to the American Philosophical Society in 1787.

In 1825, botanist Antoine Laurent Apollinaire Fée circumscribed Gassicurtia which is a genus of lichenized fungi in the family Caliciaceae and named in Cadet de Gassicourt's honor.
