= Marguerite-Catherine Haynault =

Mistress to Louis XV

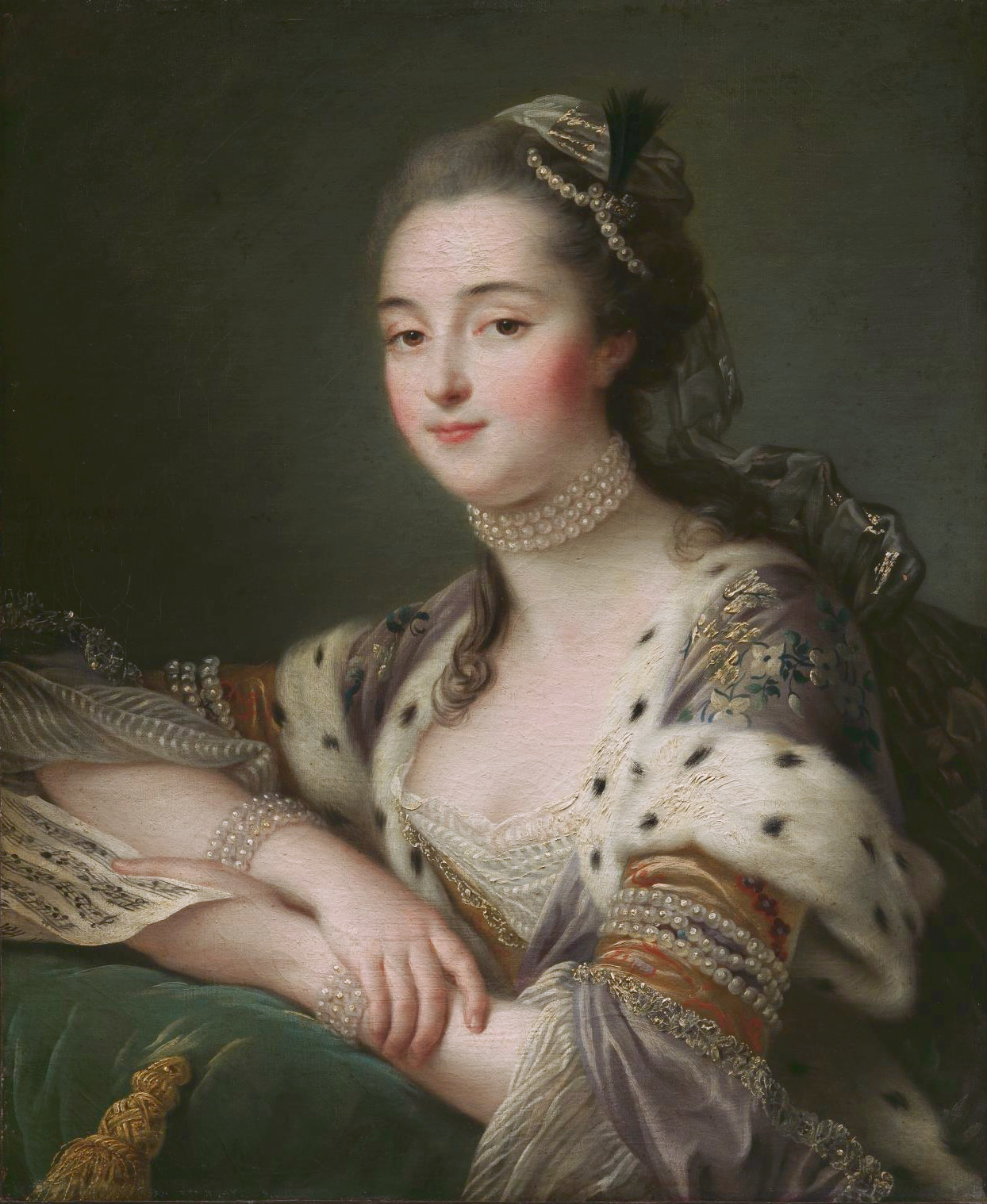
Marguerite Catherine Haynault

Marguerite-Catherine Haynault (1736–1823) was a French noblewoman, mistress to Louis XV from 1759 to 1762. She was the king's Petite maîtresse (unofficial mistress), not his Maîtresse-en-titre (official mistress).

She was born in Paris as the daughter of the tobacco merchant Jean-Baptiste Haynault and Catherine Coupris de La Salle. In 1759, she was recruited to be a petite maîtresse (unofficial mistress) of the king in Parc-aux-Cerfs by Dominique Guillaume Lebel.

She served as the king's lover with Lucie-Madeleine d'Estaing, who lived in the Parc-aux-Cerfs at the same time and alternated with her, one replacing the other in the king's bed during their pregnancies; Louise-Jeanne Tiercelin de La Colleterie was also housed there, while Anne Couppier de Romans had refused and was given her own house. She had two daughters with the king: Agnès-Louise de Montreuil (born 1760) and Anne-Louise de La Réale (born 1762), who were officially registered with two officers as fathers. Her daughters were both taken from her, raised in the convent school Chaillot, and given noble status, dowries and arranged marriages with noblemen as adults.

The king discontinued their relationship in 1762, and she was awarded a pension. In 1766, she married Blaise Arod, Marquis de Montmelas-Saint-Sorlin (d. 1815).

She left France during the French Revolution and lived abroad during the Reign of Terror. After the fall of Maximilien Robespierre, she returned to France, applied to be removed from the list of emigres and reclaimed her property.
