= Lucie Madeleine d'Estaing =

French noblewoman

Lucie-Madeleine d’Estaing (1743–1826), was a French noblewoman, mistress to Louis XV from 1760 to 1763. She was the king's Petite maîtresse (unofficial mistress), not his Maîtresse-en-titre (official mistress).

== Life ==
She was born as the illegitimate daughter of Charles François d'Estaing, vicomte de Ravel, marquis de Sailhant, and Magdeleine Erny de Mirfond. In 1760, she was recruited to be a petite maîtresse (unofficial mistress) of the king in Parc-aux-Cerfs by Dominique Guillaume Lebel.

She served as the king's lover with Marguerite-Catherine Haynault, who lived in the Parc-aux-Cerfs at the same time and alternated with her, one replacing the other in the king's bed during their pregnancies; Louise-Jeanne Tiercelin de La Colleterie was also housed there, while Anne Couppier de Romans had refused and was given her own house. She had two daughters with the king: Agnès-Lucie Auguste (1761-) and Aphrodite-Lucie Auguste (b. 1763-), who were officially registered with 'Lucie Citoyenne' and 'Louis Auguste' as parents. Her daughters were both taken from her, raised in the convent school Chaillot, and given noble status, dowries and arranged marriages with noblemen as adults.

The king discontinued their relationship in 1763. In 1768, she was legitimized by her legitimate half-brother Charles Henri Hector d'Estaing who gave her the estate and income of Ravel, and she married count François de Boysseulh (d. 1807).
