= Antoine de Sartine =

French statesman (1729–1801)

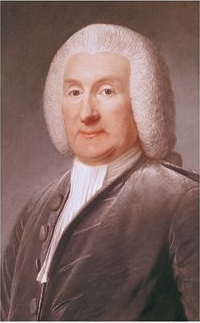

Secretary of State for the Navy
- In office 1774–1780

Lieutenant General of Police
- In office 1759–1774

Personal details
- Born: 12 July 1729 Barcelona
- Died: 7 September 1801 (aged 72)

Antoine Raymond Jean Gualbert Gabriel de Sartine, comte d'Alby (French pronunciation: [ɑ̃twan də saʁtin]; 12 July 1729 – 7 September 1801) was a French statesman who served as Lieutenant General of Police of Paris (1759–1774) during the reign of Louis XV and as Secretary of State for the Navy (1774–1780) under King Louis XVI.

== Origins ==
Antoine de Sartine was born in Barcelona in 1729, the son of Antoine Sartine, a French-born financier who arrived in Spain with the troops of King Philip V of Spain and served as intendente (i.e. governor) of Catalonia from 1726 to 1744. His mother was Catherine White, Countess of Alby (the daughter of Ignatius White, Marquess of Albeville, who served as Secretary of State to James II of England). The title Count of Alby was apparently inherited from his mother, a secondary title to that of Marquis of Albeville, granted to Ignatius White, his father Dominick White, and their descendants, by Leopold I, Holy Roman Emperor, in 1679.

== First years in France ==
After the death of his mother, Antoine de Sartine was sent to France and put under the guidance of Charles Colabeau, businessman and friend of his father. He studied law in Paris. In 1752, he was granted letters of naturalization. The same year, at the age of 23, he became Councilor (i.e. judge) at the Châtelet of Paris, the city's civil and criminal court. In 1755, he bought the office of Criminal Lieutenant, i.e. head, or chief judge, of the Châtelet's criminal branch. As a result of buying this office, he was ennobled and entered the prestigious aristocracy. Eventually, in 1759, he married Marie-Anne Hardy du Plessis, the granddaughter of Charles Colabeau.

By then, he was in favor at the court of Versailles, and so on 21 November 1759, he was appointed Lieutenant General of Police of Paris (i.e. head of the Paris Police). He entered office in December of that year after buying the office of Lieutenant General of Police from his predecessor Bertin for the sum of 175,000 livres (approx. US$850,000 in 2006), which his friend Malesherbes advanced him.

== Lieutenant General of Police of Paris ==
As Lieutenant General of Police, Antoine de Sartine was the real administrator of Paris for 15 years, invested with more powers than the Provost of the Merchants (head of the Paris municipality). Like his predecessors, he was in charge not only of public order, but also of street cleaning and maintenance, food supply, and public health and hygiene.

A skilled administrator, he improved the city's food supply. Along with the Provost of the Merchants de Viarmes, he commissioned the building of a new grain market, the Halle au blé, built between 1765 and 1768, a modern and airy building much admired at the time, which is still standing by Les Halles today and currently known as the Bourse du Commerce.

Street cleaning and lighting were also improved. He set up a brigade of street sweepers and had the first public toilets installed in the streets of Paris. In 1766, after launching an invention contest, he improved street lighting by installing new réverbère lanterns. These were oil lamps with reflectors which were hung above the center of streets and produced a more abundant and stable light than the candle lanterns that had been used for centuries before.

The same year, he founded the Royal Free Drawing School (now the National School of Decorative Arts) which taught drawing skills, free of charge, to the sons of families from the lowest classes of society. The aim was both to train artisans and artists to improve the quality of Parisian luxury goods, industries, and handicrafts, but also to teach poor youths a trade and keep them from roaming the streets and disturbing public order.

For the first time in history, he conducted a survey of the quarries beneath the city, many of which threatened the foundations of buildings. He also ordered fourteen public fountains restored and organized drowning assistance services.

Under his tenure, public order was well maintained in the French capital. He took great care in the recruitment of police commissioners (commissaires de police) to assist him. He is said to have fulfilled his office with justice, humanity, firmness, and vigilance, and was highly respected by everyone.

Among other measures, he subjected the night watchmen to military discipline; he put an end to the abuse of the claque in theatres; he banned gatherings of horn blowers in pubs. In order to suppress underground gambling dives in the city, he opened official gambling houses watched over by his agents and taxed by the Treasury.

His services, in particular the secret police, were the best informed in Europe and served as a model in other countries. All the governments of Europe, Catherine II of Russia, Maria Theresa of Austria, and the Pope, consulted him on the best way to organize police services in their states. He had agents and spies everywhere in the city and abroad, including as far away as in America and in India. Such was his reputation that foreign governments often required his help in searching for fugitives. Once, a minister of Maria Theresa wrote to Sartine asking him to arrest a famous Austrian thief thought to be hiding in Paris. Sartine replied to the minister that the thief was actually in Vienna, and gave the minister the street address where the thief was hiding, and a description of the thief's disguise.

Sartine personally analyzed an enormous correspondence and received his subordinates and commissioners of police at any time of day and night. He was the first to use repentant thieves and reprieved convicts as informants and agents. To courtiers who found this shocking, he used to say: "Pray tell me the name of honest people who would like to do such a job." Sartine was also a man of action, with great presence of mind. On one occasion, having to quell a riot on the Place Maubert, he met the crowd at the head of a company of musketeers and had an officer respectfully remove his hat and tell the crowd: "Gentlemen, we come here in the name of the King, but our orders are to shoot at the scoundrels only. I therefore pray the honest people to leave the square." The crowd disbanded without a gunshot.

Although admired by his contemporaries, he was also criticized for using his highly efficient secret police to spy not only on criminals but also on ordinary citizens. His services opened private letters sent through the mail, which was a frequent practice in Europe at the time, and spied on families. Sartine was thus aware of all sorts of scandals in the city, notably sexual scandals, and he sent daily reports to the king containing saucy and intimate details about courtiers, clerics, and private citizens, which were said to amuse the king and relieve him from the boredom of court life. Furthermore, his political police was known for its efficiency in detecting agitators, dissenters, anticlerical propagandists, and other people perceived as troublemakers, who were imprisoned without trial through the lettres de cachet. Some sources say that there were never more political prisoners at the Bastille and at the fortress of Vincennes than under his tenure.

Britannica declares that he once boasted to Louis XV, "Sire, whenever three people speak to one another in the street, one of them will be mine."

In parallel with his career as Lieutenant General of Police of Paris, Antoine de Sartine became maître des requêtes in December 1759 and conseiller d'État in 1767. He was the director of the Library from 1763 to 1774, succeeding his friend Malesherbes. As such, he was not only in charge of managing the Royal Library (now the National Library of France), but he was also the chief censor in the kingdom, responsible for controlling the book trade and the press. Like his friend Malesherbes, he was a liberal and supported the philosophers of The Enlightenment, in particular Diderot and his Encyclopédie, which he protected against the attacks of the ecclesiastical party.

Antoine de Sartine was close to the party of the minister Choiseul, who had been disgraced by Louis XV in 1770 and ordered to retire to his estate. After the king's death in May 1774, Choiseul was allowed to return to Paris and his party regained favor at court. Thus, on August 24 of the same year, Sartine was appointed Secretary of State for the Navy (with the honorific rank of Minister of State in 1775) and left his office of Lieutenant General of Police to his protégé Lenoir.

== Secretary of State for the Navy ==
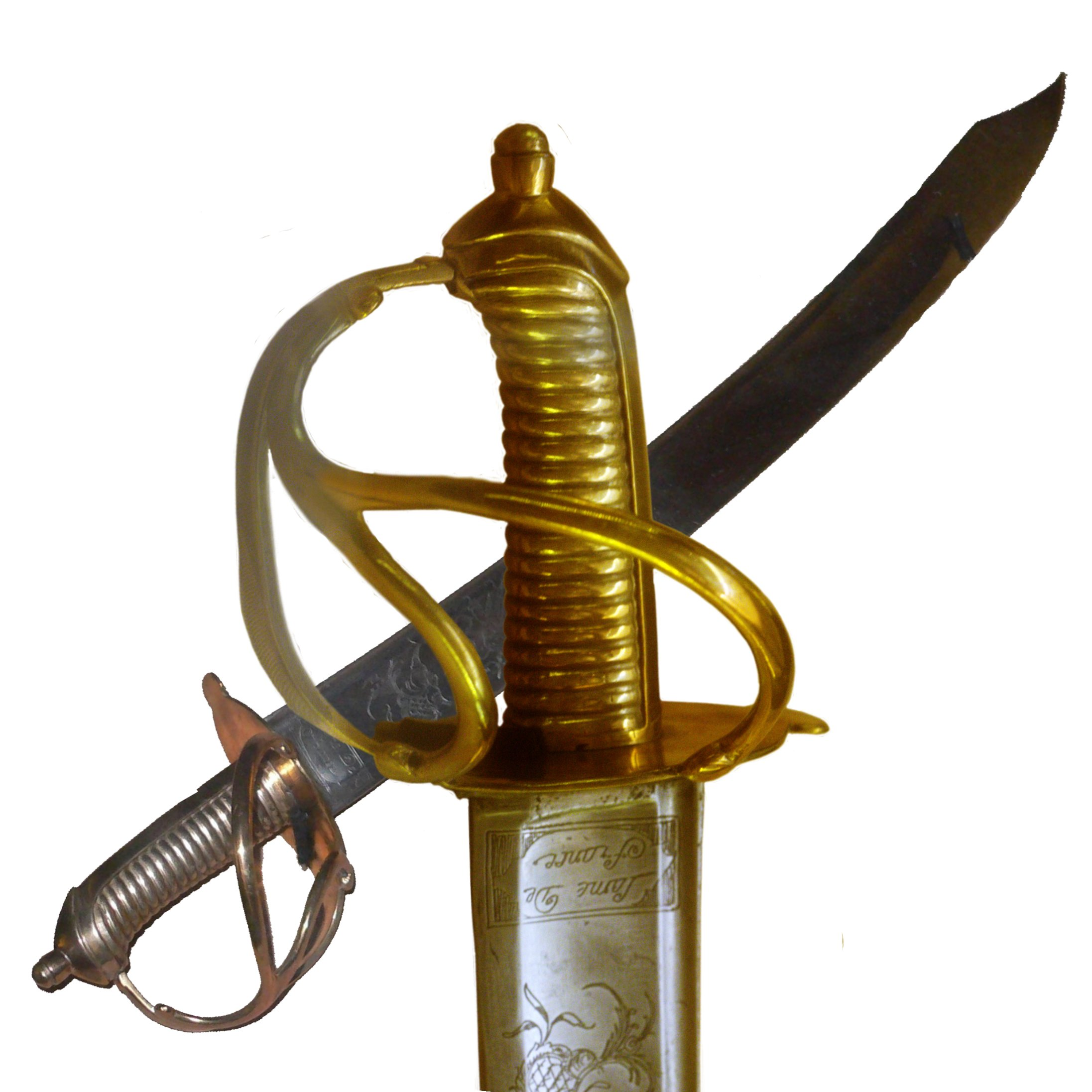
Navy officer sabre, model 1779, nicknamed "Sartine'.

Antoine de Sartine inherited a strong French Navy, resurrected by Choiseul after the disasters of the Seven Years' War (in which France had lost Canada, Louisiana, and India); a resurrected French Navy which would later play a major role in France's victory in the American Revolutionary War. In the ministry, Sartine surrounded himself with able men, such as the comte de Fleurieu. He modernized and rationalized the French Navy. By seven decrees (September 27, 1776), he gave naval officers the high hand over French ports and naval dockyards, which were put under the direction of the comte de Fleurieu. He also reorganized the corps of naval artillery and marine infantry. In 1775, after his predecessor's aborted attempt to create a Royal Marine School in Le Havre, he re-established the Companies of Marine Guards, naval schools training officers, whose access was strictly limited to children of the aristocracy.

As conflict with Britain was looming on the horizon, he increased shipbuilding budgets fourfold, enabling large-scale shipbuilding when France entered the American War of Independence at the beginning of 1778. In the space of only one year, nine ships-of-the-line were built in the French shipyards. Sartine also initiated the building of the long breakwater which protects the port of Cherbourg and commissioned the construction of dry docks in Brest, Rochefort, Lorient, and Toulon. Particularly interested in foundries, he created the naval foundry of Indret near Nantes (now a unit of Naval Group specialized in conventional and nuclear propulsion). In these critical times, he fought successfully against insubordination in the Navy, notably by publishing a regulation in 1780 dealing with hygiene on board the vessels of the fleet and with marine crew health issues. Drawing from his police experience, he also used his spy network during the conflict.

The budget deficit, which was aggravated by France's participation in the War of American Independence, led to conflict between the finance minister, Necker, who sought to limit expenditures, and Sartine, who wanted to expand the French Navy even further. Necker accused Sartine of exceeding the budget allocated to the Navy by 20 million livres (approx. US$100 million in 2006). Necker complained sharply to King Louis XVI that this overrun threatened an already almost bankrupt State. Eventually, the king dismissed Sartine on 14 October 1780 and replaced him with the marquis de Castries. Sartine, however, was dismissed with honors: he received a reward of 150,000 livres (approx. US$700,000) for his services, and he was granted a 70,000 livres yearly pension.

Antoine de Sartine tried to justify his actions as minister in a vitriolic pamphlet against Necker, whom he accused of having "sold himself" to the British, but he didn't win over the public and was the victim of numerous puns and epigrams such as this one:

I swept Paris with extreme care,
And, wishing to sweep the English from the seas,
I sold my broom so dearly
That I was swept away myself.

== Later years ==
Sartine lived in retirement in Paris until the start of the French Revolution. Hated by the revolutionary crowds for his tenure as Lieutenant General of Police and his use of the lettres de cachet to imprison people without trial, and attacked by Manuel in his La Police de Paris dévoilée ("The Paris Police Uncovered"), he decided to leave France shortly after the Storming of the Bastille on July 14, 1789, which probably saved his life. His son Charles Marie Antoine de Sartine, born in 1760, who was maître des requêtes from the age of 20 until 1791 and chose to stay in France, was arrested in 1794, sentenced to death by the Revolutionary Tribunal, and guillotined on June 17 of that year along with his 19-year-old wife and his mother-in-law, the comtesse de Sainte-Amaranthe.

Sartine took refuge in Barcelona, where he had spent his childhood. There, he was active among émigré circles. Around 1797, he retired to Tarragona, where he was a member of the enlightened circle of Archbishop Francesc Armanyà. He died in Tarragona in 1801 at 72 without having returned to France.

Political offices
Preceded by Anne Robert Jacques Turgot	Secretaries of State for the Navy; 24 August 1774 - 13 October 1780	Succeeded by Charles Eugène Gabriel de La Croix, marquis de Castries
