= Parc-aux-Cerfs =

House in the park of the Palace of Versailles

Coordinates: 48.79847°N 2.12488°E

A Parc-aux-Cerfs ([paʁk.o.sɛʁ]; "park of stags") is the name given to an urban area of Versailles, France that was built during the time of Louis XV. The area now corresponds to the Saint-Louis district near the former Royal château. It has numerous 18th century houses and small dwellings.

Although the name was originally meant a deer park, it became notoriously associated with a house owned by Louis XV in which he maintained a brothel of secret mistresses. They would be brought to the palace when required by the King.

== Toponym ==
In France, Parc-aux-Cerfs referred to clearings that provided hunting fields for the French aristocracy in the Ancien régime prior to the French Revolution.

== Development ==
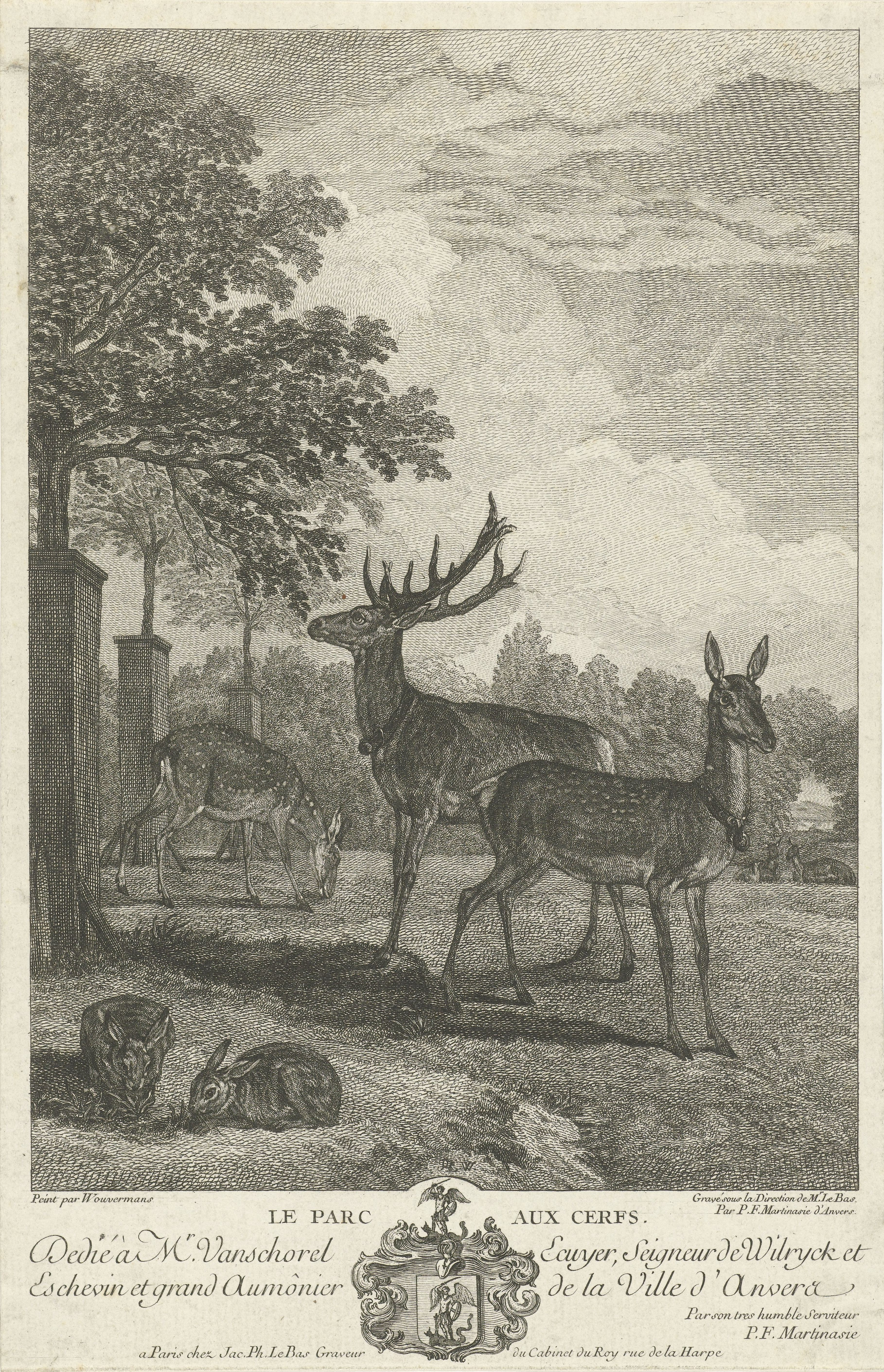
An 18th-century engraving of a traditional Parc-aux-Cerfs

The name of area comes from the enclosed deer park that existed in the time of Louis XIII. As he liked to hunt at Versailles, he built a hunting lodge and later a small castle in the area. However, following the grand development of the Palace of Versailles under Louis XIV, its size resulted in the need for new housing for royal staff, retainers and workers. The deer park was broken up and sold in lots for urbanisation. Most of the building work was completed during the reign of Louis XV.

== Mistress property ==
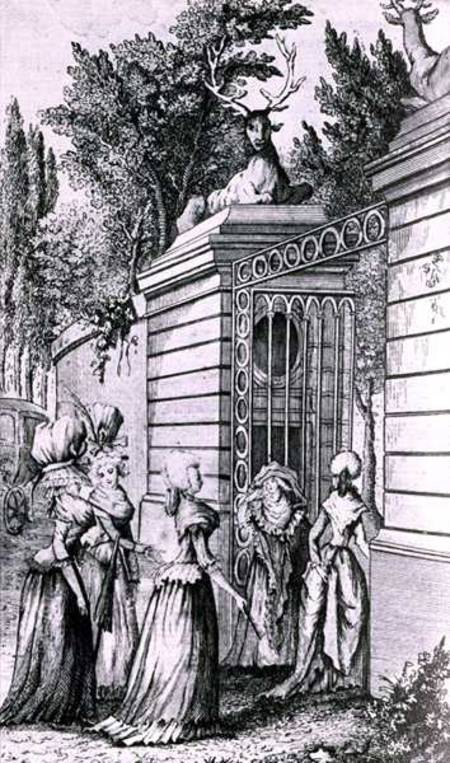
A 19th-century engraving of women being led into the Parc-aux-Cerfs at Versailles.

Louis XV owned a small and discreet house in the area where he kept his secret mistresses. The property was under the supervision of the King's official mistress, Madame de Pompadour, who remained close to him though she no longer had a physical relationship with him. However some biographers of Madame de Pompadour claim "[she] had nothing whatever to do with it". The mistresses were recruited by Dominique Guillaume Lebel, the King's valet de chambre.

Between 1752 and 1768, many women and girls lived at the house, sometimes together; many of whom have never been identified. Among the known mistresses of the Louis XV who stayed at the Parc-aux-Cerfs, these included 14-year-old Marie-Louise O'Murphy (in 1752–1755) with her sister Brigitte O'Murphy (1755–1757); Jeanne-Marguerite de Niquet "Mme Véron de Séranne" (1754); Marie Louise de Marny, Madame de Giambone (1758); Marguerite-Catherine Haynault (1759–1762); Lucie-Madeleine d'Estaing (1760–1763); Louise-Jeanne de Tiercelin de La Colleterie (1762–1765); Marie-Thérèse Boisselet (1768); Jeanne-Marguerite Salvetat "Madame Mars" (1768) and, finally Madame du Barry (1768). The house was sold in 1771.
