= Maîtresse-en-titre =

Title used for the chief royal mistress of the King of France

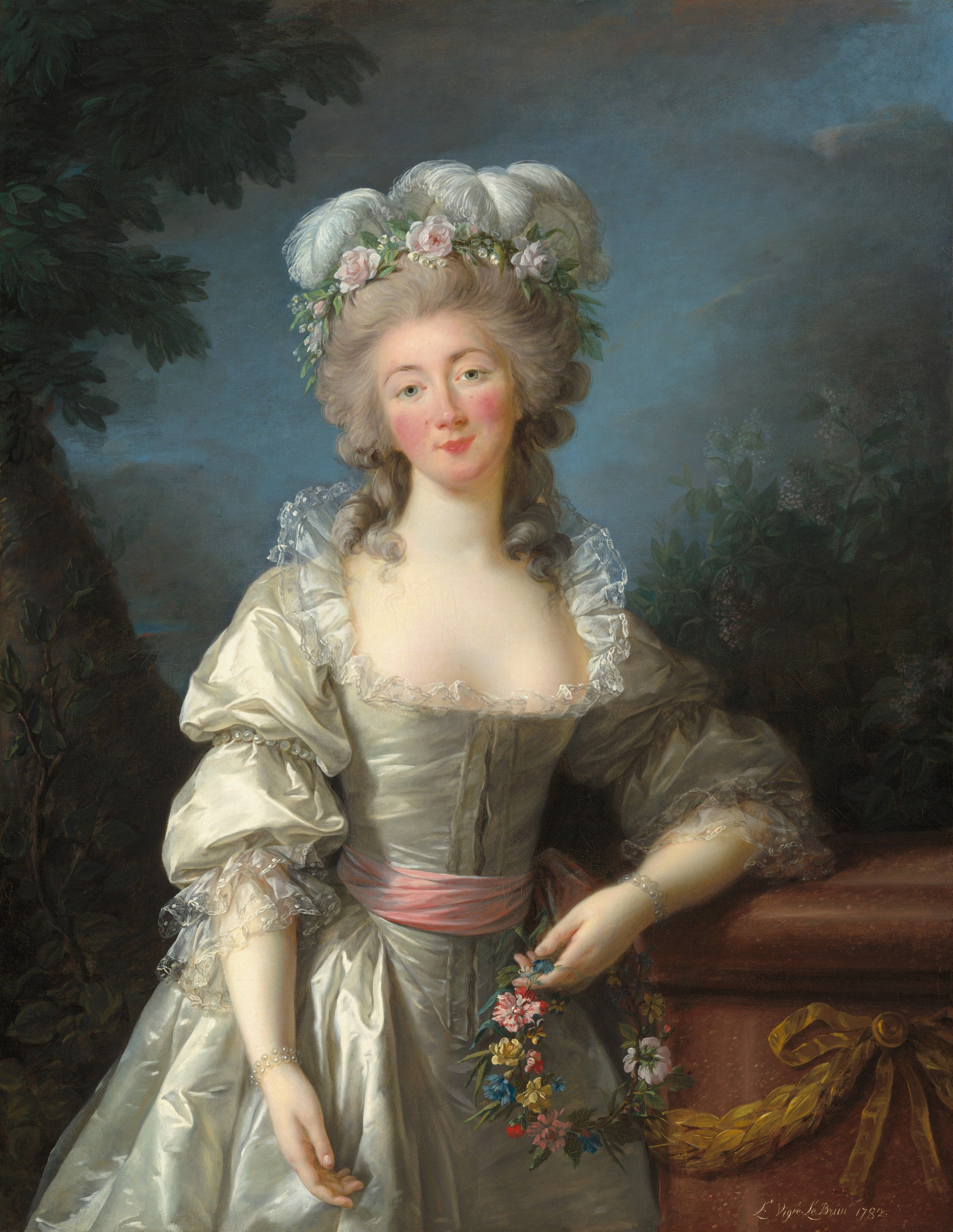
Madame du Barry became a Maîtresse-en-titre despite her "low birth", which was considered scandalous.

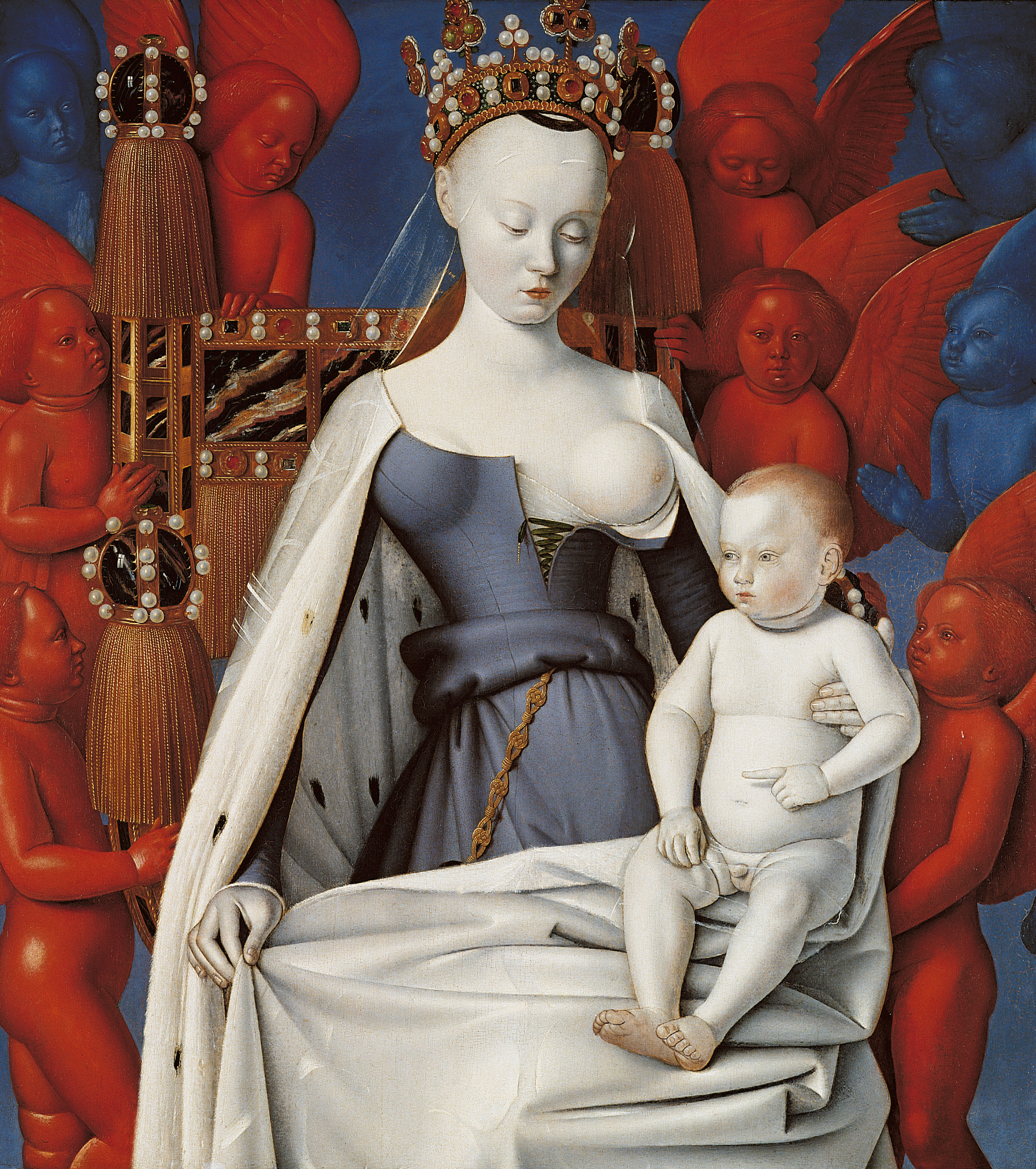
Agnès Sorel

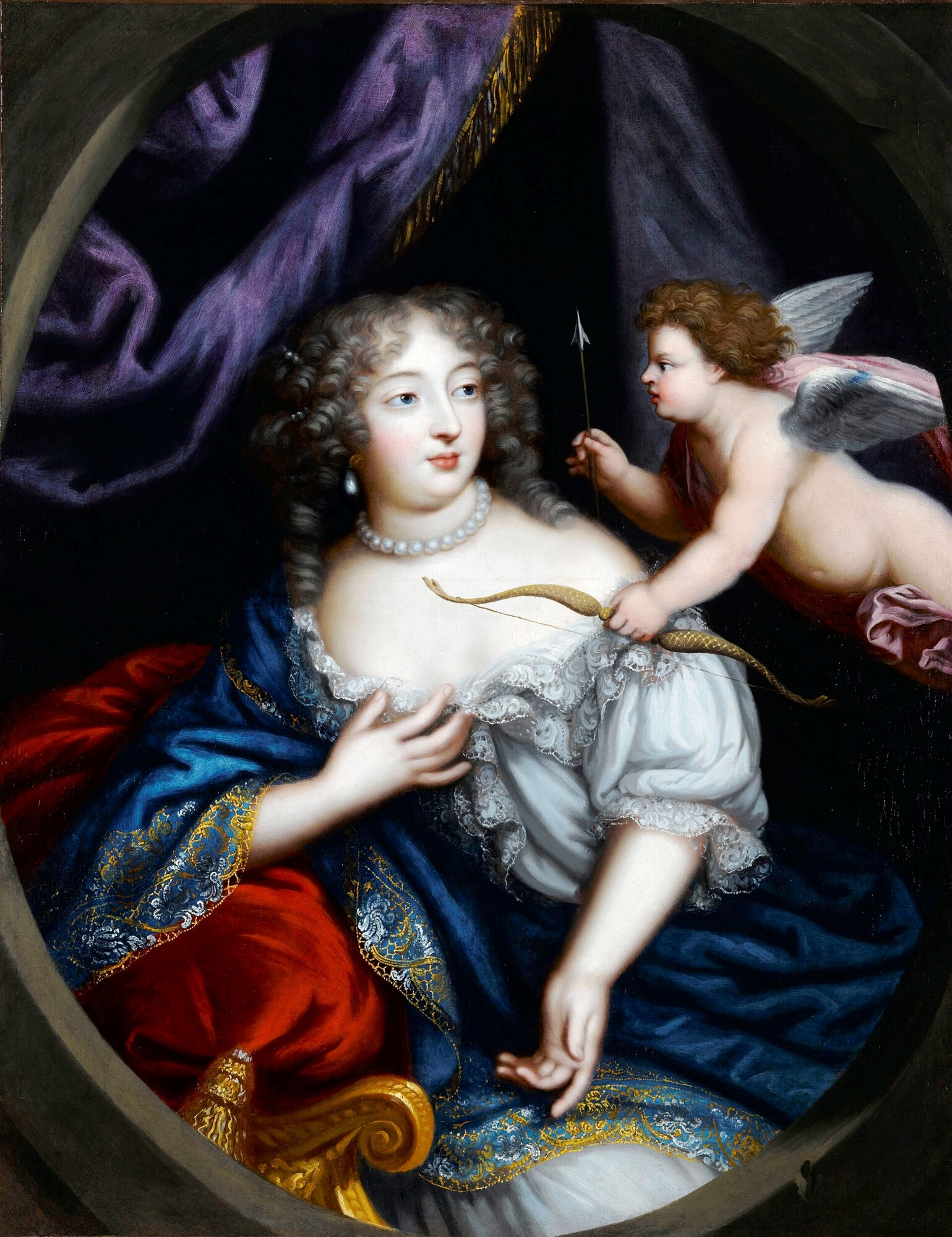
Françoise-Athénaïs, marquise de Montespan

Madame de Pompadour

The maîtresse-en-titre (French: [mɛtʁɛs ɑ̃ titʁ]) was the official royal mistress of the King of France. The title was vaguely defined and used in the Middle Ages but finally became an acknowledged, if informal, position during the reign of Henry IV (r. 1589–1610), and continued through the reign of Louis XV (r. 1715–1774). It was a semi-official position which came with its own apartments, estates and a title if the woman did not have any.

Some individuals having this position acquired significant power and more influence than the Queen of France, as some mistresses were known to advise the King of France in state affairs, broker favors for clients, elevate others in social mobility, forge alliances and negotiate with foreign diplomats.

In contrast, the title petite maîtresse was the title of a mistress who was not officially acknowledged.

== French royal mistresses with the position of Maîtresse-en-titre ==
While the king may have had many mistresses, there was normally only one official Maîtresse-en-titre. Below are examples of those with this position. For a full list of all the mistresses of a French king, regardless of their position as official or not, please see List of French royal mistresses.

Charles V (1338 – 1380)

- Biette de Cassinel (c. 1340 – c. 1380)

Charles VI (1368 – 1422)

- Odette de Champdivers (c. 1384–1424)

Charles VII (1403 – 1461)

- Agnès Sorel (c. 1422–1450)
- Antoinette de Maignelais (c. 1430 – c. 1461)

Louis XI (1423 – 1483)

- Phélise Regnard (1424–1474)
- Marguerite de Sassenage (c. 1449–1471)

Francis I (1494 – 1547)

- Françoise de Foix (1495–1537), countess of Châteaubriant
- Anne de Pisseleu d'Heilly (1508–1580), duchess of Étampes

Henry II (1519 – 1559)

- Diane de Poitiers (1499–1566)

Henry III (1551 – 1589)

- Louise de La Béraudière du Rouhet (1530–1611)
- Renée de Rieux de Châteauneuf (fl. 16th C.)
- Marie of Cleves, Princess of Condé (1553–1574)

Henry IV (1553 – 1610)

- Diane d'Andoins "La Belle Corisandre" (1554–1621)
- Françoise de Montmorency (1562–1614)
- Esther Imbert (1570 – c. 1593)
- Antoinette de Pons (1570–1632)
- Gabrielle d'Estrées (c. 1571–1599)
- Catherine Henriette de Balzac d'Entragues (1579–1633), marquise de Verneuil
- Jacqueline de Bueil (c. 1580–1651)
- Charlotte des Essarts (c. 1580–1651)

Louis XIV (1638 – 1715)

- Louise Françoise de la Baume le Blanc de la Vallière (1644–1710), duchesse de la Vallière and duchesse de Vaujours
- Françoise-Athénaïs de Rochechouart de Mortemart, marquise de Montespan (1640–1707)
- Françoise d'Aubigné, marquise de Maintenon (1635–1719), married the King in 1683
- Isabelle de Ludres (1647–1722)
- Marie Angélique de Scoraille de Roussille (1661–1681), duchess of Fontanges

Louis XV (1710 – 1774)

- Louise Julie de Mailly (1710–1751), comtesse de Mailly
- Pauline-Félicité de Mailly (1712–1741), marquise de Vintimille
- Diane-Adélaïde de Mailly (1713–1760), duchess de Lauraguais
- Marie-Anne de Mailly (1717–1744), duchess de Châteauroux
- Jeanne-Antoinette Poisson (better known as Madame de Pompadour) (1721–1764), marquise de Pompadour
- Marie-Jeanne Bécu (better known as Madame du Barry) (1743–1793), comtesse de Barry

Louis XVIII (1755 – 1824)

- Zoé Talon, comtesse du Cayla (1785–1852)

== See also ==
- Henry IV of France's wives and mistresses
- Favourite
