= Augustin-Joseph de Mailly =

Marshal of France (1707–1794)

Augustin Joseph de Mailly
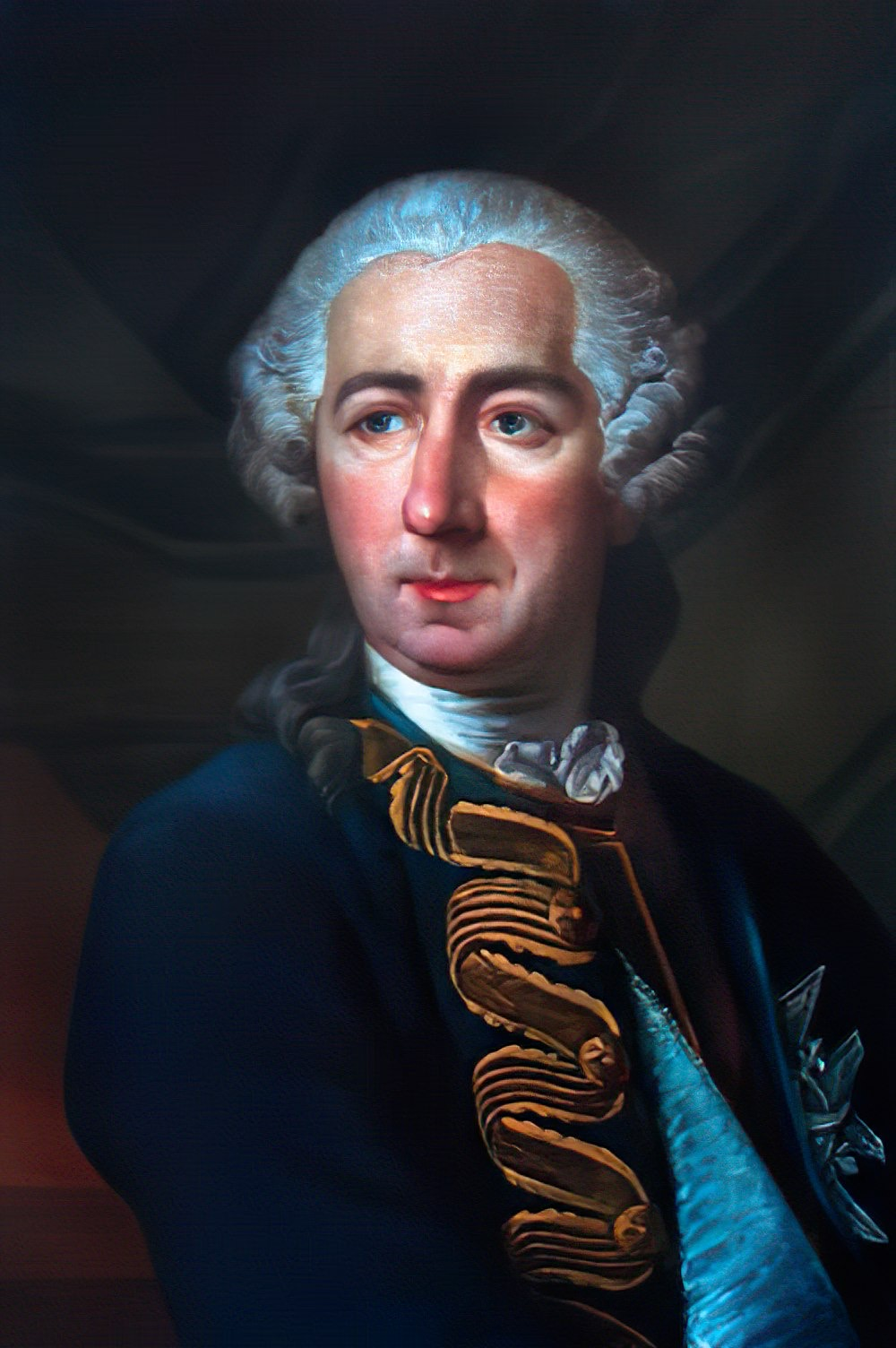
- Born: 5 April 1707; Villaines-sous-Lucé, France
- Died: 25 March 1794 (aged 86); Arras, First French Republic
- Relatives: House of Mailly
- Military career
- Allegiance: Kingdom of France
- Branch: Maison militaire du roi de France
- Service years: 1726–1792
- Rank: Marshal of France
- Conflicts: War of the Polish Succession; Siege of Kehl (1733); War of the Austrian Succession; Battle of Piacenza; Seven Years' War; Battle of Hastenbeck; Battle of Rosbach; Insurrection of 10 August 1792
- Awards: Cross of Saint-Louis; Collar of the Grand Cross of Malta; Knight of the orders of the king (1776); Order of Saint-Lazare
- Other work: Lieutenant général of Roussillon; Gouvernor of Abbeville, Sénéchal and Grand bailli of Ponthieu

Augustin-Joseph de Mailly (5 April 1707 – 25 March 1794) was a French general, governor, and nobleman. He was one of the oldest persons to be guillotined during the French Revolution. De Mailly was marquis d'Haucourt and baron of Saint-Amand. In disgrace, he was distanced from the court and therefore remained a lieutenant-Général for a very long time, before becoming commander in chief in Roussillon, where he was the originator of great building works and the renewal of the university and played a large rôle in French Freemasonry.

Made a chevalier du Saint-Esprit on 26 May 1776, he was made marshal of France on 13 June 1783 and due to his age was able to be governor of Abbeville, sénéchal and Grand bailli of Ponthieu not far from his lands and château. This Mailly, who fought in many battles of the wars of Louis XV, received from Louis XVI in 1790 command of one of the four armies decreed by the National Assembly (14th and 15th military divisions). This was a difficult task and he resigned on 22 June, when he learned of the king's flight to Varennes. On 10 August 1792, despite his old age, he fought on the side of the threatened French monarchy. Escaping the carnage that followed the capture of the palais des Tuileries and the September massacres, he was arrested in his château, then guillotined in 1794 at Arras, aged 86 – on the scaffold he cried "I remain faithful to my king, as my ancestors have always been".

== Family ==
Mailly shield

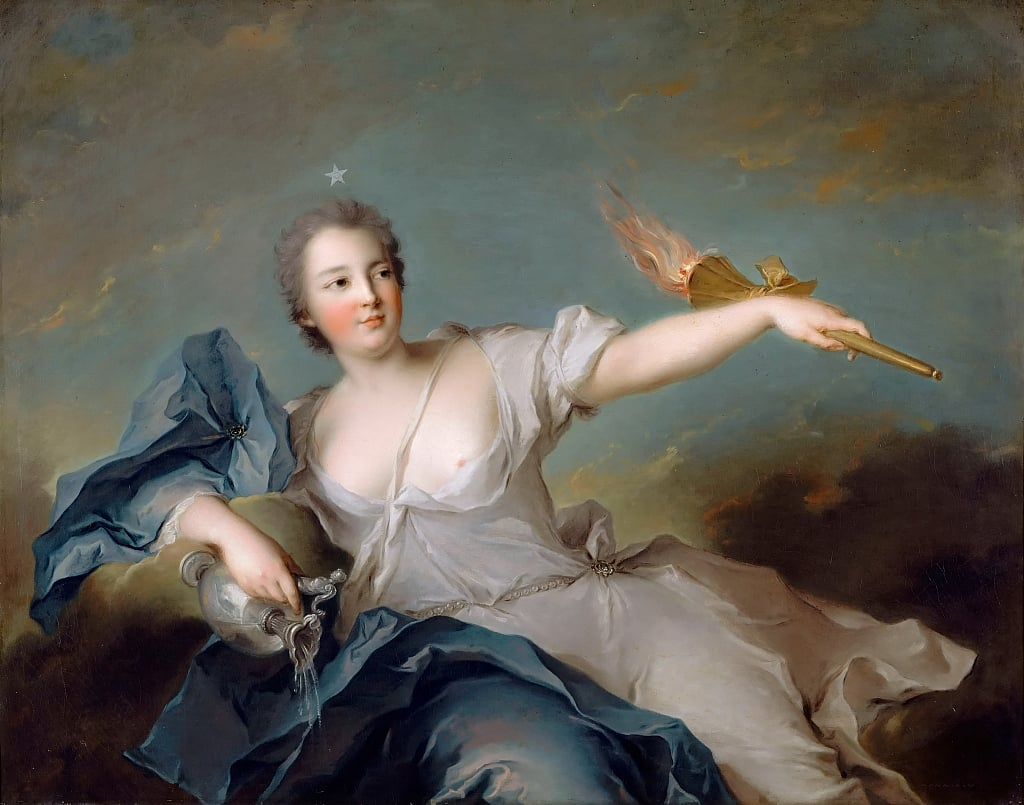
Marie-Anne de Mailly-Nesle, his cousin

== Life ==
In January 1744, he inherited the title of count of Mailly following the death of his cousin Louis de Mailly (1723–1743). At first a musketeer (1726), he served in the gendarmerie (1733–1764) before rising rapidly through the ranks – brigadier on 20 February 1743, maréchal de camp on 1 May 1745, lieutenant-général on 10 May 1748, inspector general of cavalry and dragoons on 21 May 1749, and finally director-general of camps and armies.

On 2 October 1753, Marshal de Noailles, who quarreled with Mailly, succeeded in having him dismissed from his command. In November 1753, Jean-Baptiste de Machault d'Arnouville persuaded Louis XV to exile Mailly. On 1 March 1754, the king rebuked the count of Mailly d'Haucourt for having spread too much his memory that René Louis de Voyer de Paulmy d'Argenson considers apologetic. Mailly must return to his land. His mistress, the Marquise de Blanes and her husband, spoke out against the government. They were also outlawed. Mailly's disgrace did not last long, as he was sent to Spain to compliment the Infanta Marie-Thérèse-Raphaëlle de Bourbon on behalf of the king.

=== Port-Vendres ===
Louis XVI, true restorer of the French war and commercial navy, entrusted General de Mailly with the installation of a powerful and fortified port which would finally be able to ensure regular traffic with the whole of Europe, from Spain to Sweden, Scotland to Italy, the Catalan coast to the East, to the Barbary ports, and even as far away as India and the Americas. Mailly restructured Port-Vendres, which he wanted like Perpignan, to be the ideal representation of a Masonic city. He built a deep port there, sheltered from the winds. In addition to the modern port, in fifteen years (1770 - 1785), he completed the city, outlines and pierces a few small streets, builds new dwellings on a uniform plan, corrects alignments, builds quays and convenient landing stages. To mark the rebirth of Port-Vendres with a symbol, Louis XVI allowed the province to erect to his glory the first monument erected in France in his honor, the obelisk of Port-Vendres. In 1775 he reinforced the fortifications at the entrance to the port of Port-Vendresby building the Mailly Redoubt opposite the Fanal Redoubt, a fortress built by the Marquis de Vauban between 1673 and 1700 to defend the port.

=== 10 August 1792 ===
Marshal de Mailly refused to emigrate; the idea of the king being abandoned in Paris without the clergy and nobility to him was a revolting absurdity. In 1790, Louis XVI gave him command of one of four armies decreed by the National Assembly and that of the 14^{th} and 15th military divisions. The assembly demanded a civic oath, and Marshal de Mailly resigned.

On 9 August, when he learned of the dangers surrounding the royal family, he went to the Tuileries Palace. He was entrusted by the King with the command of the troops who would defend the Tuileries the next day, 10 August 1792. During the attack, the defense was swept away. Mailly escaped the massacre and received help to escape.

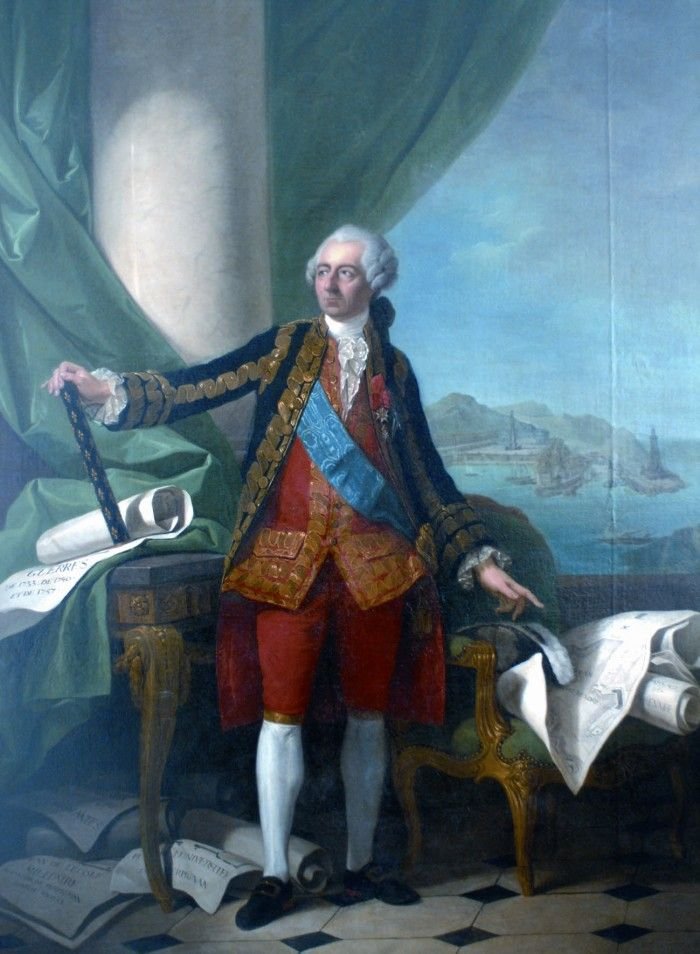
de Mailly

=== Arrest and execution ===
On 25 March 1794, de Mailly was executed by guillotine, at the time of his execution he was the oldest person to be executed.

== Works ==
- Histoire de la campagne de l’année 1734 en Allemagne, commandée par le maréchal de Berwick, et après sa mort par le maréchal d'Asfeld. Ecrite par les officiers de l'état-major avec des Notes des différent partis qui la divisoient, et conservée dans les portefeuilles du comte de Mailly, mestre de camp de cavalerie dans cette année et depuis maréchal de France.
- Lettre de M. le maréchal de Mailly au roi, sur l'administration intérieure qu'il a remplie en Roussillon, 1790, Notice n° : FRBNF36385059
- Souvenirs du maréchal de Mailly, Le Mans, impr. de Leguicheux, 1895. Gr. in-8 ̊ (255 x 165), 111 p. Acq. 293637 –VIIIe, Notice n° : FRBNF32409343

== Notes ==
=== Bibliography ===
- Le Maréchal de Mailly, portrait d’un homme des Lumières, Colloque Le siècle des Lumières en Roussillon, Archives Départementales des Pyrénées-Orientales – Université de Perpignan, 3 décembre 2004.
- Duval, Jean-Yves, Le prix du sang bleu : Joseph-Augustin de Mailly, 1708–1794 / Jean-Yves Duval. – Paris : les Éd. le Sémaphore, 2000
