= Armande Félice de La Porte Mazarin =

French noblewoman, courtier and duelist

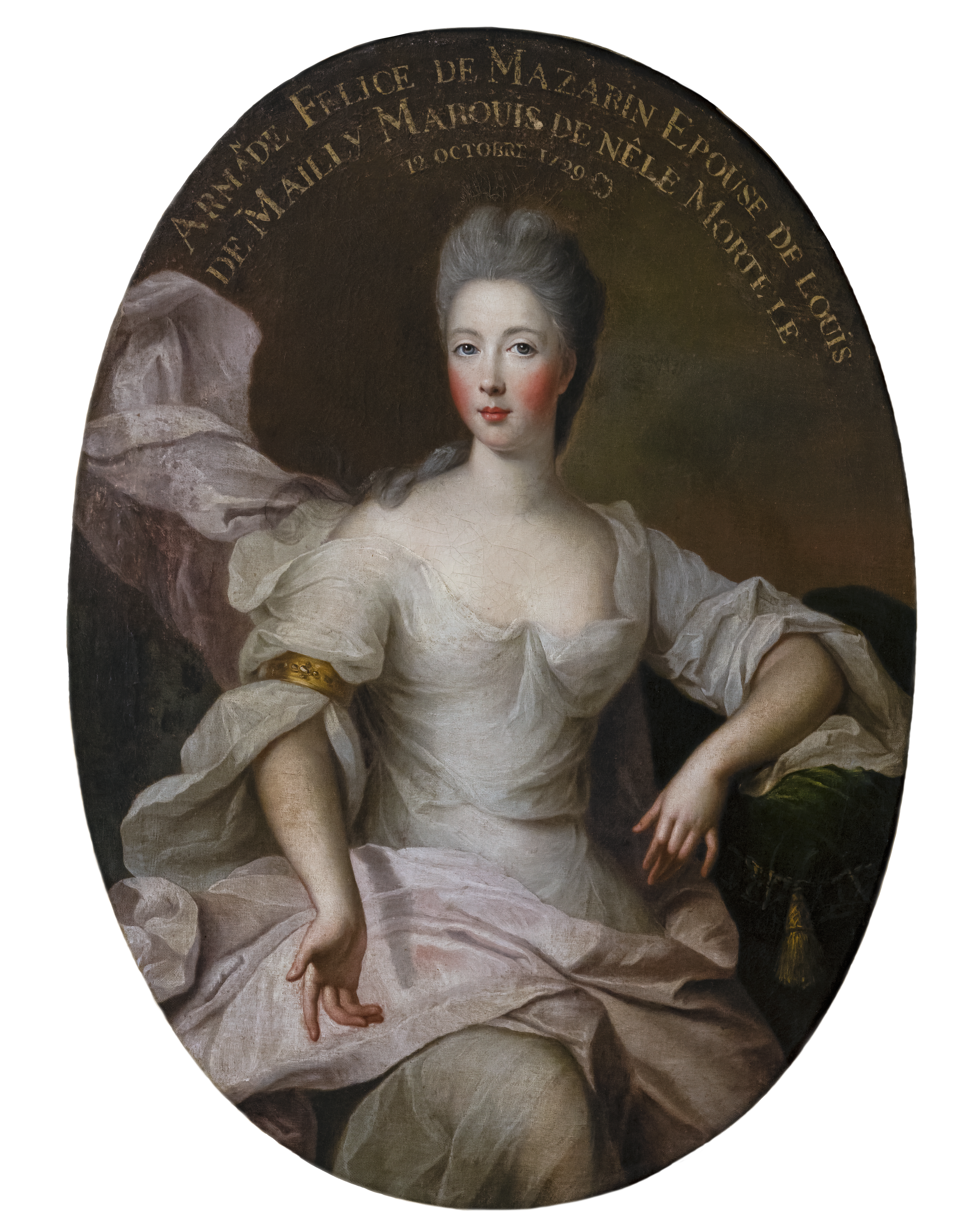
Pierre Gobert - Portrait de Armande Felice de Mazarin

Armande Félice de La Porte Mazarin, Marquise de Nesle (1691–1729), was a French noblewoman, courtier and duelist. She is known for the famous duel she fought over her lover with another woman, for being a figure of scandal during the Regency period, and for being the mother of the Nesle sisters, mistresses to Louis XV.

== Life ==
She was born to Charlotte Félice Armande de Durfort-Duras and Paul Jules de La Porte, Duke de La Meilleraye, Duke de Mazarin. Paul Jules was the son of Hortense Mancini, Duchess de Mazarin, a one-time mistress of Charles II. In 1709, she married Louis de Mailly, Marquis de Nesle et de Mailly, Prince d'Orange (1689–1767).

Her spouse reportedly "wasted his substance on actresses and the capacious requirements of Court life".

She was a famous profile of the Régence and belonged to the aristocrats associated with the debaucheries during the ill-reputed period. She was the lover of Armand de Vignerot du Plessis, Duke de Richelieu, who was also the lover of Vicomtesse de Polignac. Informed that she was not the only lover of Richelieu, she challenged her rival Vicomtesse de Polignac to a duel. On 10 September 1718, the famous duel took place, ending in Armande Félice being injured in the shoulder with a pistol. Richelieu commented on the duel with the words that both ladies had fought well for him, and thus he refused to choose between them.

She discontinued the relationship with Richelieu, and became the lover of Louis Henri, Duke of Bourbon, with whom she had a daughter, Henriette de Bourbon-Condé (1725–1780), who in 1740 was married to Jean Roger de Laguiche, marquis de Laguiche, comte de Sivignon.

In 1725, she was one of the officials appointed to the Household of the new queen, Marie Leszczyńska, due to her rank and her connections to Louis Henri, Duke of Bourbon and Madame de Prie. She served as Dame du Palais to the queen until her death in 1729 and was succeeded in her office by her eldest daughter Louise Julie de Mailly.

== Issue ==
With Louis de Mailly, marquis de Nesle et de Mailly, Prince d'Orange:

- Louise Julie de Mailly, Mademoiselle de Mailly, comtesse de Mailly (1710–1751),
- Pauline Félicité de Mailly, Mademoiselle de Nesle, marquise de Vintimille (1712–1741),
- Diane Adélaïde de Mailly, Mademoiselle de Montcavrel, duchesse de Lauraguais (1714–1769),
- Hortense Félicité de Mailly, Mademoiselle de Chalon, marquise de Flavacourt (1715–1799).
- Marie Anne de Mailly, Mademoiselle de Monchy, marquise de La Tournelle, duchesse de Châteauroux (1717–1744).

With Louis Henri, Duke of Bourbon:

- Henriette de Bourbon (1725–1780), Mademoiselle de Verneuil, who married Jean, marquis de Laguiche, (1719–1770) in 1740.
