= Charles de Vintimille =

Illegitimate son of Louis XV

- Marquis du Luc
- Born: 2 September 1741
- Died: 24 February 1814 (aged 72)
- Spouse: Adélaïde de Castellane (m. 1764)
- Issue: 3
- Father: Louis XV
- Mother: Pauline Félicité de Mailly-Nesle

Charles de Vintimille (2 September 1741 – 24 February 1814), marquis du Luc, was a French aristocrat and governor. He was the illegitimate son of Pauline Félicité de Mailly and purportedly of King Louis XV, and was known as Demi-Louis ('Little Louis') because of his visual resemblance to his alleged biological father Louis XV.

== Life ==
After the death of his mother, Charles de Vintimille was raised by his aunt Louise Julie de Mailly until the baptism of 19 December 1742, in the castle of the legitimate father Jean Baptiste de Vintimille, in Savigny-sur-Orge. The king never paid him any personal attention.

His father's mistress Madame de Pompadour wished to arrange a marriage between Charles de Vintimille and her daughter Alexandrine Le Normant d'Étiolles, but the king would not allow it.

He made a career in the royal regiment in Corsica, where he became a captain, lieutenant and governor of Porquerolles (1759), and later a Maréchal de camp (1780) and a knight of the Order of Saint Louis. He married Adélaïde de Castellane (1746-1770) in 1764, with whom he had three children.

His descendants include Marie-Joseph Charles des Acres de L'Aigle, whose served 27 years as mayor of Rethondes.
