= De Mailly =

Coat of arms of de Mailly family

The House of Mailly is an ancient and powerful the Burgundian royal and ducal house of the Merovingians and French noble house, originated from Picardy, France. Members of the family held many important political, ecclesiastical and military positions during the Kingdom of France. They also bore and bear the titles of Duke, Marquis, Count and Prince of Orange.

== Notable members ==
- Augustin-Joseph de Mailly (1708–1794), French general
- Diane Adélaïde de Mailly (1713–1769), French aristocrat
- François de Mailly (1658–1721), French cardinal
- Jean de Mailly, French Dominican chronicler
- Louise Julie de Mailly (1710–1751), French aristocrat
- Marie Anne de Mailly (1717–1744), French aristocrat
- Pauline Félicité de Mailly (1712–1741), French aristocrat
