= Isabelle de Ludres =

French lady-in-waiting (1647–1726)

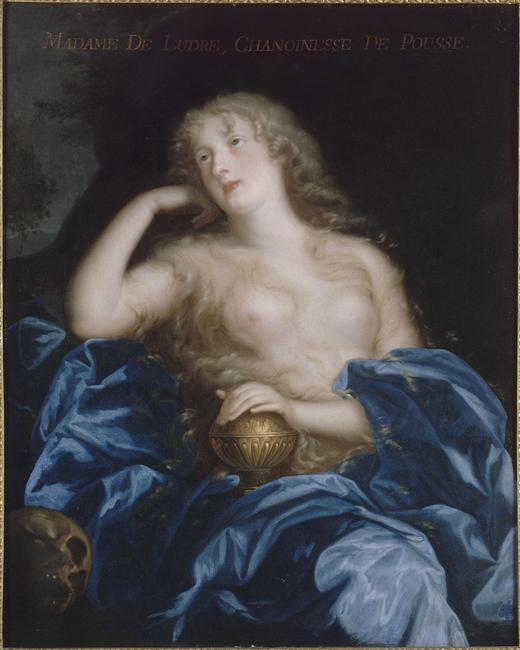
- Ludres portrayed as Mary Magdalene, circa 1677
- Born: Marie-Élisabeth de Ludres; 1647; Ludres, Duchy of Lorraine
- Died: January 28, 1726 (aged 79); Nancy, Duchy of Lorraine
- Education: Chapitre des dames nobles de Poussay
- Known for: Mistress of Louis XIV
- Title: Marquess of Ludres
- Parent(s): Jean de Ludres; Claude des Salles

Marie-Élisabeth "Isabelle" de Ludres, Marquess of Ludres (1647 – 28 January 1726) was a French noblewoman and lady-in-waiting, known for being the mistress of Louis XIV, King of France between 1675 and 1676.

== Early life ==
Marie-Élisabeth de Ludres was born in 1647 in Ludres, Duchy of Lorraine as the daughter of Jean de Ludres and his wife, born Claude des Salles. She was sent to the Chapitre des dames nobles de Poussay (Chapter of the Noble Ladies of Poussay), where she was raised as a secular canoness among other daughters of the local nobility.

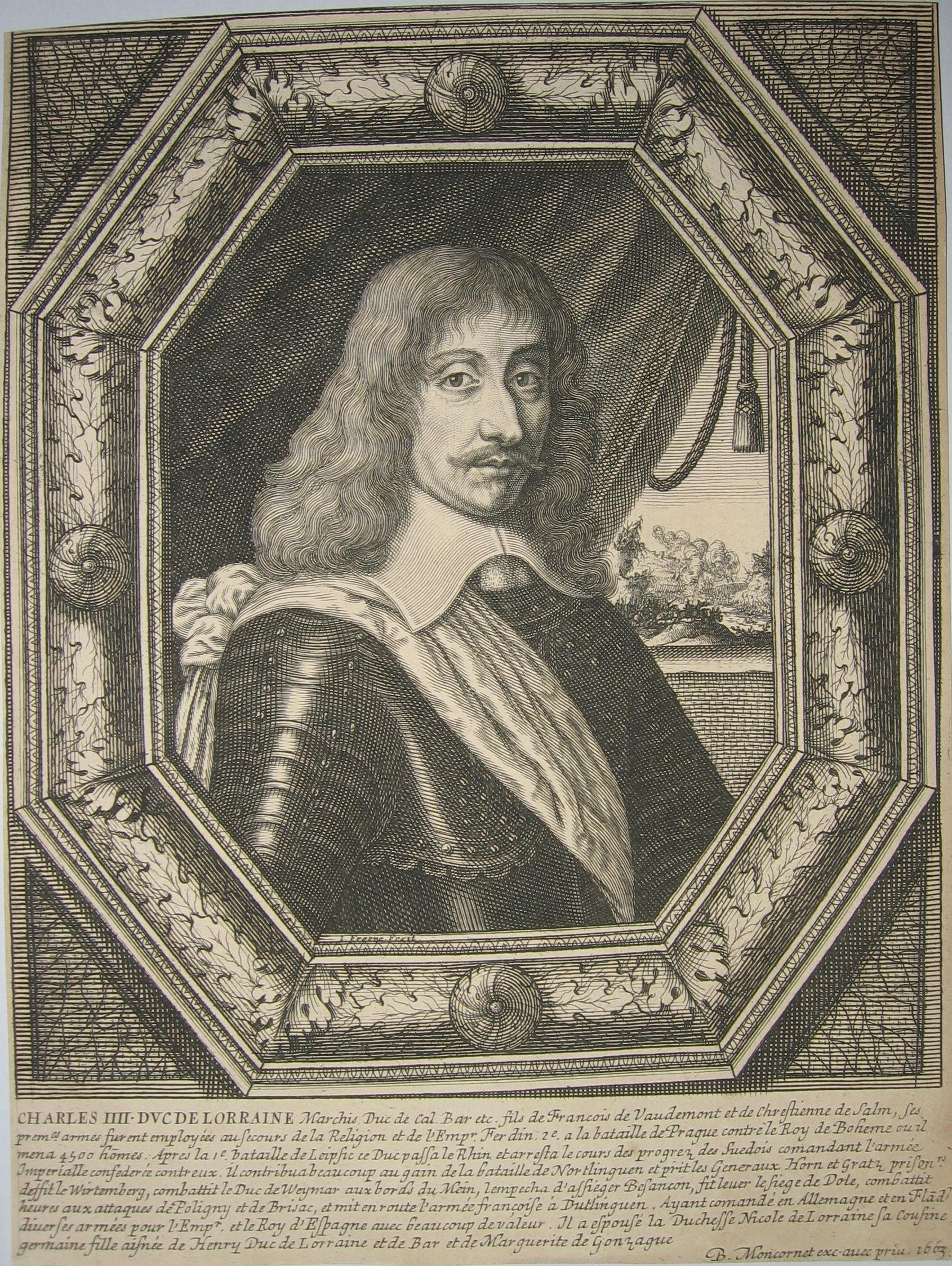
Charles IV of Lorraine in 1663

=== Relationship with Charles IV of Lorraine ===
In 1662, Charles IV, the 58-year-old Duke of Lorraine and Bar (1604–1675) visited the chapter and met the 15-year-old Ludres, promptly deciding to marry her because of her great beauty. He had abandoned his wife, Duchess Nicole (1608–1657), marrying bigamously his mistress, Béatrix de Cusance, Baroness of Belvoir and Saint-Julien (1614–1663), and was excommunicated for this. By 1662, however, he had also abandoned the baroness and the children they had together, then returned to them when his legal wife died in 1657, only to leave them again for Ludres. Their engagement lasted a year before the duke decided to marry the baroness instead on 20 May 1663.

When the new duchess died a few weeks after the marriage on 5 June, Ludres expected the duke to return to her. Instead, he chose Marie-Louise d'Aspremont (1651/1652–1692), a 14-year-old noble girl. Ludres actively opposed their marriage, having the support of the Lorraine clergy. Charles threatened to prosecute her for lèse-majesté and married Aspremont.

== In the French court ==
The three employers of Ludres

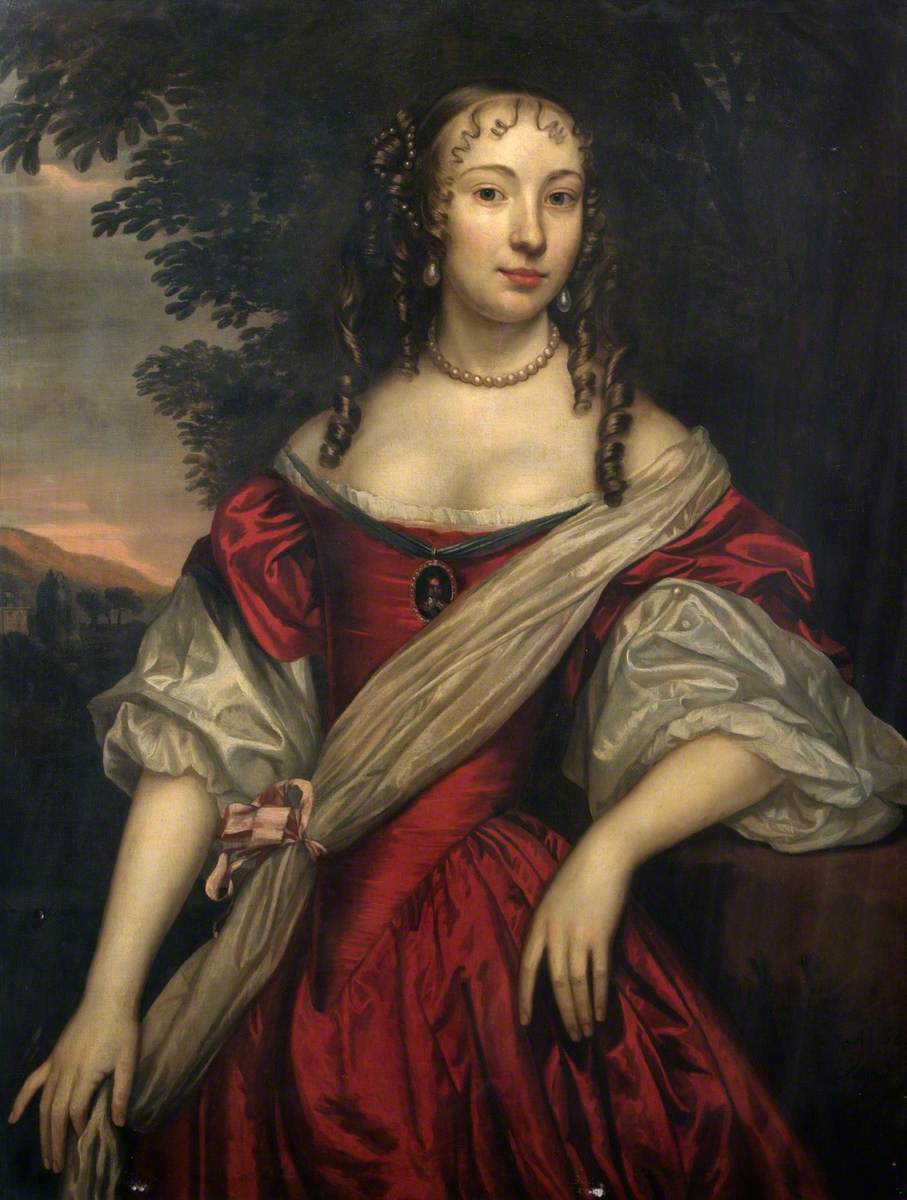
Henriette, Duchess of Orléans in 1665

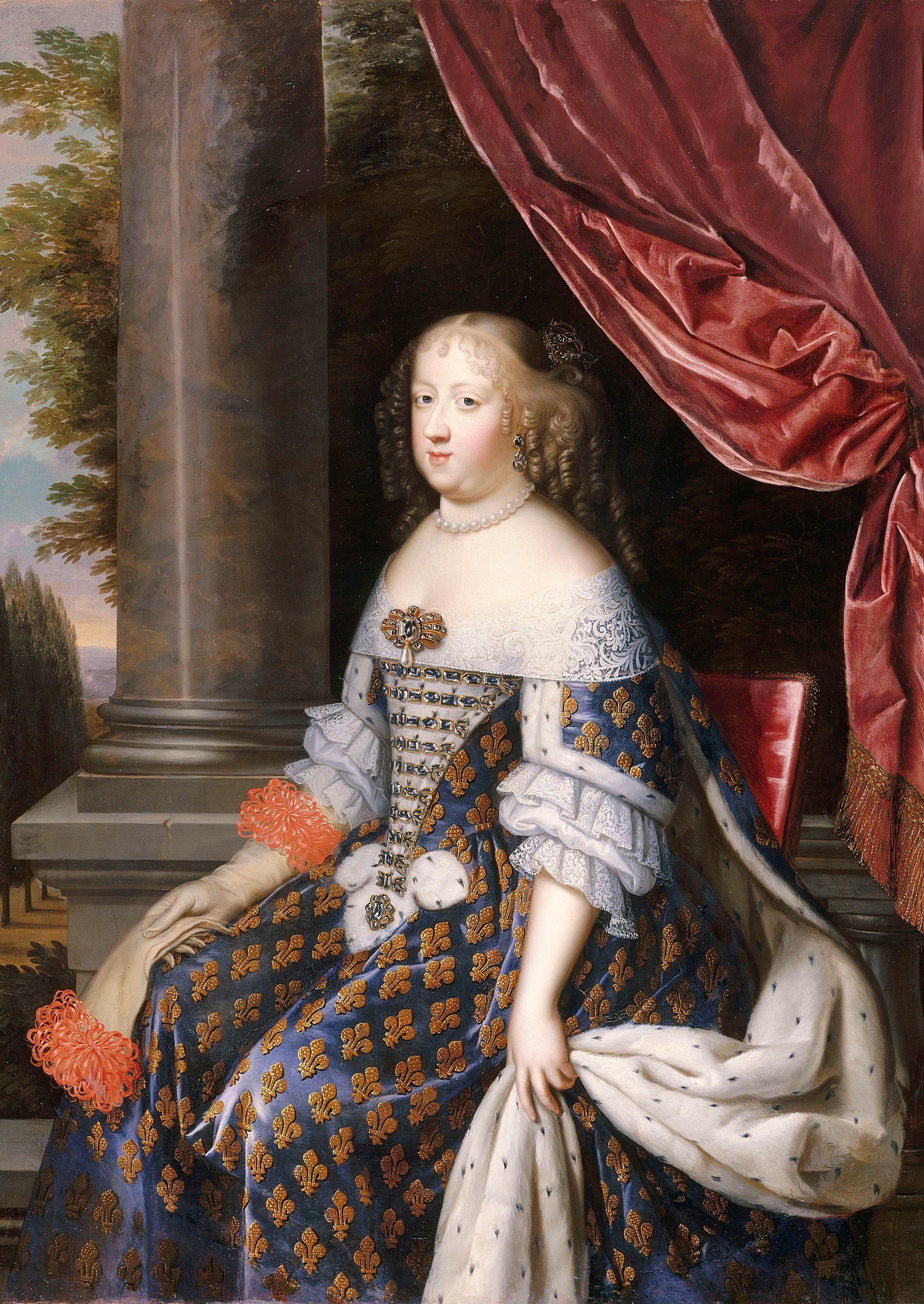
Maria Theresa, Queen of France in 1660

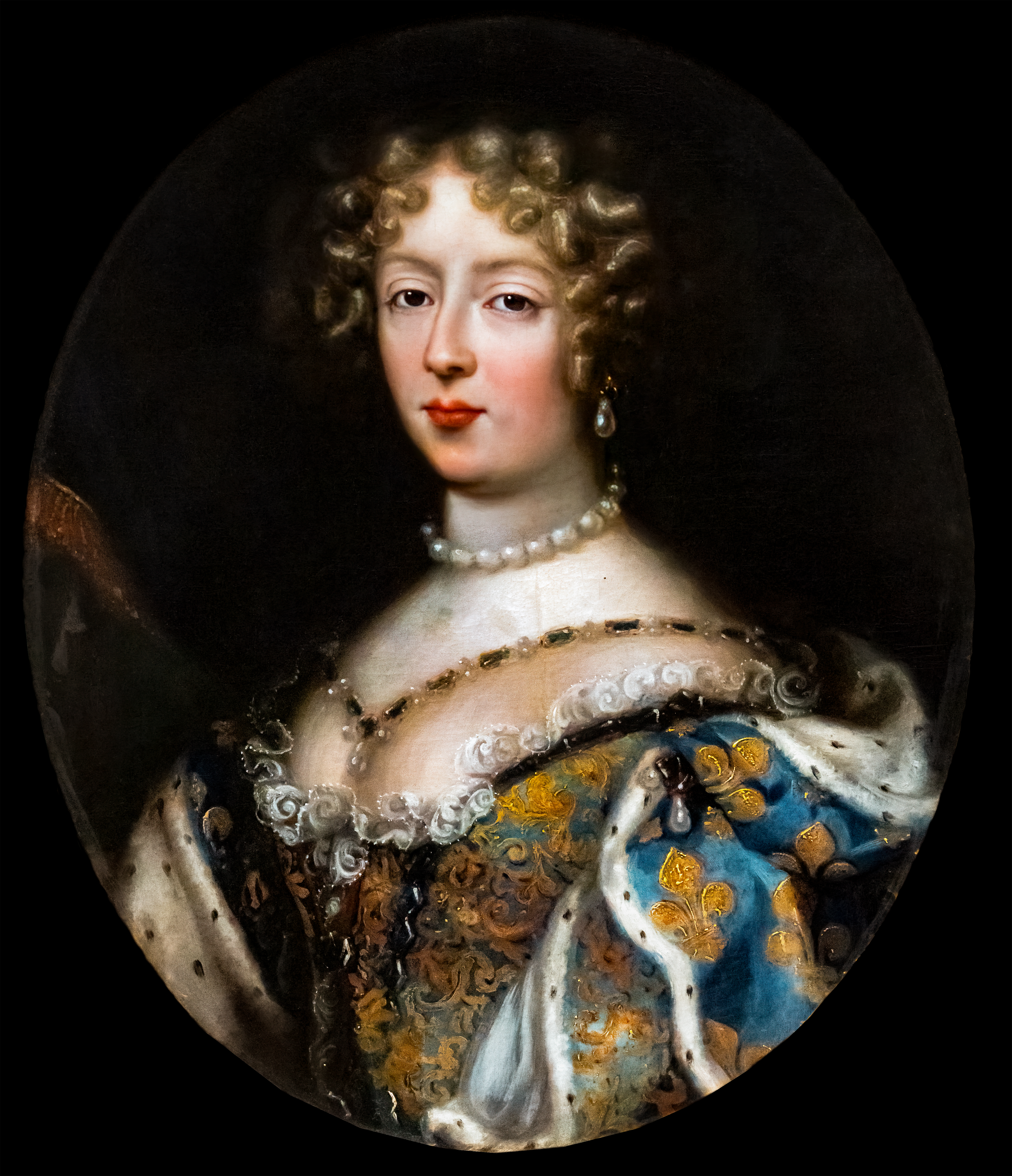
Elizabeth Charlotte, Duchess of Orléans around 1670

In 1664, Ludres left Poussay for the French royal court, retaining her title of canoness. She was presented to the King Louis XIV on 6 May of that year in the presence of her parents, her brother, and her ex-fiancé. She was appointed lady-in-waiting to the Duchess Henrietta of Orléans (1644–1670), the king's sister-in-law, known at the court as "Madame". Upon Madame's death in 1670, Ludres was sent to serve Queen (consort) Maria Theresa (1638–1683). When Duke Philippe I of Orléans remarried to Princess Elizabeth Charlotte "Liselotte" of the Palatinate in 1673, known as "Madame Palatine", Ludres was re-appointed to her court.

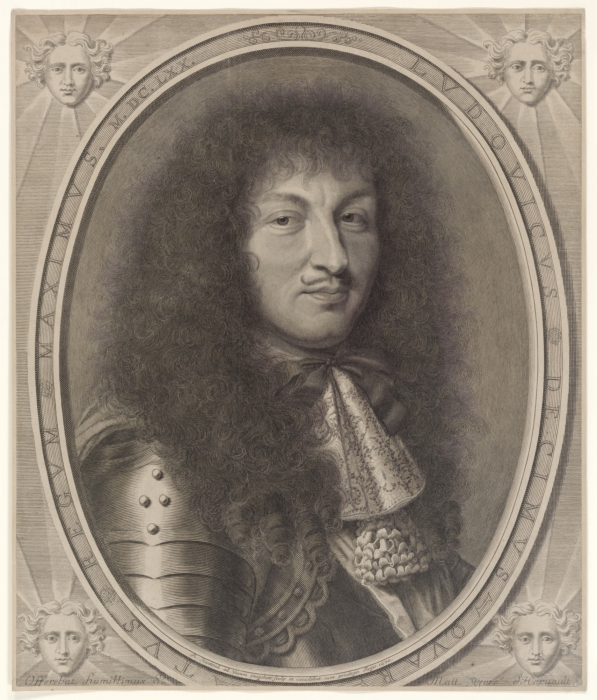
Louis XIV in 1670

=== Relationship with Louis XIV ===
Ludres' beauty and her Lorraince accent attracted many courtiers, whom she all resisted. Around Easter 1675, during a conflict with her maîtresse-en-titre (official mistress) Madame de Montespan (1640–1707), the king himself, Louis XIV (1638–1715) took an interest in her. They started a discreet affair, but Montespan became jealous. She started a rumour that Ludres suffered of scabies, leprosy, and all imaginable diseases. The king falsified the allegations by keeping Ludres with him.

However, when the king and Montespan made peace, he was forced to at least pretend to break up with Ludres. Montespan continued to mock and criticise Ludres in front of Louis, calling her an haillon (rag), and imitating her Lorraine accent and her naivety. Still, when she had to leave the court in 1676 to give birth to the king's sixth illegitimate child, she could not prevent Louis and Ludres from reuniting.

==== Fall from grace ====
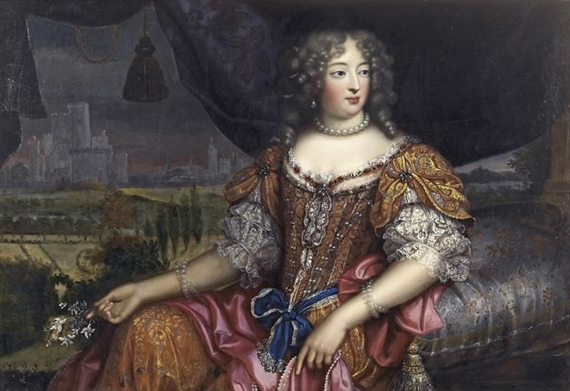
Madame de Montespan in 1670

While the king was away fighting against Spain, Ludres spread the word about their affair, even saying that she was pregnant by him. The ladies who had the privilege of sitting on a stool in the queen's presence stood up when Ludres arrived. She boasted that she had beaten Madame de Montespan and already saw herself as the new royal favourite. She even wrote a letter to the king, which irritated him as he wanted their relationship to remain secret. He broke off all relations with her. After the king and Madame de Montespan had both returned, one day the court was hearing mass. The king greeted Ludres, for which Montespan reproached both of them, signaling her rival's final fall.

== Later life ==
In early 1678, Ludres left the service of the Duchess of Orléans and retired to the couvent de la Visitation de Sainte-Marie in Paris (Convent of the Visitation of Holy Mary), which belonged to the Order of the Visitation of Holy Mary. The king was indifferent to her departure, but offered her a generous sum of money, which she refused. She lived for several years in the convent, but had to ask for a pension from the king to repay her debts. She then returned to Lorraine and lived in the Castle of Vaucouleurs. Here, her cook was Fabien Bécu (de Cantigny), who met his second wife, Anne Husson, a chambermaid, there. Their granddaughter, Jeanne Bécu, born in Vaucouleurs in 1743, would go on to become Madame du Barry, mistress of Louis XV, the great-grandson and successor of Ludres' former lover.

In 1720, Ludres was created Marquess of Ludres by Louis XV. She died in Nancy, Lorraine on 28 January 1726, aged almost 80.
