= Louise Julie de Mailly-Nesle =

Mistress of Louis XV (1710–1751)

- comtesse de Mailly
- Born: 16 March 1710; Saint-Sulpice, Paris
- Died: 30 March 1751 (aged 41); Paris
- Spouse: Louis Alexandre de Mailly, comte de Mailly
Names
- French: Louise Julie de Mailly-Nesle
- House: De Mailly
- Father: Louis de Mailly, marquis de Nesle et de Mailly
- Mother: Armande Félice de La Porte Mazarin

Louise Julie de Mailly-Nesle, comtesse de Mailly (French pronunciation: [lwiz ʒyli də maji nɛl]; 1710–1751) was the eldest of the five de Nesle sisters, four of whom were mistresses of King Louis XV of France. She was first the mistress of the Marquis de Puysieux and then of Louis XV from 1732 until 1742, and his official mistress from 1738 until 1742.

== Early life, family and marriage ==
Louise Julie was born the eldest daughter of Louis de Mailly, marquis de Nesle et de Mailly, Prince d'Orange (1689–1767), and Armande Félice de La Porte Mazarin (1691–1729). Her parents had been married in 1709. Her mother was the daughter of 'Paul Jules de La Porte, duc Mazarin et de La Meilleraye (1666–1731), the son of the famous adventuress, Hortense Mancini, the niece of Cardinal Mazarin. Her mother was a lady-in-waiting in service to the queen, Marie Leszczyńska, from 1725, and her father reportedly "wasted his substance on actresses and the capacious requirements of Court life".

Louise Julie had four younger full sisters:

- Pauline Félicité de Mailly, Mademoiselle de Nesle, marquise de Vintimille (1712–1741),
- Diane Adélaïde de Mailly, Mademoiselle de Montcavrel, duchesse de Lauraguais (1714–1769),
- Hortense Félicité de Mailly, Mademoiselle de Chalon, marquise de Flavacourt (1715–1799).
- Marie Anne de Mailly, Mademoiselle de Monchy, marquise de La Tournelle, duchesse de Châteauroux (1717–1744).

The only one of the de Nesle sisters not to become one of Louis XV's mistresses was Hortense Félicité de Mailly, Marquise de Flavacourt. Louise Julie was the first sister to attract the king, but it was Marie Anne who was the most successful in manipulating him and becoming politically powerful.

Louise Julie also had a younger half-sister, Henriette de Bourbon (1725–1780), Mademoiselle de Verneuil, from her mother's relationship with the duc de Bourbon, the chief minister of Louis XV from 1723 to 1726.

In her youth, Louise Julie was known as Mademoiselle de Mailly. On 31 May 1726, she married her cousin, Louis Alexandre de Mailly, comte de Mailly (1694-1743). The marriage was forced upon her against her will and was reportedly unhappy.

== Mistress to Louis XV ==
=== "The Fair Unknown" ===
In 1729, her mother died. Louise Julie replaced her as lady-in-waiting, Dame du Palais, to the queen. She also became the mistress of the Marquis de Puysieux.

Queen Marie was frequently pregnant, which prevented her from entertaining the restless King Louis XV. Cardinal Fleury, the de facto ruler of France, wished to prevent Marie from acquiring any political influence over the king and harming his own position. Fleury therefore favored the idea of the king taking a mistress to keep him entertained, as long as she was apolitical.

Reportedly, years passed before they finally kissed, and throughout their relationship, she remained "the bolder and more enticing of the two." In 1732 or 1733, according to the memoirs of the Duke de Richelieu, Louise Julie finally became the King's mistress after Louis XV was set up by Mademoiselle de Charolais and other courtiers by literally throwing him on top of a half naked Comtesse de Mailly on a sofa by his valet Gabriel Bachelier.

Louise Julie de Mailly was described as a thin beauty, with a perfect oval face and dark eyes with marked eyebrows, which gave her a "provocative and sensuous charm". She knew how to adjust the fashion to suit her, designed her own "piquant and suggestive" negligees, and often wore her diamonds in her carefully dressed black hair – she was, however, not graceful but rather clumsy in her movements. As a person, she was described as good-tempered, witty and entertaining at social occasions, without being so at the expense of others, and as a loyal and devoted friend and a passionate and sincere lover, ready to sacrifice herself to make those she cared for happy. She enjoyed pleasure and social life but was also described as generous and sympathetic to others. She completely lacked ambition and interest in politics, and genuinely "wanted nothing but the love of Louis XV, whom she adored with all the strength of her passionate nature". She nevertheless was regularly paid per sexual encounter with King according to the memoirs of the Marquise de Argenson Louis XV reportedly appreciated her adoration and love for him and was satisfied with the fact that she was afraid of Cardinal Fleury, never trying to interfere in politics. The King, however, felt guilty on betraying his wife.

Although she became the king's mistress in 1732, de Mailly was not officially recognized as his maîtresse en titre until 1738. During this period the relationship was unofficial and her identity kept secret, known to the court only as the Fair Unknown. Queen Marie was deeply hurt over the affair and unsuccessfully tried to find out who the mistress was, but the adultery had the support of Cardinal Fleury because de Mailly was apolitical; after the first few years the queen became resigned to it.

=== Official mistress ===
In 1738, Marie's 11th pregnancy ended in a miscarriage and she was warned a next pregnancy will be fatal. She ended any sexual relationship with her husband. This signaled the end of her influence over the king and a shift of the courtiers towards de Mailly as the king's mistress.

There was speculation at court as to the mistress's identity: it was only known that she visited his private apartments at night, wearing a hood over her face in order not to be identified by anyone she met in the corridors on her way to and from his rooms. To find out who she was, in the summer of 1738 Gabriel Bicheher stopped Mailly one night on her way to the king's bedroom and knocked her hood off, watched by two of the queen's ladies-in-waiting posted nearby. These spread the word through the court the following day, exposing Mailly's identity. This was probably done on the initiative of the courtiers, who wanted to have an alternative channel to the king after the queen had lost her influence with him.

Following this incident, on 14 July 1738 the king "declared his passion" and acknowledged Louise Julie de Mailly as his official mistress by eating supper with her before his court at the Château de Compiègne. After this she was given rooms next to the king's apartments and appeared as his hostess at his private parties at the Royal castles at Versailles, Choisy and La Muette. The queen regarded Louise Julie as the most hurtful of all the lovers of her spouse because she was the first, but grew accustomed to her; she did not dislike her as a person, as she would come to dislike her sister and successor, Marie Anne.

Louise Julie de Mailly was widely celebrated at court after she was introduced as the king's official mistress, but this put a great deal of strain their relationship. Her new position exposed her to public criticism, and Louis XV reportedly felt humiliated when some regarded her as insufficiently beautiful for her role. She became tormented by jealousy and incidents were noted when they argued, such as once, when she lost at cards and remarked to the king: "It is not to be wondered at, with you here."

The king reacted badly to the fact that she was approached by petitioners who expected her to be able to influence him, and when she showed him the letter from a petitioner, Monsieur de Luc, who ended his petition with: "It needs but one word from the beautiful mouth of a lovely lady like yourself and the business is done," the humiliated king exclaimed: "A beautiful mouth, indeed! I scarcely think you can plume yourself on that!" Nonetheless, she did not use her new position to enrich herself or interfere in politics, and it soon became known that she did not involve herself in political issues or the advancement of petitioners.

Louise Julie was devoted to her family and it was said of her that she was "a loving, sincere little creature with all the qualities of an easy dupe, and she was happy to Introduce her sisters at Court for the sole reason that it gave them pleasure". She invited all her sisters to court on different occasions and helped them establish themselves socially. In 1739, her younger sister Pauline-Félicité sent a letter requesting to be invited to court. Louise Julie granted her sister's wish, but upon arrival at court Pauline-Félicité promptly seduced the king and became his new mistress.

Madame de Mailly remained official mistress, but the king fell in love with Pauline-Félicité and arranged her marriage to the Marquis de Vintimille, enabling her to stay at court, and gave her the castle of Choisy-le-Roi as a gift. Madame de Vintimille quickly became pregnant and died giving birth to the king's illegitimate son, Louis, the duc de Luc, who looked so much like the king that he was called Demi-Louis ('Half Louis'). Madame de Vintimille's remains lay in Lit de parade in the town of Versailles, but during the night a mob broke in and mutilated the body of "the king's whore". The king and Louise Julie were both devastated by the death of Pauline-Félicité and shocked by the mutilation of her body; in her despair she was said to have performed a Catholic rite of penitence by washing the feet of the poor.

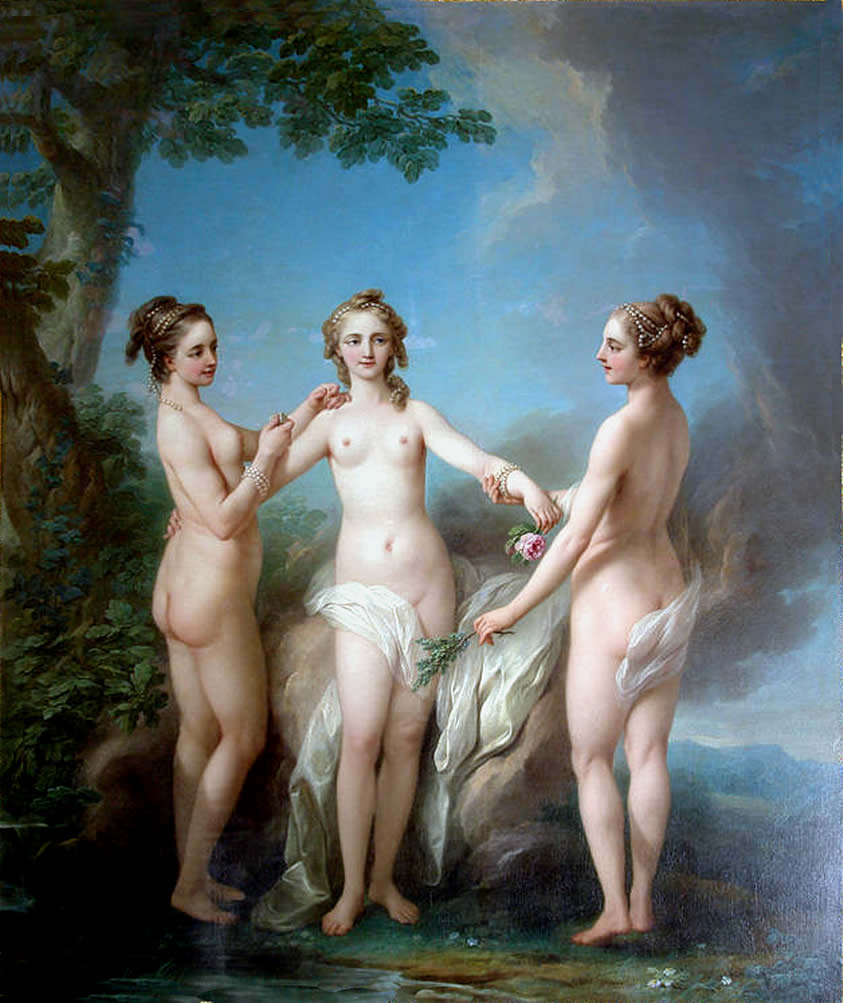
The Three Graces by Charles-André van Loo, 1765. Traditionally, the Nesle Sisters were believed to be the models for this painting.

After this, her recently widowed youngest sister, Marie Anne de Mailly, asked to be invited to court. Relying on her family's devotion to establish herself socially, upon her introduction her beauty and charm made her a great success. Marie Anne was described as "magnificently beautiful", dignified and graceful, with fair hair, "a complexion so white and pure that it glowed", large blue eyes and red lips with a "childlike smile"; she was also considered a charming wit who frequently used irony.

=== Dismissal ===
Louise Julie de Mailly was known to be so in love with the king that she "could do nothing without asking his advice" and never involved herself with state affairs. This made her acceptable to Cardinal Fleury, but also a disappointment to the court nobility, who wished for the king to have a mistress who could influence the king against the pacifist policy of Fleury and engage in warfare, which the ideals of nobility regarded as necessary for national dignity and glory. Among the war-favoring aristocrats were the kings friends, the manipulative duc de Richelieu, and Charles, Prince of Soubise, who supported the idea to introduce a new mistress to the king, who could be used to oppose the influence of the Cardinal and his peace policy and push France to engage in war, and they viewed Louise Julie's sister Marie Anne de Mailly, marquise de La Tournelle, as a suitable candidate for this purpose.

At a masked ball on Shrove Tuesday, 1742, Richelieu led Marie Anne up to the king and introduced them. She herself, however, at first rejected the royal advances. She already had a lover, the young duc d'Agénois, and was not inclined to give him up for the king's sake. As a result, Louis conspired with Richelieu, who was d'Agénois's uncle, to rid himself of the young suitor. Richelieu was quite anxious to do anything to bring about a liaison between the king and Marie Anne de La Tournelle because he knew Louise Julie de Mailly did not view him in a kindly light. The result was that Louis, in imitation of the biblical David, sent his rival to fight the Austrians in Italy. Here, more fortunate than the husband of Bathsheba, the duc d'Agénois was only wounded, and returned to the court in glory.

Louis was in despair, but Richelieu, was not one to lightly accept defeat. He sent his nephew to Languedoc, where a woman had been instructed to seduce him. This she did most effectively; letters of a very passionate nature were exchanged; the lady dispatched those which she received to Richelieu, and in due course they were brought to the notice of Marie Anne de La Tournelle, who, furious at her young duke's deceitfulness, turned her attentions to the king and agreed to the suggestion of Richeliu and Soubise.

The fall of Louise Julie de Mailly was orchestrated by means of depriving her of her official office as lady-in-waiting, which was her formal justification for participating in court life and without which she would not formally be allowed to live at court. On 13 September 1742, the Amable-Gabrielle de Villars, previously a dame du palais, was promoted to dame d'atour, and there was thereby a vacancy among the ladies-in-waiting of the queen. The recently deceased Françoise de Mazarin, a personal friend of the queen, had shortly before her death wished for a post of her favorite step-granddaughter Marie Anne de Mailly, in order to embarrass Louise Julie de Mailly, whom she detested, and the queen herself asked for the vacant place to be given to Marie Anne de Mailly, and by the mediation of d'Argenson, Marie Anne secured the king's approval for her candidacy to this office as dame du palais. In parallel, Marie Anne persuaded Louise Julie to write to Cardinal Fleury and resign her own post as dame de palais in favor of their sister Flavacourt by convincing her that the king wished to favor her sisters for the sake of Louise Julie. She agreed, though she resigned on condition that she be compensated with the post of dame d'atours at the court of the next dauphine. When Cardinal Fleury received her request of resignation, he called upon her and warned her about the danger it would mean to her position, and Jean-Frédéric Phélypeaux, Count of Maurepas warned her: "Madame, you do not know your sister, de la Tournelle; when you hand over your office to her, you may expect your dismissal from Court". Louise Julie, however, refused to suspect her sisters for plotting against her or to retract her resignation, and after her resignation was accepted, she accompanied her sisters Marie Anne de Mailly and Flavacourt to the king and queen to offer the gratitude of herself and her sisters for their new appointments. Although the queen retracted her approval, Marie Anne was appointed to the position on 19 September, and the next day, Cardinal Fleury refused Louise Julie's compensatory future post as dame d'atours of the dauphine. Marie Anne had thereby secured a place for herself at court, and deprived Louise Julie of hers.

After her resignation as lady-in-waiting, the court stopped giving Louise Julie attention and instead turned it to her sister and expected successor Marie Anne de Mailly, whom Louis XV himself started to court openly. However, Marie Anne de Mailly was not in love with Louis, and she presented him with conditions before she agreed to consent to be his mistress. She refused intercourse until he had proved his love by agreeing to provide her with the title of Duchess; a personal income to secure her future; a house "as sumptuous as Madame de Montespan's had been", where she would be able to entertain the king in accordance with royal standards; an assurance than any children born of the union would be provided for and legitimized; to be properly courted before consent, and the dismissal of her sister, his official mistress, from court, and she herself officially acknowledged in her place.

This was a new experience for the king, whose previous sexual partners had never demanded that he court them in any way or made any terms, but he was successfully stimulated to court her by Richelieu, who compared her favorably to his previous lover and presented Marie Anne as a royal mistress to be proud of. The king's courting of the reluctant Marie Anne before the royal court attracted attention, and a song was hummed at court and in town, portraying the lovesick king and his attempts to convince the cold Marie Anne to become his mistress. The king reportedly fell passionately in love with her, but she was refused to answer his letters and acted coldly. During his courting of Marie Anne, he reportedly treated Louise Julie more and more coldly, sitting in silence through their meals, taking to her only about his hopes to seduce her sister, causing her to cry. Repeatedly, scenes occurred during which he asked Louise Julie to leave court, after which she fell to his feet and begged him to be allowed to stay, upon which he would allow her a couple of days more.

Finally, Louis XV agreed to the list of demands of Marie Anne, and on 2 November 1742, he concluded the first demand and evicted Louise Julie de Mailly from court by having the furniture removed from her rooms next to the king's apartments on the pretext that they had been reserved for her sister Flavacourt. She managed to convince the king to grant her another night through an appeal at supper, but the next day, she refused to leave. Richelieu visited her and advised her to leave out of respect for her own dignity and as a duty to her king, and when she consented, Richelieu informed the king that Marie Anne would agree to meet him that very night provided that it would be a secret, and escorted him in disguise to the house of Richelieu for the meeting. However, Louise Julie would still not leave, and Marie Anne was discontent at the king's patience. Louise Julie successfully asked for a last dinner with the king, and when she cried upon departure, he embraced her and promised to meet her a couple of days after her departure.

Louise Julie de Mailly finally left Versailles in the carriage of her loyal personal friend Marie Victoire de Noailles, who offered her refuge. Marie Anne forced the king to retract his promise to meet with Louise Julie, and Louise Julie retired to a convent, where she was to become quite religious.

== In fiction ==
She is a character in the 1959 novel Louis the Well Beloved by Eleanor Alice Burford (under the pen name Jean Plaidy).

== See also ==
- French royal mistresses
