= Pauline Félicité de Mailly-Nesle =

French noblewoman and mistress of Louis XV

- marquise de Vintimille
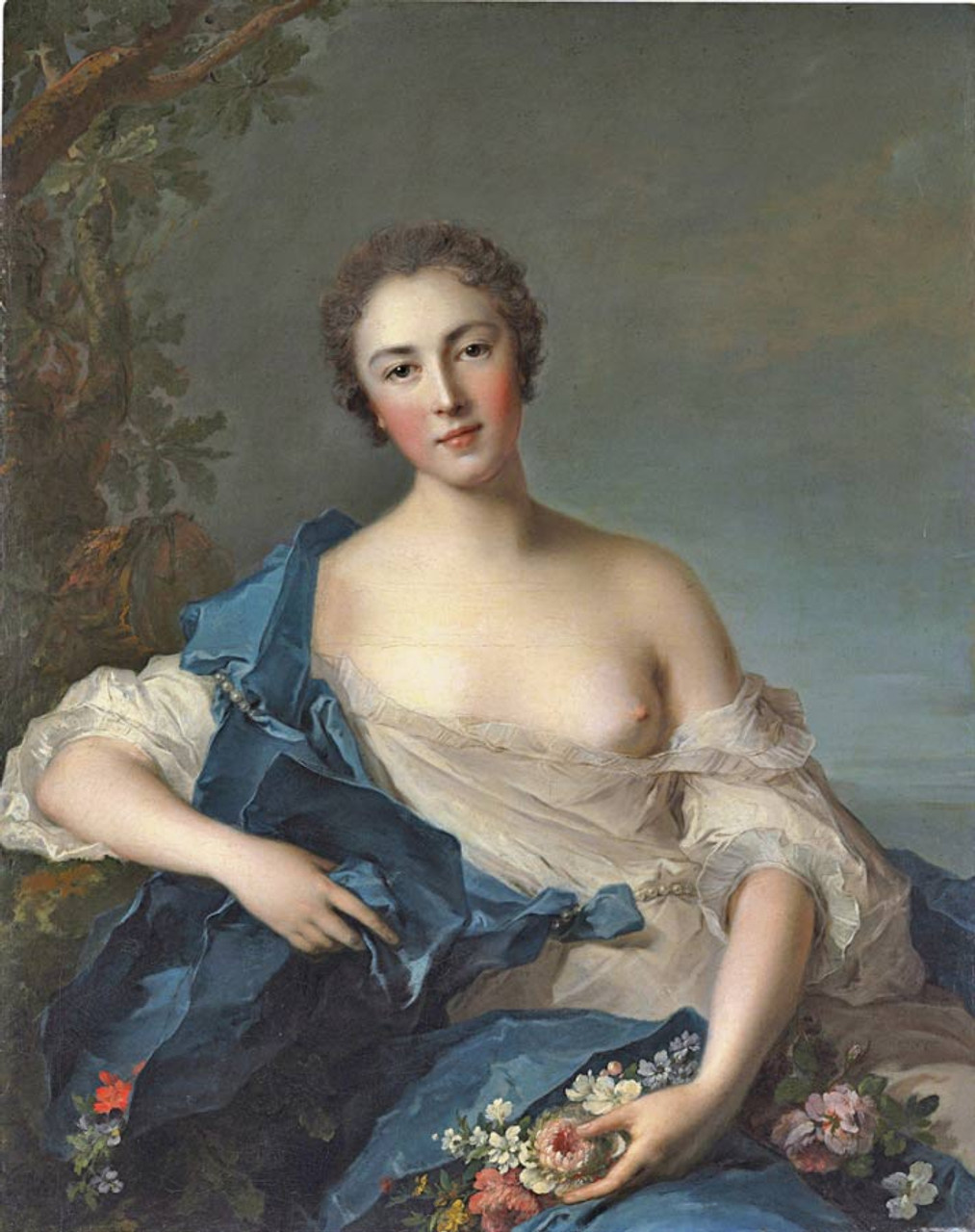
- Pauline Félicité de Mailly-Nesle, marquise de Vintimille, by Jean-Marc Nattier
- Born: 1712; Paris
- Died: 9 September 1741 (aged 28–29); Paris
- Spouse: Jean Baptiste Félix Hubert de Vintimille, marquis de Vintimille, comte du Luc
- Issue: Charles de Vintimille
Names
- French: Pauline Félicité de Mailly-Nesle
- House: De Mailly
- Father: Louis de Mailly, marquis de Nesle et de Mailly
- Mother: Armande Félice de La Porte Mazarin

Pauline Félicité de Mailly-Nesle, marquise de Vintimille (1712–1741), was the second of the five famous de Nesle sisters, four of whom would become mistresses of King Louis XV of France. She was his mistress between 1739 and 1741.

== Early life and family ==
Pauline Félicité was born the second daughter of Louis de Mailly, marquis de Nesle et de Mailly, Prince d'Orange (1689–1767), and Armande Félice de La Porte Mazarin (1691–1729). Her parents had been married in 1709. Her mother was the daughter of Paul Jules de La Porte, duc Mazarin et de La Meilleraye (1666–1731), the son of the famous adventuress, Hortense Mancini, the niece of Cardinal Mazarin. Pauline Félicité had four full sisters:

- Louise Julie de Mailly, Mademoiselle de Mailly, comtesse de Mailly (1710–1751),
- Diane Adélaïde de Mailly, Mademoiselle de Montcavrel, duchesse de Lauraguais (1714–1769),
- Hortense Félicité de Mailly, Mademoiselle de Chalon, marquise de Flavacourt (1715–1799).
- Marie Anne de Mailly, Mademoiselle de Monchy, marquise de La Tournelle, duchesse de Châteauroux (1717–1744).

The only one of the de Nesle sisters not to become one of Louis XV's mistresses was the marquise de Flavacourt. Louise Julie was the first sister to attract the king followed by Pauline Félicité, but it was Marie Anne who was the most successful in manipulating him and becoming politically powerful.

Pauline Félicité also had a younger half-sister, Henriette de Bourbon (1725–1780), Mademoiselle de Verneuil, from her mother's relationship with the duc de Bourbon, the chief minister of Louis XV from 1723 to 1726.

In her youth, Pauline Félicité was known as Mademoiselle de Nesle.

== Mistress to Louis XV ==
In 1738, Pauline Félicité wrote to her elder sister, Louise Julie, the king's official mistress, asking to be invited to court. She received the invitation, and during her stay proceeded to seduce the king, who fell passionately in love with her.

Pauline Félicité then became the second mistress of Louis XV, although her sister kept the official position of maîtresse en titre. The king lavished her with gifts, the greatest being the castle of Choisy-le-Roi, newly decorated in blue and silver. To provide her an appropriate status at court, the king arranged for her to marry a nobleman who agreed not to interfere in their relationship. On 28 September 1739, Pauline Félicité married Jean Baptiste Félix Hubert de Vintimille, marquis de Vintimille, comte du Luc (born 1720), who departed to the country after their wedding. After the wedding, she was also given the post of designate Dame du Palais (lady-in-waiting) to the future bride of the crown prince and 6000 livres; though the crown prince was not yet even married, this gave her an official place in the court hierarchy. The new marquise de Ventimille soon became pregnant by the king.

Pauline Félicité was described as taller, louder and wittier than her older sister. She was much more ambitious than her older sister and predecessor, and demonstrated a desire for money and political influence; her arrogance quickly made her hated within the court and by the public.

Her period as royal mistress was cut short; she died of convulsions in 1741 while giving birth to a son. Her corpse was placed at Lit de parade in the town of Versailles, but during the night the guards left the room to drink, and a mob broke in and mutilated the corpse of "the king's whore".

Both the king and her older sister, Louise Julie, were devastated by the death of their lover and sister, and Louise Julie reportedly underwent a Catholic ritual of penitence by washing the feet of the poor out of mourning for her departed sister.

The son of the king and Madame de Ventimille was named Charles de Ventimille and given the title of duc de Luc. He so resembled his father that he was called Demi-Louis. He was raised by his aunt, Louise Julie but was legally acknowledged by his mother's husband. The king took care of his financial needs but never paid him much attention nor was he brought up at court. The Duke de Richeliue who was a close friend of Louis XV stated in his memoirs that the "King will never legitimized any of his illegitimate children as long as his wife Queen Marie Leszczyńska was still alive" out of respect to their once loving marriage, a principle which he uphold even after the death of his wife in 1768. Later, Madame de Pompadour wanted to marry her daughter to him, but the king would not allow it.

== Depiction in fiction ==
Pauline is one of the central characters in Sally Christie's The Sisters of Versailles (Simon&Schuster 2015), a novel about Louis XV and the notorious Mailly-Nesle sisters.
