= Diane Adélaïde de Mailly-Nesle =

French noblewoman and mistress of Louis XV

- Duchesse de Lauraguais
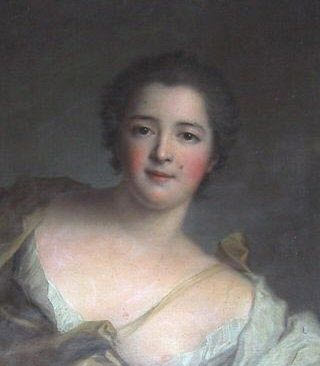
- Diane Adélaïde de Mailly-Nesle, duchesse de Lauraguais, by Jean-Marc Nattier
- Born: 11 February 1712; Saint-Sulpice, Paris
- Died: 3 November 1769 (aged 57); Paris
- Spouse: Louis de Brancas, duc de Lauraguais, duc et pair de Villars
Names
- French: Diane Adélaïde de Mailly-Nesle
- House: De Mailly
- Father: Louis de Mailly, marquis de Nesle et de Mailly
- Mother: Armande Félice de La Porte Mazarin

Diane Adélaïde de Mailly-Nesle, Duchesse de Lauraguais (11 February 1713 – 3 November 1769 in Paris) was the third of the five famous de Nesle sisters, four of whom would become the mistress of King Louis XV of France. She was his mistress on and off from 1742 to 1745.

== Early life, family and marriage ==
Diane Adélaïde was born the third daughter of Louis de Mailly, marquis de Nesle et de Mailly, Prince d'Orange (1689–1767), and Armande Félice de La Porte Mazarin (1691–1729). Her parents had been married in 1709. Her mother was the daughter of Paul Jules de La Porte, duc Mazarin et de La Meilleraye (1666–1731), the son of the famous adventuress, Hortense Mancini, the niece of Cardinal Mazarin. Diane Adélaïde had four full sisters:

- Louise Julie de Mailly, Mademoiselle de Mailly, comtesse de Mailly (1710–1751),
- Pauline Félicité de Mailly, Mademoiselle de Nesle, marquise de Vintimille (1712–1741),
- Hortense Félicité de Mailly, Mademoiselle de Chalon, marquise de Flavacourt (1715–1799),
- Marie Anne de Mailly, Mademoiselle de Monchy, marquise de La Tournelle, duchesse de Châteauroux (1717–1744).

The only one of the de Nesle sisters not to become one of Louis XV's mistresses was the marquise de Flavacourt. Louise Julie was the first sister to attract the king followed by Pauline Félicité, but it was Marie Anne who was the most ambitious of them all and who was the most successful in manipulating him and becoming politically powerful due his inexperience in governing, his lack of confidence, and his timidity.

Diane Adélaïde also had a younger half-sister, Henriette de Bourbon (1725–1780), Mademoiselle de Verneuil, from her mother's relationship with the duc de Bourbon, the chief minister of Louis XV from 1723 to 1726.

In her youth, Diane Adélaïde was known as Mademoiselle de Montcavrel. On 19 January 1742, she married, in his second marriage, Louis de Brancas, duc de Lauraguais, duc et pair de Villars (1714–1793). Not noted for her intelligence, Madame de Lauraguais once said, "my husband cheated on me, so I'm not even sure to be the mother of my children." Diane Adélaïde had a daughter Louise Adélaïde de Brancas, Mademoiselle de Villars who died young.

She was appointed Dame d'Atours to the future Dauphine in 1744.

== Mistress to Louis XV ==
In 1732, Diane Adélaïde's oldest sister, Louise Julie, caught the attention of King Louis XV and became his mistress, and was recognized as his maîtresse en titre in 1738. Louise Julie did not use her new position at court to enrich herself or to interfere in politics. In 1739, her younger sister Pauline-Félicité asked Louise Julie for an invitation to court, and when she arrived, she seduced the king and became his mistress. She died in 1741.

In 1742, her youngest sister Marie Anne became the official mistress of the king by the help of the duke de Richelieu, and Louise Julie was forced to leave court and her post of Dame du Palais to the popular Queen Marie Leszczyńska. Throughout the war over the king's affections between Louise Julie and Marie Anne, Diane Adélaïde sided with Marie Anne.

Marie Anne demanded an official position at court and the title of duchess, together with a settled income sufficient to enable her to maintain that dignity and safeguard herself against any reversal of fortune. All these demands were promptly granted by the infatuated monarch. Marie Anne de La Tournelle was appointed Dame du Palais to the queen; letters patent were issued creating her duchesse de Châteauroux, and an income of 80,000 livres was given to her.

Marie Anne arranged her favorite sister Diane Adélaïde's wedding to the Duke of Lauragais, and secured her a dowry and the office of designated lady-in-waiting to the future bride of the crown prince. As royal mistress, Marie Anne was the hostess in the King's private apartments, where she was known to provide amusement and gaiety and introduced the custom of using nicknames: she herself was known as "the princess", her sister Flavacourt as "the hen", and her sister Diane Adélaïde de Lauraguais as the "Street of Evil Words". Diane Adélaïde was said to be entertaining, and once amused the king by producing nicknames for his guests, calling d’Argenson "the sucking calf", Monsieur de Florentin "the sucking pig", Monsieur de Maurepas "the spinning-cat", and Cardinal de Tencin "the ostrich".

=== War of the Austrian Succession ===
Directed by Richelieu, himself dominated by Madame de Tencin, Marie Anne encouraged the king to form an alliance with Frederick II of Prussia, and personally participate in warfare and visit the battlefield during the War of the Austrian Succession in 1744. She visited Louis XV when he was with his army at Dunkerque, and again in Metz. When Marie Anne visited the king in Metz near the front, she was accompanied by Diane Adélaïde. Besides being an amiable companion, Marie Anne did not consider her simple sister much of a rival. It was rumoured at the time, that one of the methods by which Marie Anne kept the interest of the king was to periodically offer him a ménage à trois with her sister, Diane Adélaïde de Lauraguais. That Lauraguais actually began sleeping with the king at this point is debatable. Nevertheless, the widespread rumors made the two sisters' visit to the king in Metz a national scandal. During the notorious visit of the sisters in Metz, the king suddenly fell gravely ill on 8 August. Fearing to be at his deathbed, Louis XV was afflicted by a religious crisis and wished to renounce his adultery and mistresses and ask his wife for her forgiveness. The queen was called to Metz, and Marie Anne and Diane Adélaïde ordered to leave. During their journey back to Paris, the sisters were threatened by mobs who threatened to lynch them and their coach was attacked with stones.

Louis XV recovered from his illness, and upon his return from the battlefield, he made a triumphal entry into Paris. Missing Marie Anne, he visited her in secret on 14 November, and on the 25th, minister Maurepas was obliged to recall Marie Anne to Versailles, where she was restored in her former position as royal mistress. Her return to court was described as a triumph, and there were fears that she would exact revenge upon her enemies. However, she had barely arrived at court before she fell sick with convulsive pains and cramp attacks. She died on 8 December 1744, convinced on her deathbed that she had been poisoned. She was swiftly buried without ceremony in the church of St Sulpice in Paris on 13 December.

After her death, the king for a short time consoled himself with her sister, Diane Adélaïde de Lauraguais. A few months later in 1745, however, the king already had a new mistress, Madame de Pompadour.

== Depiction in fiction ==
Diane Adelaide is one of the central characters in Sally Christie's The Sisters of Versailles (Simon&Schuster 2015), a novel about Louis XV and the notorious Mailly-Nesle sisters.

== See also ==
- French royal mistresses
