= Hortense Mancini =

- Duchess of La Meilleraye suo jure Duchess of Mazarin
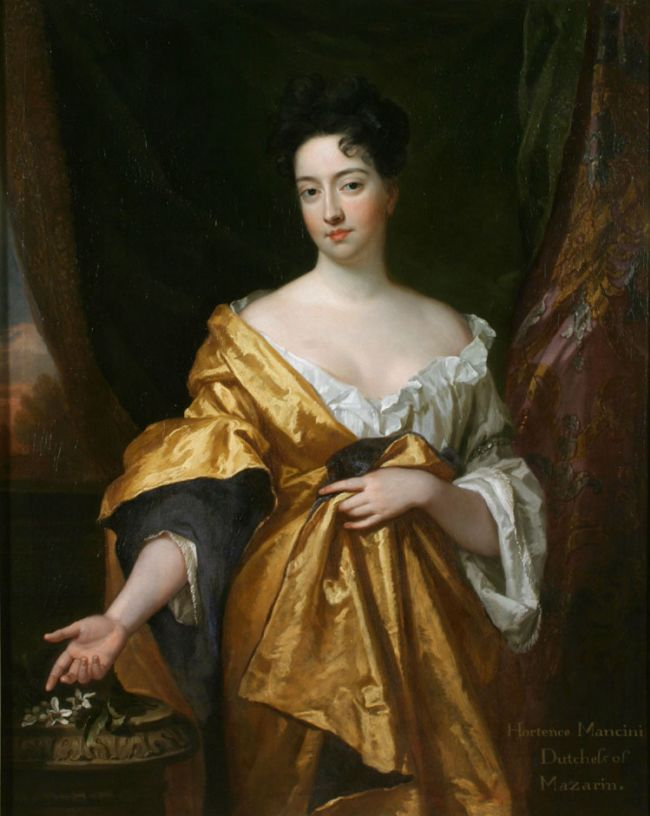
- Portrait of Hortense Mancini by Sir Godfrey Kneller c. 1693
- Born: 6 June 1646; Rome, Papal States
- Died: 2 July 1699 (aged 53)
- Spouse: Armand Charles de La Porte de La Meilleraye (m. 1661; sep. 1668)
- Issue: Marie Charlotte, Duchess of Aiguillon; Marie Anne de La Porte; Marie Olympe, Marquise of Bellefonds; Paul Jules, 3rd Duke of La Meilleraye
Names
- Italian: Ortensia Mancini; French: Hortense Mancini
- Father: Lorenzo Mancini
- Mother: Girolama Mazzarini

Hortense Mancini, Duchess of Mazarin (6 June 1646 – 2 July 1699), was a niece of Cardinal Mazarin, chief minister of France, and a mistress of Charles II, King of England, Scotland, and Ireland. She was the fourth of the five famous Mancini sisters, who, along with two of their female Martinozzi cousins, were known at the court of King Louis XIV of France as the Mazarinettes.

== Early life, family and marriage ==
One of five sisters noted for their great beauty, she was born Ortensia in Rome to Baron Lorenzo Mancini, an Italian aristocrat. After his death in 1650, her mother, Girolama Mazzarini, brought her daughters from Rome to Paris in the hope of using the influence of her brother, Cardinal Mazarin, to gain them advantageous marriages. Hortense's four famous sisters were:

- Laura (1636–1657), who married Louis de Bourbon, duc de Vendôme and became the mother of the famous French general Louis Joseph de Bourbon, duc de Vendôme,
- Olympe (1638–1708), who married Prince Eugène-Maurice of Savoy-Carignano and became the mother of the famous Austrian general Prince Eugene of Savoy,
- Marie (1639–1715), who married Prince Lorenzo Onofrio Colonna and was the first romantic love of King Louis XIV,
- Marie Anne (1649–1714), who married Godefroy Maurice de La Tour d'Auvergne, Duke of Bouillon, a nephew of the famous field marshal Turenne.

The sisters' cousins, the Martinozzis, also moved to France at the same time, for the same goal (to marry well). The elder, Anne Marie Martinozzi, married Armand de Bourbon, Prince de Conti. The younger, Laura, married Alfonso IV d'Este, duke of Modena and became the mother of Mary of Modena, second wife of James II of England.

The Mancinis also had three brothers: Paul (twin brother to Laura), Philippe and Alphonse.

=== Marriage proposals ===
Charles II of England, the first cousin of Louis XIV, proposed to Hortense in 1659, but his offer was rejected by Cardinal Mazarin, who believed the exiled king to have little in the way of prospects. Mazarin realised his mistake when Charles was restored as King of England only months later. Mazarin then became the supplicant and offered a dowry of 5 million livres, but Charles refused. While a marriage did not materialise, the two were to cross paths later. Hortense's hand was also requested by Charles Emmanuel II, Duke of Savoy, another first cousin of Louis XIV, but arrangements fell through when Cardinal Mazarin refused to include the stronghold-castle of Pignerol in her dowry. For similar reasons, an offer made by the Duke of Lorraine was broken off as well.

=== Failed marriage ===
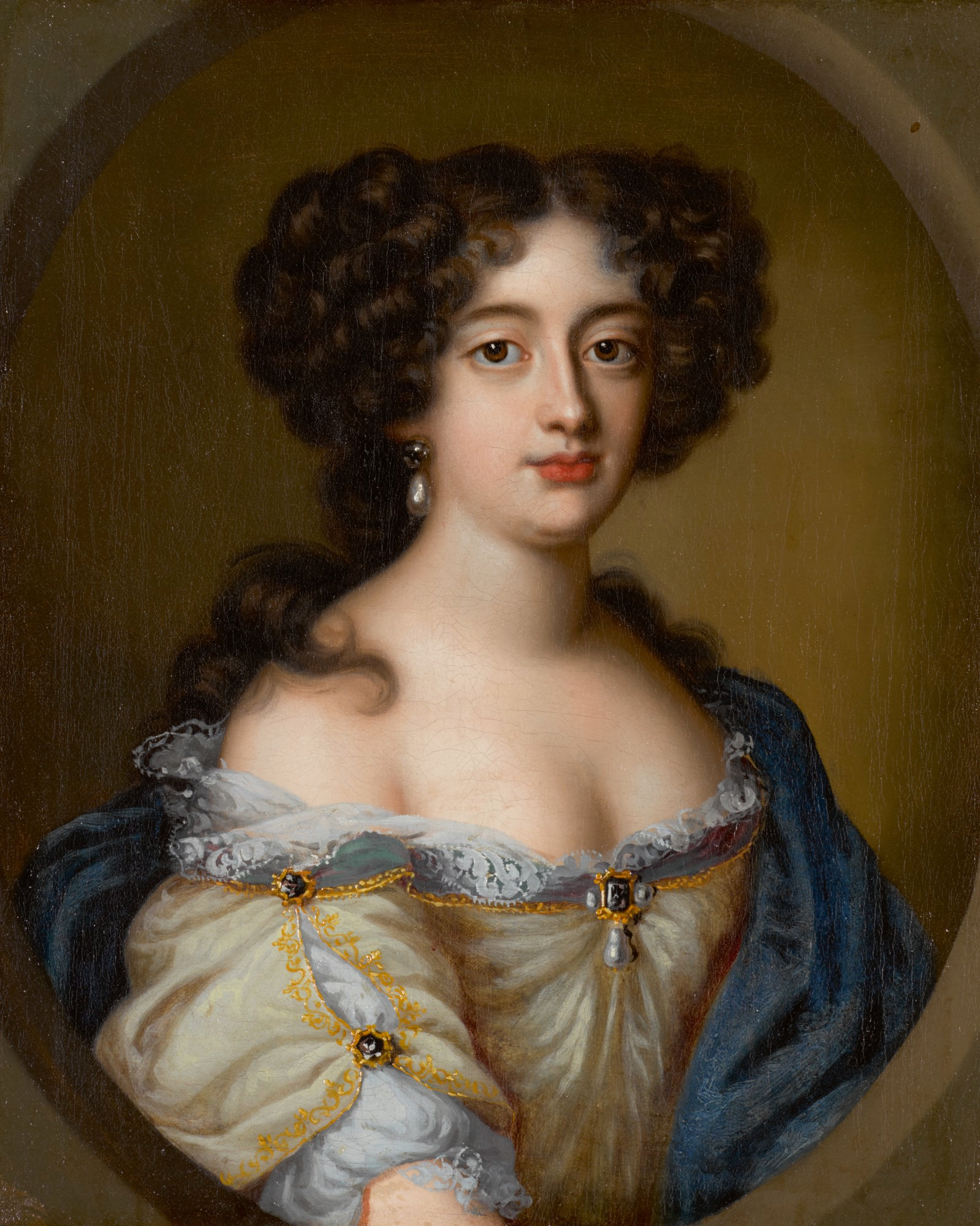
1675 portrait of Mancini by Jacob Ferdinand Voet

On 1 March 1661, fourteen-year-old Hortense was married to one of the richest men in Europe, Armand Charles de La Porte de La Meilleraye. Upon marriage to Hortense, he was granted the title of duc Mazarin. On the death of Cardinal Mazarin soon after, he gained access to his wife's huge inheritance, which included the Palais Mazarin in Paris, home to many pieces of fine art.

The marriage was not a success. Hortense was young, bright, and popular; Armand-Charles was miserly and extremely jealous, not to mention mentally unstable. His strange behaviour included preventing milkmaids from going about their job (to his mind, the cows' udders had strong sexual connotations), having all of his female servants' front teeth knocked out to prevent them from attracting male attention, and chipping off and painting over all the "dirty bits" in his fantastic art collection. He forbade his wife to keep company with other men, made midnight searches for hidden lovers, insisted she spend a quarter of her day at prayer, and forced her to leave Paris and move with him to the country.

== Issue ==
Despite their differences, Hortense and her husband had four children:

1. Marie Charlotte de La Porte (28 March 1662 – 13 May 1729) married Louis Armand de Vignerot du Plessis, Marquis de Richelieu
2. Marie Anne de La Porte (1663 – October 1720) became an abbess
3. Marie Olympe de La Porte (1665 – 24 January 1754), who married Louis-Charles Bernadin
4. Paul Jules de La Porte de La Meilleraye (25 January 1666 – 7 September 1731) married Félice Armande Charlotte de Durfort.

=== Flight from marriage ===
Leaving her small children behind, Hortense finally made a bid to escape from her hellish marriage on the night of 13 June 1668, with help from her brother, Philippe, Duc de Nevers, who procured horses and an escort to help her travel to Rome, where she counted on being able to take refuge with her sister Marie Mancini, now the Princess Colonna.

== Under the protection of Louis XIV and of the Duke of Savoy ==
The French king Louis XIV declared himself her protector and granted an annual pension of 24 thousand livres. Her former suitor, Charles Emmanuel II, Duke of Savoy, also declared himself her protector. As a result, Hortense retired to Chambéry in Savoie and established her home as a meeting place for authors, philosophers, and artists. After the death of the duke, though, she was turned out by his widow, Marie Jeanne Baptiste of Savoy-Nemours, due to Hortense's romantic involvement with her husband.

With the exception of Marguerite de Valois, Hortense and her sister, Marie Mancini, were the first women in France to put their memoirs into print. Both women were partly motivated by the help that producing a body of evidence would bring to the cause of separation from their abusive husbands. Their Memoirs were first published in French, but Hortense Mancini's were translated into English by 1676.

== Charles II ==
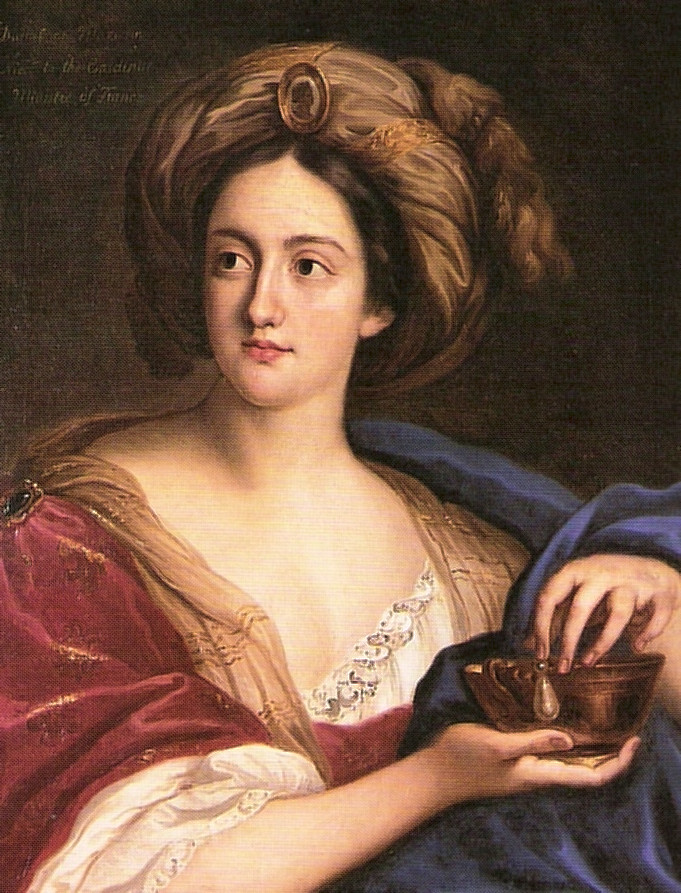
Portrait of Hortense Mancini, duchesse de Mazarin, 17th century

After the death of Savoy, Hortense had no source of income; her husband froze all of her income, including the pension from Louis XIV.

The English ambassador to France, Ralph Montagu, aware of Hortense's desperate situation, enlisted her help in increasing his own standing with Charles II. He hoped she would replace the king's current mistress, Louise de Kerouaille, Duchess of Portsmouth. Hortense was willing to try. In 1675, she travelled to London under the pretext of a visit to her young niece, Mary of Modena, the new wife of Charles II's younger brother, James, Duke of York. Hortense was dressed as a man; her penchant for cross-dressing is thought by some historians to be an outward expression of her gender neutrality. The publication of an English translation of her Memoirs had made her known to English society prior to her arrival.

=== Maîtresse en titre ===
By mid-1676, Hortense had fulfilled her purpose; she had taken the place of Louise de Kerouaille in Charles's affections. He provided her a pension of £4,000, which considerably lightened her financial troubles.

Montagu recounted:

I went to see Madame de Portsmouth [Louise de Kerouaille]. She opened her heart to me… explained to me what grief the frequent visits of the King of England to Madame de Sussex [Hortense Mancini] cause her every day.

=== Fall from favour ===
This state of affairs might have continued had it not been for Hortense's promiscuity. She was dubbed 'the Italian Whore' in England.

Firstly, there was her almost certainly sexual relationship with Anne, Countess of Sussex, the king's illegitimate daughter by the Duchess of Cleveland. This culminated in a very public, friendly fencing match in St James's Park, with the women clad in nightgowns, after which Anne's husband ordered his wife to the country. There she refused to do anything but lie in bed, repeatedly kissing a miniature of Hortense.

Secondly, she began an affair with Louis I de Grimaldi, Prince de Monaco. Charles remonstrated with her and cut off her pension, although within a couple of days, he repented and restarted the payments. However, this signified the end of Hortense's position as the king's favourite. Though she and Charles remained friends, the Duchess of Portsmouth returned to her role as ’maitresse en titre’.

The introduction to Aphra Behn's The History of the Nun has been taken as a suggestion that Behn, too, had romantic relations with Hortense during this same time. It reads:

to the Most Illustrious Princess, The Dutchess of Mazarine...how infinitely one of Your own Sex ador'd You, and that, among all the numerous Conquest, Your Grace has made over the Hearts of Men, Your Grace had not subdu'd a more intire Slave; I assure you, Madam, there is neither Compliment, nor Poetry, in this humble Declaration, but a Truth, which has cost me a great deal of Inquietude, for that Fortune has not set me in such a Station, as might justifie my Pretence to the honour and satisfaction of being ever near Your Grace, to view eternally that lovely Person, and here that surprising Wit; what can be more grateful to a Heart, than so great, and so agreeable, an Entertainment? And how few Objects are there, that can render it so entire a Pleasure, as at once to hear you speak, and to look upon your Beauty?

Attending Mancini's salon, with its discussion of science as well as literary works, certainly had a noticeable effect on Behn's creativity. Public reading of a scientific text by Fontanelle at the salon increased interest in it, and she soon translated it.

Hortense, however, maintained good relations with the king until his death. On the Sunday before his death, the diarist John Evelyn wrote of:

the King sitting and toying with his concubines, Portsmouth, Cleveland, and Mazarin [Hortense Mancini being the Duchesse Mazarin]... Six days after, all was in dust.

== After Charles II's death ==
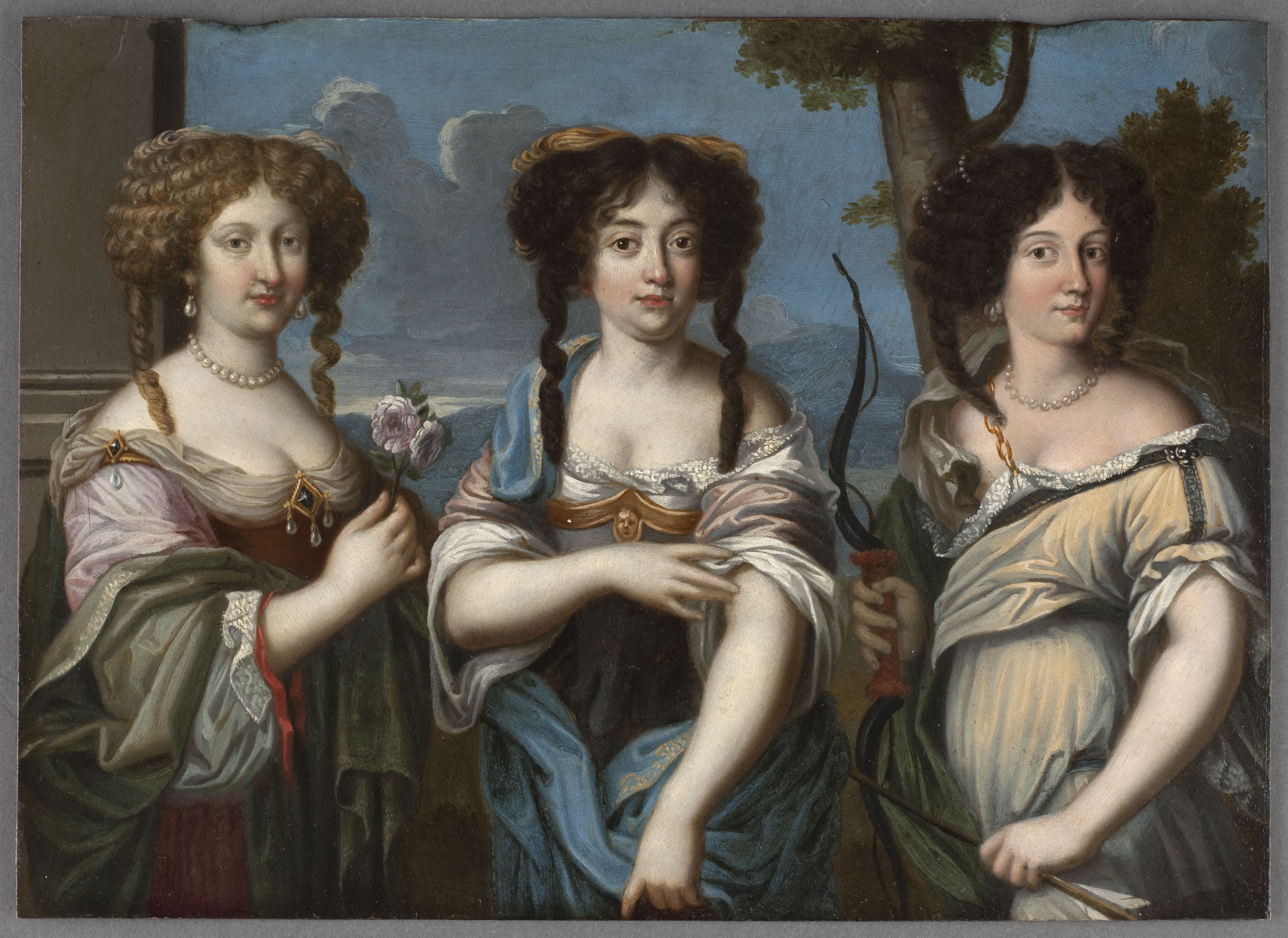
Details of the painting Three Nieces of Cardinal Mazarin: Marie (left), Olympia (centre), and Hortense (right), c. 1660s

Following the death of Charles II, Hortense was well-provided for by James II, possibly because of her kinship with James's wife, the new queen, Mary of Modena. Even when James fled England and William III and Mary II came to power, she remained in place, albeit with a much-reduced pension. During this time she presided over a salon of intellectuals. It was considered one of the most celebrated salons in seventeenth-century Europe. Charles de Saint-Évremond, the great poet and epicurean, was a close friend and brought to her door all the learned men of London. In addition women attended, including Nell Gwyn, Barbara Villiers and Louise de Kéroualle. Champagne made its first appearance in English society as a fashionable drink. Women were able to gamble and also mix with playwrights, theologians and scientists to talk about current events and ideas.

Evelyn recorded her eventual death in 1699:

June 11th, 1699. Now died the famous Duchess of Mazarin. She had been the richest lady in Europe; she was niece to Cardinal Mazarin, and was married to the richest subject in Europe, as was said; she was born at Rome, educated in France, and was an extraordinary beauty and wit, but dissolute, and impatient of matrimonial restraint, so as to be abandoned by her husband, and banished: when she came to England for shelter, lived on a pension given her here, and is reported to have hastened her death by intemperate drinking strong spirits. She has written her own story and adventures, and so has her other extravagant sister, wife to the noble Colonna family.

Hortense may have committed suicide. Her husband managed to continue the drama after her death; he carted her body around with him on his travels in France, before finally allowing it to be interred by the tomb of her uncle, Cardinal Mazarin.

== Descendants ==
Hortense's son, Paul Jules de La Porte, duc Mazarin et de La Meilleraye, had two surviving children. His daughter, Armande Félice de La Porte Mazarin (1691–1729), married Louis de Mailly, marquis de Nesle et de Mailly, Prince d'Orange in 1709. Through this marriage, she became the mother of five daughters, four of whom would become mistresses of King Louis XV:

1. Louise Julie de Mailly, Mademoiselle de Mailly, comtesse de Mailly (1710–1751)
2. Pauline Félicité de Mailly, Mademoiselle de Nesle, marquise de Vintimille (1712–1741)
3. Diane Adélaïde de Mailly, Mademoiselle de Montcavrel, duchesse de Lauraguais (1714–1769)
4. Hortense Félicité de Mailly, Mademoiselle de Chalon, marquise de Flavacourt (1715–1799)
5. Marie Anne de Mailly, Mademoiselle de Monchy, marquise de La Tournelle, duchesse de Châteauroux (1717–1744)

The only one of the de Nesle sisters not to become one of Louis XV's mistresses was the marquise de Flavacourt. Louise Julie was the first sister to attract the king, followed by Pauline Félicité, but it was Marie Anne, the youngest and prettiest one, who was the most successful in manipulating him and becoming politically powerful.

Armande Félice also had an illegitimate daughter, Henriette de Bourbon (1725–1780), Mademoiselle de Verneuil, from her relationship with the duc de Bourbon, the chief minister of Louis XV from 1723 to 1726.

Paul Jules' son, Guy Jules Paul de La Porte, duc Mazarin et de La Meilleraye (1701–1738), married Louise Françoise de Rohan in 1716. Their great-granddaughter, Louise Félicité Victoire d'Aumont, duchesse Mazarin et de La Meilleraye (1759–1826), married Honoré IV, Prince of Monaco in 1777. From this marriage, the present Sovereign Princes of Monaco, including Albert II, are descended.

Preceded by Jules Mazarin	Duchess of Mazarin and Duchess of Mayenne; Princess of Château-Porcien; 1661–1699	Succeeded by Paul Jules de La Porte de La Meilleraye
