= Hortense Félicité de Mailly-Nesle =

French noblewoman

- marquise de Flavacourt
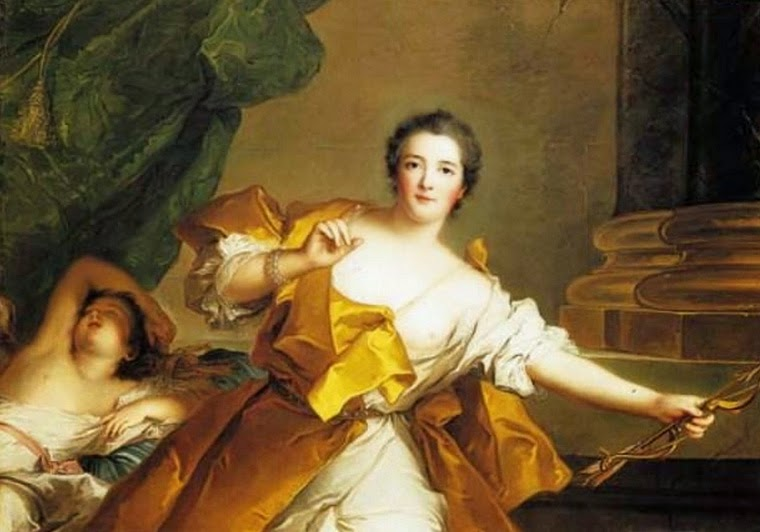
- Portrait historié of Hortense Félicité de Mailly-Nesle as Venus with Sleeping Cupid, by Jean-Marc Nattier
- Born: 11 February 1715; Saint-Sulpice, Paris
- Died: 28 December 1799 (aged 84); Paris
- Burial: 1 January 1800
- Spouse: François-Marie de Fouilleuse, marquis de Flavacourt
Names
- French: Hortense Félicité de Mailly-Nesle
- Father: Louis de Mailly, marquis de Nesle et de Mailly
- Mother: Armande Félice de La Porte Mazarin

Hortense Félicité de Mailly-Nesle, Mademoiselle de Chalon, marquise de Flavacourt (11 February 1715 – 28 December 1799) was a French courtier, one of the five famous de Nesle sisters, four of whom would become the mistress of King Louis XV. Unlike each of her four sisters, she never became the king's mistress, though she was often the subject of speculations.

== Life ==
Hortense Félicité was born the daughter of Louis de Mailly, marquis de Nesle et de Mailly, Prince d'Orange (1689 - 1767) and Armande Félice de La Porte Mazarin (1691-1729). She had four full sisters, Louise Julie de Mailly, Pauline Félicité de Mailly, Diane Adélaïde de Mailly, and Marie Anne de Mailly.

Hortense Félicité de Mailly-Nesle married François-Marie de Fouilleuse, marquis de Flavacourt, in 1739. They had two children Auguste de Fouilleuse, comte de Flavacourt and Adélaïde de Fouilleuse. The marriage was unhappy.

=== Lady-in-waiting ===
She was appointed dame du palais to the popular Queen Marie Leszczynska in 1742, the same year her sister Marie Anne de Mailly became the official mistress of the king.

Her appointment to lady-in-waiting had close connection to the fall of her sister Louise Julie as royal favorite and the succession of her sister Marie Anne to that position. On 13 September 1742, Amable-Gabrielle de Villars, previously a dame du palais, was promoted to dame d'atour, and there was thereby a vacancy among the ladies-in-waiting of the queen. The recently deceased Françoise de Mazarin, a personal friend of the queen, had shortly before her death wished for a post for her favorite step-granddaughter Marie Anne de Mailly in order to embarrass Louise Julie de Mailly, whom she detested. The queen herself asked for the vacant place to be given to Marie Anne de Mailly, and by the mediation of d'Argenson, Marie Anne secured the king's approval for her candidacy to this office as dame du palais.

In parallel, Marie Anne persuaded Louise Julie to write to Cardinal Fleury and resign her own post as dame de palais in favor of their sister Flavacourt by convincing her that the king wished to favor her sisters for the sake of Louise Julie. She agreed, though she resigned on condition that she be compensated with the post of dame d'atours at the court of the next dauphine. When Cardinal Fleury received her request of resignation, he called upon her and warned her about the danger it would mean to her position, and Jean-Frédéric Phélypeaux, Count of Maurepas also warned her: “Madame, you do not know your sister, de la Tournelle [Marie Anne]; when you hand over your office to her, you may expect your dismissal from Court”. Louise Julie, however, refused to suspect her sisters of plotting against her, or to retract her resignation, and after her resignation was accepted she accompanied her sisters Marie Anne de Mailly and Flavacourt to the king and queen to offer the gratitude of herself and her sisters for their new appointments. Although the queen retracted her approval, Marie Anne was appointed to the position on 19 September, and the next day, Cardinal Fleury refused Louise Julie's compensatory future post as dame d'atours of the dauphine. Marie Anne had thereby secured a place for herself at court, and deprived Louise Julie of hers.

Marie Anne de Mailly reportedly felt threatened by her sister Madame de Flavacourt, who distanced herself from her and whom she therefore suspected of having the ambition to replace her as royal mistress, and she suspected the queen of trying to disturb her relationship with the king by presenting a rival to her position. Flavacourt was in fact often the subject of speculations whether she would become the mistress of the king or not. In reality, however, she had no wish to become a royal mistress and only wanted to enjoy her position as courtier because it gave her independence from her spouse: she once told the minister of war, count d'Argensson, that she wished for her husband to be promoted, because otherwise he would leave the army and return to her, a prospect she lamented. Her husband had reportedly threatened to kill her if she should ever become the mistress of the king like her sisters.

=== Later life ===
In 1766, she retired as lady-in-waiting, but she continued to attend court absent office until 1774. She was called back to court in 1792 to participate in the reading of the memoirs of her relative Cardinal Richelieu.

Hortense Félicité de Mailly-Nesle was imprisoned during the reign of Robespierre, but behaved with a calm humour before court which reportedly saved her from execution: she was imprisoned at the Oiseaux Abbey, but released in 1794.

Hortense died on December 28th 1799 aged 84. She was the last of Mailly-Nesle sisters, and one of the few known courtiers to have lived through the reigns of Louis XIV, Louis XV, and Louis XVI, although Louis XIV died when she was only seven months old.

== In fiction ==
Louis XV and the Mailly-Nesle sisters, including Hortense Félicité, are the central characters in Sally Christie's novel The Sisters of Versailles (Simon & Schuster, 2015).
