= Marie Anne de Mailly-Nesle =

French noblewoman and mistress of Louis XV

- duchesse de Châteauroux
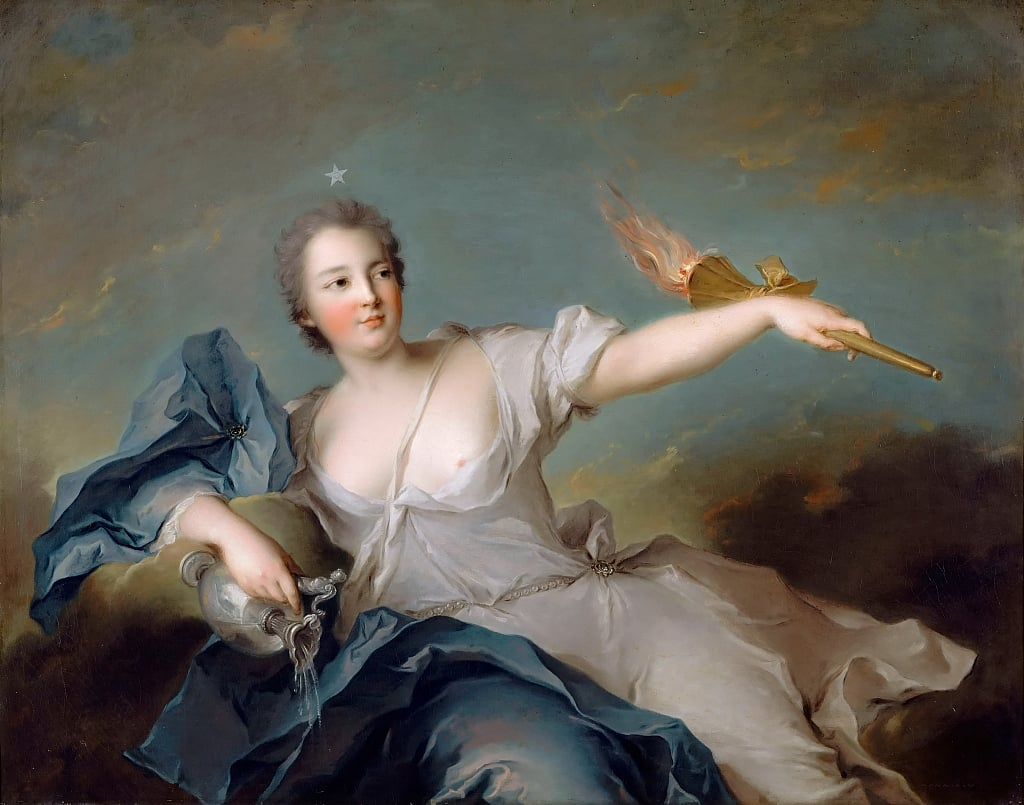
- Marie Anne de Mailly-Nesle by Jean-Marc Nattier
- Born: 5 October 1717; Saint-Sulpice, Paris
- Died: 8 December 1744 (aged 27); Paris
- Spouse: Jean Baptiste Louis, marquis de La Tournelle
Names
- French: Marie Anne de Mailly-Nesle
- House: De Mailly
- Father: Louis de Mailly, marquis de Nesle et de Mailly
- Mother: Armande Félice de La Porte Mazarin

Marie Anne de Mailly-Nesle, duchesse de Châteauroux (French pronunciation: [maʁi an də maji nɛl]; 5 October 1717 – 8 December 1744) was the youngest of five famous de Nesle sisters, four of whom would become mistresses of King Louis XV of France. Marie Anne was the King's mistress from 1742 until 1744.

== Early life, family and marriage ==
Marie Anne was born the youngest daughter of Louis de Mailly, Marquis de Nesle et de Mailly, Prince d'Orange (1689 - 1767), and Armande Félice de La Porte Mazarin (1691 - 1729) who had married in 1709. Her mother was the daughter of Paul Jules de La Porte, duc Mazarin et de La Meilleraye (1666 - 1731), the son of the famous adventuress, Hortense Mancini, the niece of Cardinal Mazarin. Her mother was a lady-in-waiting in service to the queen, and her father reportedly "wasted his substance on actresses and the capacious requirements of Court life". Marie Anne had four older full sisters:

- Louise Julie de Mailly, Mademoiselle de Mailly, comtesse de Mailly (1710 - 1751),
- Pauline Félicité de Mailly, Mademoiselle de Nesle, marquise de Vintimille (1712 - 1741),
- Diane Adélaïde de Mailly, Mademoiselle de Montcavrel, duchesse de Lauraguais (1714 - 1769),
- Hortense Félicité de Mailly, Mademoiselle de Chalon, marquise de Flavacourt (1715 - 1799).

The only one of the de Nesle sisters not to become a mistress of Louis XV's was the Marquise de Flavacourt. Louise Julie was the first sister to attract the king followed by Pauline Félicité, but it was Marie Anne who was the most successful in manipulating him and becoming politically powerful.

Marie Anne also had a younger half-sister, Henriette de Bourbon (1725 - 1780), Mademoiselle de Verneuil, from her mother's relationship with the duc de Bourbon, the chief minister of Louis XV from 1723 to 1726.

In her youth, Marie Anne was known as Mademoiselle de Monchy. On 19 June 1734, she married Jean Baptiste Louis, marquis de La Tournelle (1708-1740).

She was a friend of Charlotte Aglaé d'Orléans, granddaughter of Louis XIV and Madame de Montespan.

== Royal Mistress ==
=== Introduction ===
In 1732, Marie Anne's oldest sister Louise Julie, who had succeeded their mother as lady-in-waiting to the queen, caught the attention of King Louis XV, and, with her husband's consent, become a royal mistress. Although she became the king's mistress in 1732, Louise Julie was not officially recognized as his maîtresse en titre until 1738, and did not use her new position at court to enrich herself or to interfere in politics.

Louise Julie was devoted to her family, and it was said that she was "a loving, sincere little creature with all the qualities of an easy dupe, and she was happy to Introduce her sisters at Court for the sole reason that it gave them pleasure". She invited all her sisters to court on different occasions and helped them to establish themselves socially. In 1739, Louise Julie received a letter from her younger sister Pauline-Félicité requesting to be invited to court. Louise Julie granted her sister's wish, but upon her arrival at court, Pauline-Félicité seduced the king and became his mistress.

While Louise Julie remained as the official mistress, the king fell in love with Pauline-Félicité, arranged for her to marry the marquis de Vintimille to enable her to stay at court, and gave her the castle of Choisy-le-Roi as a gift. Madame de Vintimille quickly became pregnant by the king, and died giving birth to his illegitimate son, Louis, the duc de Luc, who looked so much like the king that he was called Demi-Louis ('Small Louis'). Madame de Vintimille's remains stood in Lit de parade in the town of Versailles, when during the night, a mob broke in and mutilated the body of "the king's whore". The king and Madame de Mailly were both devastated by the death of Madame de Vintimille and shocked by the mutilation of her body. It was said that in her despair, Louise Julie performed a Catholic rite of penitence by washing the feet of the poor.

After this, the recently widowed Marie Anne de Mailly, asked Louise Julie for an invitation to court, and successfully established herself socially, becoming a great success based on her beauty and charm. Marie Anne was described as "magnificently beautiful", dignified and graceful, with fair hair, "a complexion so white and pure that it glowed", large blue eyes and red lips with a "childlike smile", and charming wit frequently based on irony.

=== Struggle with Louise Julie de Mailly ===
Louise Julie de Mailly was known to be so in love with the king that she "could do nothing without asking his advice" and never involved herself with state affairs. This made her acceptable to Cardinal Fleury, a supporter of pacifist policies, but a disappointment to court nobility who wanted the king's mistress to have influence in favor of warfare, which the nobles regarded as necessary for national dignity and glory. The militant aristocrats included duc de Richelieu, and Charles, Prince of Soubise, who both supported the idea of introducing a new mistress to the king in order to oppose the influence of Cardinal Fleury and his pacifist policies. They supported France's engagement in military actions and viewed Louise Julie's sister Marie Anne de Mailly, marquise de La Tournelle, as a suitable candidate for this purpose.

At a masked ball on Shrove Tuesday, 1742, Richelieu led Marie Anne up to the king and introduced them. She herself, however, at first rejected the royal advances. She already had a lover, the young duc d'Agénois, and was not inclined to give him up for the king's sake. As a result, Louis conspired with Richelieu, who was d'Agénois's uncle, to rid himself of the young suitor. Richelieu was quite anxious to do anything to bring about a liaison between the king and Marie Anne de La Tournelle because he knew Louise Julie de Mailly did not view him in a kindly light. The result was that Louis, in imitation of the biblical David, sent his rival to fight the Austrians in Italy. Here, more fortunate than the husband of Bathsheba, the duc d'Agénois was only wounded and returned to the court in glory.

Louis was in despair, but Richelieu, was not one to lightly accept defeat. He sent his nephew to Languedoc, where a woman had been instructed to seduce him. This she did most effectively; letters of a very passionate nature were exchanged; the lady dispatched those which she received to Richelieu, and in due course they were brought to the notice of Marie Anne de La Tournelle, who, furious at her young duke's deceitfulness, turned her attentions to the king and agreed to the suggestion of Richeliu and Soubise.

The fall of Louise Julie de Mailly was orchestrated by means of depriving her of her official office as lady-in-waiting, which was her formal justification for participating in court life and without which she would not formally be allowed to live at court. On 13 September 1742, Amable-Gabrielle de Villars, previously a dame du palais, was promoted to dame d'atour, and there was thereby a vacancy among the ladies-in-waiting of the queen. The recently deceased Françoise de Mazarin, a personal friend of the queen, had shortly before her death wished for a post for her favorite step-granddaughter Marie Anne de Mailly, in order to embarrass Louise Julie de Mailly, whom she detested, and the queen herself asked for the vacant place to be given to Marie Anne de Mailly, and by the mediation of d'Argenson, Marie Anne secured the king's approval for her candidacy to this office as dame du palais. In parallel, Marie Anne persuaded Louise Julie to write to Cardinal Fleury and resign her own post as dame de palais in favor of their sister Flavacourt by convincing her that the king wished to favor her sisters for the sake of Louise Julie. She agreed, though she resigned on condition that she be compensated with the post of dame d'atours at the court of the next dauphine. When Cardinal Fleury received her request of resignation, he called upon her and warned her about the danger it would mean to her position, and Jean-Frédéric Phélypeaux, Count of Maurepas warned her: "Madame, you do not know your sister, de la Tournelle; when you hand over your office to her, you may expect your dismissal from Court". Louise Julie, however, refused to suspect her sisters for plotting against her or to retract her resignation, and after her resignation was accepted, she accompanied her sisters Marie Anne de Mailly and Flavacourt to the king and queen to offer the gratitude of herself and her sisters for their new appointments. Although the queen retracted her approval, Marie Anne was appointed to the position on 19 September, and the next day, Cardinal Fleury refused Louise Julie's compensatory future post as dame d'atours of the dauphine. Marie Anne had thereby secured a place for herself at court, and deprived Louise Julie of hers.

After her resignation as lady-in-waiting, the court stopped giving Louise Julie attention and instead turned it to her sister and expected successor Marie Anne de Mailly, whom Louis XV himself started to court openly. However, Marie Anne de Mailly was not in love with Louis, and she presented him with conditions before she agreed to consent to be his mistress. She refused intercourse until he had proved his love by agreeing to provide her with the title of duchess, together with a settled income sufficient to enable her to maintain that dignity and safeguard herself against any reversal of fortune; a house "as sumptuous as Madame de Montespan's had been", where she would be able to entertain the king in accordance with royal standards; an assurance that any children born of the union would be provided for and legitimized; to be properly courted before consent, and the dismissal of her sister, his official mistress, from court, and she herself officially acknowledged in her place.

This was a new experience for the king, whose previous sexual partners had never demanded that he court them in any way or made any terms, but he was successfully stimulated to court her by Richelieu, who compared her favorably to his previous lover and presented Marie Anne as a royal mistress to be proud of. The king's courting of the reluctant Marie Anne before the royal court attracted attention, and a song was hummed at court and in town, portraying the lovesick king and his attempts to convince the cold Marie Anne to become his mistress. The king reportedly fell passionately in love with her, but she refused to answer his letters and acted coldly. During his courting of Marie Anne, he reportedly treated Louise Julie more and more coldly, sitting in silence through their meals, talking to her only about his hopes to seduce her sister, causing her to cry. Repeatedly, scenes occurred during which he asked Louise Julie to leave court, after which she fell to his feet and begged him to be allowed to stay, upon which he would allow her a couple of days more.

Finally, Louis XV agreed to the list of demands of Marie Anne, and on 2 November 1742, he concluded the first demand and evicted Louise Julie de Mailly from court by having the furniture removed from her rooms next to the king's apartments on the pretext that they had been reserved for her sister Flavacourt. She convinced the king to grant her another night through an appeal at supper, but the next day, she refused to leave. Richelieu visited her and advised her to leave out of respect for her own dignity and as a duty to her king, and when she consented, Richelieu informed the king that Marie Anne would agree to meet him that very night provided that it would be a secret, and escorted him in disguise to the house of Richelieu for the meeting. However, Louise Julie would still not leave, and Marie Anne was discontent at the king's patience. Louise Julie successfully asked for a last dinner with the king, and when she cried upon departure, he embraced her and promised to meet her a couple of days after her departure.

Marie Anne displayed her discontent over the king's last promise to see Louise Julie again and demanded that Louis should retract his promise of a last encounter, and that Louise Julie should never be allowed to court again if he wished to keep her favor. In a letter written soon after, Marie Anne wrote to Richelieu: "Meuse has surely told you, uncle, of the trouble which I had in getting Madame de Mailly to budge", but added that it would still be difficult to achieve something in politics as long as Cardinal Fleury lived.

Cardinal Fleury, the king's chief minister, tried to intervene with the king because he preferred Madame de Mailly as a royal mistress to her more ambitious sister. He did not want Marie Anne interfering in his administration of France. Louis, however, curtly informed him that while he had given the prelate control over the kingdom's political affairs, he had not given him control over his personal life.

=== Royal Mistress ===
Despite having achieved the banishment of her predecessor and the king's agreement to her demands, Marie Anne de Mailly reportedly refused to fulfill the sexual union with Louis XV several times from November until 19 December 1742, after which she "ostentatiously showed herself at the opera so that Louis' choice might be approved", and installed herself in the royal favorite's apartment three days after.

In preparation for her own elevation to duchess, she arranged a marriage between her favorite sister, Diane Adelaide, to the Duke of Lauraguais, and secured her a dowry and the office of designated lady-in-waiting to the future bride of the crown prince. On 22 October 1743, letters patent were issued creating Marie Anne duchesse de Chateauroux with a duchy representing an annual income of 80,000 livres.

The king "asked for nothing more than a place among those who formed her little court", was in despair when she refused to attend his dinners, begged her to be allowed to join the suppers in her room, curtailed his councils so that he could be with her, attending her baths and sitting at her bedside while she was recovering from them, and could be observed writing letters to the duc de Richelieu under her direction. As royal mistress, Marie Anne was the hostess in the King's private apartments where she was known to provide amusement and gaiety and introduced the custom of using nicknames. She herself was known as "the princess", her sister Flavacourt as "the hen", and her sister Lauraguais as the "Street of Evil Words". Her sister Lauraguais was said to be entertaining and once amused the king by producing nicknames for his guests, calling d'Argenson "the sucking calf", Monsieur de Florentin "the sucking pig", Monsieur de Maurepas "the spinning-cat", and Cardinal de Tencin "the ostrich".

Cardinal Fleury's death on 29 January 1743 signified the beginning of her own political career as the successor of Fleury, the political adviser of Louis XV, and the de facto ruler of France. Marie Anne made the king comfortable confiding in her about political issues by giving the impression that she was indifferent to it and made him ask her advice by supporting his own ideas. "She had the supreme cleverness never to question Louis on affairs of State, and so the infatuated King was convinced that his pretty mistress took no interest in politics. The voluptuous nonchalance of her intimacy with him confirmed this opinion. The consequence was that he spoke with her of State affairs without apprehension, and even went so far as to consult her, nay, beg her, to be so kind as to give him advice. In this way she slipped into the government at the King's request without him being aware of it." She only spoke in favor of people she knew he already liked and would be favorable to such as d'Argensson and Noailles, thereby giving him the impression that she only voiced his own views whenever she spoke of politics, and the king thereby felt comfortable saying that his mistress' opinions was his own.

However, her influence was opposed by Jean-Frédéric Phélypeaux, Count of Maurepas and his circle whose satirical rhymes started the development which resulted in the loss of respect for the king and his court among the people. When Richelieu was appointed first gentleman of the Bed Chamber the Parisians nicknamed him "the President of La Tournelle", alluding to Marie Anne's former title.

Marie Anne reportedly felt threatened by her sister Flavacourt, who distanced herself from her and whom she therefore suspected of having the ambition to replace her as royal mistress. She suspected the queen of trying to disturb her relationship with the king by presenting Flavacourt as a rival to her position. While the queen regarded Louise Julie de Mailly as the most hurtful of all the mistresses of Louis because she was the first one, she had grown accustomed to her, and she disliked Marie Anne on a more personal level. The queen regarded her as haughty and insolent, seldom spoke to her, and feigned sleep when Marie Anne was in attendance. In reality, de Flavacourt had no wish to become a royal mistress and only wanted to enjoy her position as a courtier because it gave her independence from her spouse.

=== War of the Austrian Succession ===
When her influence over state affairs was secured, the War-Party of Richelieu demanded progress in their military warfare ambitions. Directed by Richelieu, himself dominated by Madame de Tencin who allegedly originated the idea, Marie Anne was given the task to shake the king out of his passive nature and convince him to place himself at the head of his armies on the battlefield during the War of the Austrian Succession, so as to give him and France prestige. The task was to have appealed to Marie Anne's pride, ambition, and wish to become a heroine. She worked to stimulate the king's pride and sense of responsibility, exclaiming that he owed it to himself to become a great king. Louis XV, exhausted by her reproaches, reportedly cried, "You are killing me", upon which she replied, "Sire, a King must come to life again". He was ultimately persuaded to agree when she stated that the glory of a victory would win the adoration of the people and the downfall of his enemies. In April 1744, Louis XV appointed her future Superintendent of the Household to the future Dauphine, took command of his army, and left for the front at the Austrian Netherlands. It was reportedly Marie Anne who convinced Louis XV to make an alliance between France and Frederick II of Prussia during the War of the Austrian Succession, and she received in person the thanks of Frederick of Prussia.

She visited Louis XV when he was with his army at Dunkerque and again in Metz. When Marie Anne visited the king in Metz near the front she was accompanied by Diane Adélaïde. Besides being an amiable companion, Marie Anne did not consider her simple sister much of a rival. It was rumoured at the time that one of the methods by which Marie Anne kept the interest of the king was to periodically offer him a ménage à trois with her sister, Diane Adélaïde de Lauraguais. That Lauraguais actually began sleeping with the king at this point is debatable. Nevertheless, the widespread rumors made the two sisters' visit to the king in Metz a national scandal. During the notorious visit of the sisters in Metz, the king suddenly fell gravely ill on 8 August. Fearing to be at his deathbed, Louis XV was afflicted by a religious crisis; he confessed to François de Fitz-James and announced his wish to renounce his adultery and mistresses and ask his wife for her forgiveness. The queen was called to Metz, and Marie Anne and Diane Adélaïde ordered to leave. During their journey back to Paris the sisters were taunted by mobs who threatened to lynch them and their coach was attacked with stones.

=== Death ===
Louis XV recovered from his illness and upon his return from the battlefield made a triumphal entry into Paris. Missing Marie Anne, he visited her in secret on 14 November. On the 25th, minister Maurepas was obliged to recall Marie Anne to Versailles where she was restored in her former position as royal mistress. Her return to court was described as a triumph and there were fears that she would exact revenge upon her enemies. However, she had barely arrived at court before she fell sick with convulsive pains and cramp attacks. She died on 8 December 1744, convinced on her deathbed that she had been poisoned. She was swiftly buried without ceremony in the church of St Sulpice in Paris in 13 December.

After her death, the king for a short time consoled himself with her sister, Diane Adélaïde de Lauraguais. A few months later in 1745, however, the king already had a new mistress, Madame de Pompadour.

== Depiction in fiction ==
Marie Anne is one of the central characters in Sally Christie's The Sisters of Versailles (Simon&Schuster 2015), a novel about Louis XV and the notorious Mailly-Nesle sisters.

Marie Anne is also the mistress on the King's arm depicted in Season 2, Episode 2 of Outlander.

== Sources ==
- Edmond and Jules de Goncourt, La Duchesse de Châteauroux et ses sœurs (Paris, 1879)
