= Counts and Dukes of Châteauroux =

French noble title

The titles of Count of Châteauroux and Duke of Châteauroux take their name from the commune of Châteauroux, located in the Indre département of central France, and have changed hands several times.

== History ==
Around 937, Raoul, known as the Large, or the Liberal, abandoned his palace at Déols, either due to its insecurity, or to endow the Abbey of Notre-Dame de Déols founded in 917 by his father Ebbes de Déols; Ebbes was titled prince de Déols, as was his father, prince Laune de Déols, and he built a fortress on a hillside on the left bank of the Indre. From 1112 onwards, this castle was called “Château Raoul”, after the first name often used by the lords of Déols, which became Châteauroux. A town of craftsmen and merchants eventually grew up around the castle. The lords of Châteauroux were powerful: their fief covered two-thirds of today's Indre department; in the 11th century, they had their own coinage. Initially a barony (the barony of Château-Raoul), the title was raised to a county in 1497 for Jean V d'Aumont, as the county of Château-Raoul.

In 1612, its then holder Antoine d'Aumont, 1st Duke of Aumont sold half of the Châteauroux estate to Henry II de Bourbon, prince de Condé. In 1616 the title was raised to a duchy (the Duchy of Châteauroux) by Henry II, who passed it to his son Louis, Grand Condé. It remained in their family line until its inheritance by Louis XV and then, eventually, Charles X.

== List of title holders ==
=== Barons of Château-Raoul ===
- Raoul I the Liberal or the Large of Déols, prince of Déols and Issoudun (915-952)
- Raoul II the Bald of Déols (945-1012)
- Eudes I the Old, lord of Déols, Châteauroux and Issoudun (980-1038)
- Raoul III the Prudent, lord of Déols and Châteauroux (1010-1052)
- Raoul IV Thibaut, lord of Déols and Châteauroux (1040-1099)
- Raoul V the Old, lord of Déols (1070-1128)
- Ebbes II, lord of Déols and Châteauroux (1113-1160)
- Raoul VI, lord of Déols and Châteauroux (1148-1176)
- Denise of Déols and Châteauroux (1173-1207)
- Guillaume I of Chauvigny, son of Denise and André de Chauvigny, lord of Châteauroux (1188-1233)
- Guillaume II of Chauvigny, lord of Châteauroux and Argenton (1224-1270)
- Guillaume III Dent de May, lord of Chauvigny and Châteauroux (1250-1322)
- André II the Deaf of Chauvigny, baron of Châteauroux (1281-1356)
- Guy I of Chauvigny, viscount of Brosse and baron of Châteauroux (1315-1365)
- Guy II of Chauvigny, viscount of Brosse and baron of Châteauroux (1357-1422)
- Guy III of Chauvigny, viscount of Brosse and Dun-le-Palestel, baron of Châteauroux, lord of La Châtre, La Châtre-Langlin, Argenton, Cluis and Saint-Chartier (1407-1483)
- Antoinette of Chauvigny, dame of Châteauroux and viscountess of Brosse (1435-1473)
- François of Chauvigny, brother to Antoinette, viscount of Brosse (1430-1491)

=== Counts of Château-Raoul ===
- Jean V of Aumont, brother-in-law to François of Chauvigny, count of Châteauroux (d. 1521)
- Pierre III of Aumont
- Jean VI of Aumont, count of Châteauroux, marshal of France (1522-1595)
- Jacques II of Aumont
- Antoine of Aumont, count of Châteauroux, marquess of Nolay, marshal of France (1601-1669)

=== Dukes of Châteauroux ===
- Henri II of Bourbon-Condé (1588-1646)
- Louis II of Bourbon-Condé, the Grand Condé (1621-1686)
- Henri Jules, Prince of Condé (1643-1709)
- Louis III, Prince of Condé (1668-1710)
- Louis Henri, Duke of Bourbon (1692-1740)
- Louis XV (1710-1774)
- Marie Anne de Mailly-Nesle, mistress to Louis XV, marchioness of La Tournelle, duchess of Châteauroux (1717-1744)
- Charles X (1757-1836)
