= Place de la Concorde =

Square in Paris, France

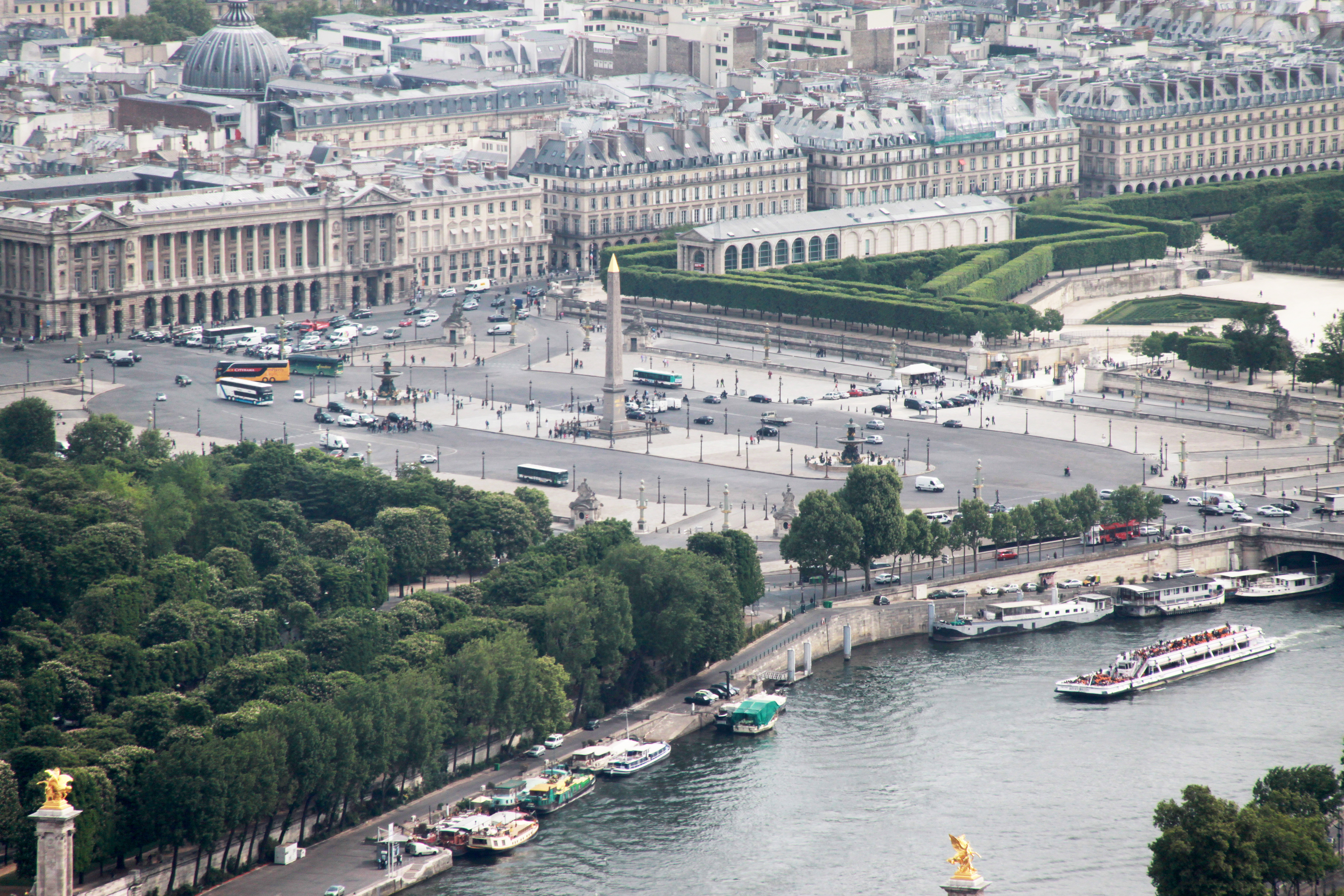
- The Place de la Concorde with its Luxor Obelisk at its centre, seen from the Eiffel Tower

- Location within Paris
- Length: 359 m (1,178 ft)
- Width: 212 m (696 ft)
- Arrondissement: 8th
- Quarter: La Madeleine
- Coordinates: 48°51′56″N 2°19′16″E

Construction
- Construction start: 1757
- Completion: 1772
- Denomination: 1830

The Place de la Concorde (French: [plas d(ə) la kɔ̃kɔʁd]; "Harmony Square"), originally the Place Louis XV (Louis XV Square), and later the Place Louis XVI (Louis XVI Square), is a public square in Paris. Measuring 7.6 ha (19 acres) in area, it is the largest square in the city. It is located in the 8th arrondissement, at the eastern end of the Champs-Élysées.

The square was the site of many notable public executions, including Louis XVI, Marie Antoinette and Maximilien Robespierre in the course of the French Revolution, during which it was temporarily renamed the Place de la Révolution ('Revolution Square'). It received its current name in 1795 as a gesture of reconciliation in the later years of the revolution, although later the original name was reinstated for a period. A metro station is located at the northeastern corner of Place de la Concorde on Lines 1, 8, and 12 of the Paris Métro.

== History ==
=== Design and construction ===
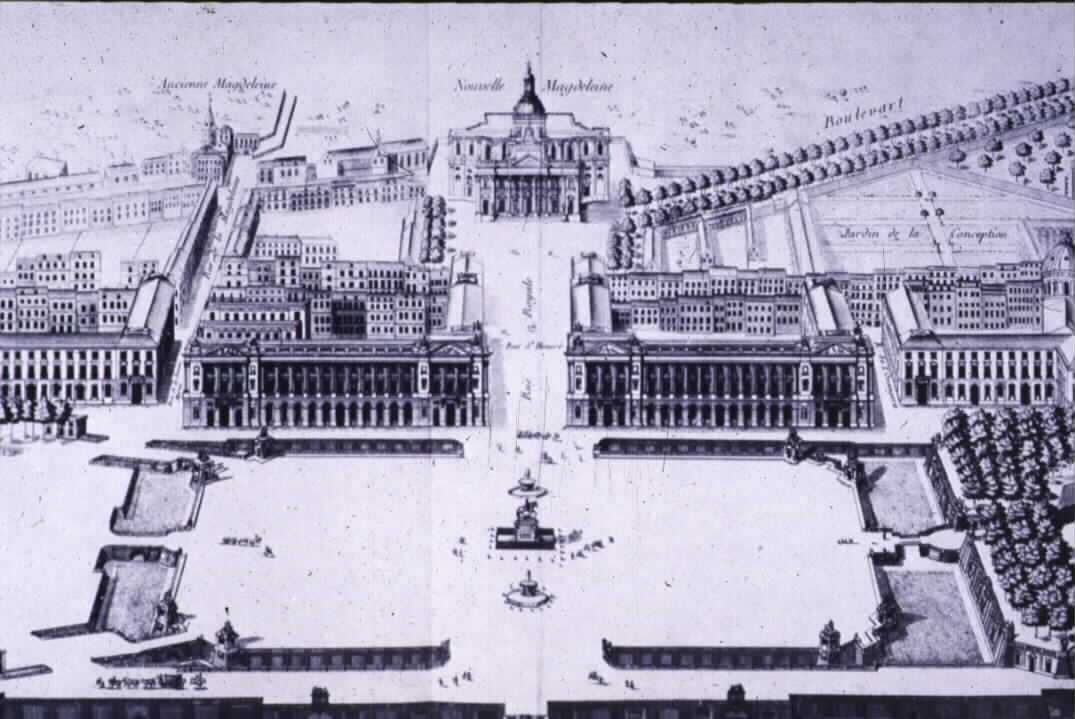
The project by Ange-Jacques Gabriel for Place Louis XV (1758)

The square was originally designed to be the site of an equestrian statue of King Louis XV, commissioned in 1748 by the merchants of Paris, to celebrate the recovery of King Louis XV from a serious illness. The site chosen for the statue was the large esplanade, or space between the revolving gate, the Tuileries Garden and the Cour-la-Reine, a popular lane for horseback riding at the edge of the city. At the time, the Concorde bridge and the Rue de Rivoli did not exist, and the Rue Royale was a muddy lane that descended down to a marsh beside the Seine.

The architect Ange-Jacques Gabriel made a plan for the site and the square was finished by 1772. It was in the form of an octagon, bordered by a sort of moat twenty meters wide, crossed by stone bridges, and surrounded by a stone balustrade. At the eight corners Gabriel placed stone stairways to descend into the square, which was divided into flowerbeds. In the center of the gardens was the pedestal on which the statue stood. The statue, by Edmé Bouchardon, depicted the King on horseback as the victor of the Battle of Fontenoy, dressed as a Roman general, with a laurel wreath on his head. On the four corners of the pedestal, designed by Jean-François Chalgrin, are bronze statues by Jean-Baptiste Pigalle, depicting the virtues of great monarchs; Force, Justice, Prudence, and Peace.

The statue was dedicated on 20 June 1763, but by this time the King had lost much of his popularity. A few days after its dedication, someone hung a placard on the statue, proclaiming: "Oh, the beautiful statue! Oh, the fine pedestal! The Virtues are under the feet, and Vice is in the saddle!"

On the north side of the square, between 1760 and 1775, Gabriel planned and built two palatial buildings with identical façades. The classical façades were inspired by those created by Claude Perrault, the royal architect, for the façade of the Louvre. They were originally intended to be occupied by embassies, but in the end the east building became a depot for the Royal furnishings, then the headquarters of the French Navy, the Hôtel de la Marine. The west building was divided into individual properties for the nobility.

=== French Revolution ===
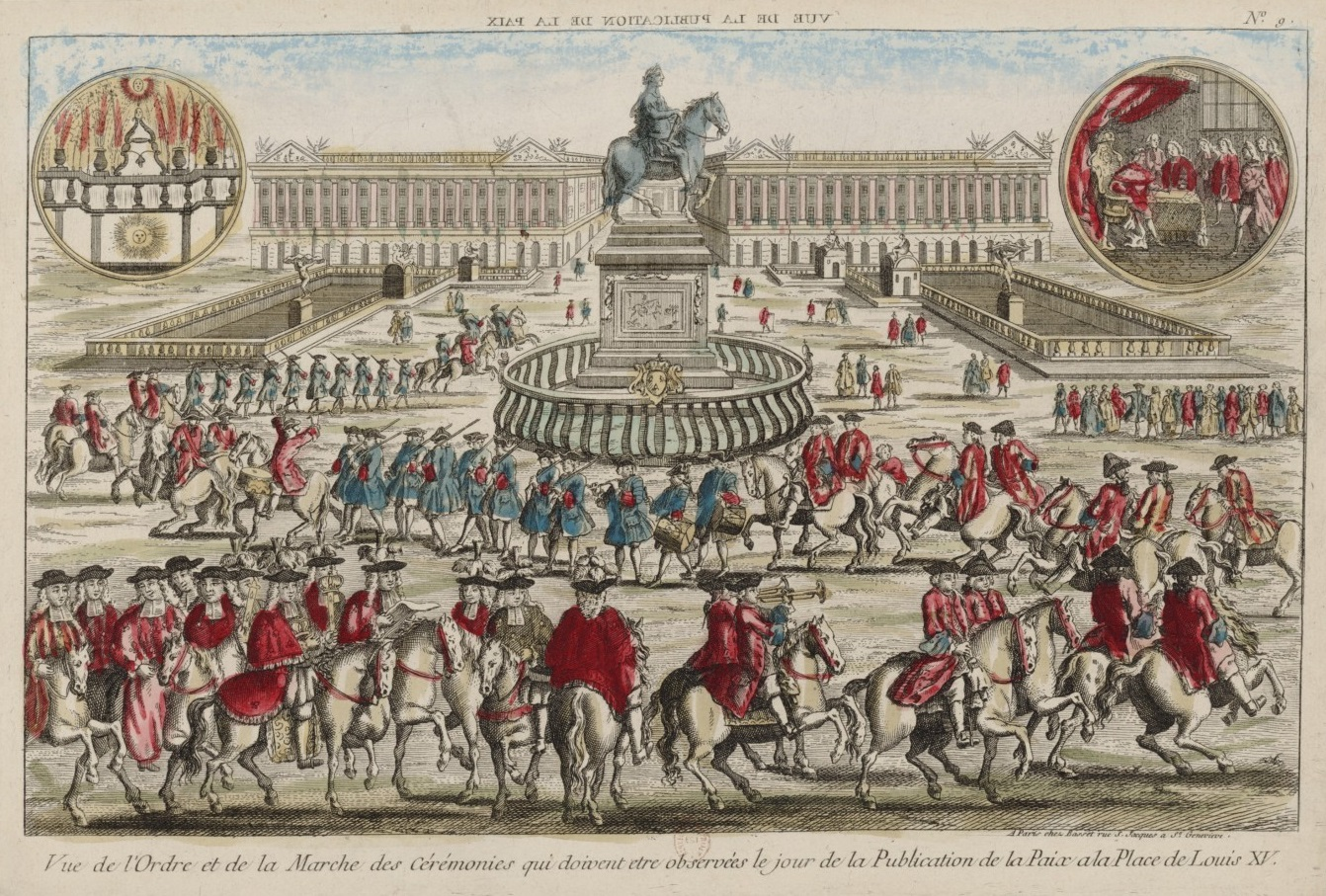
Ceremony on the Place Louis XV in 1763

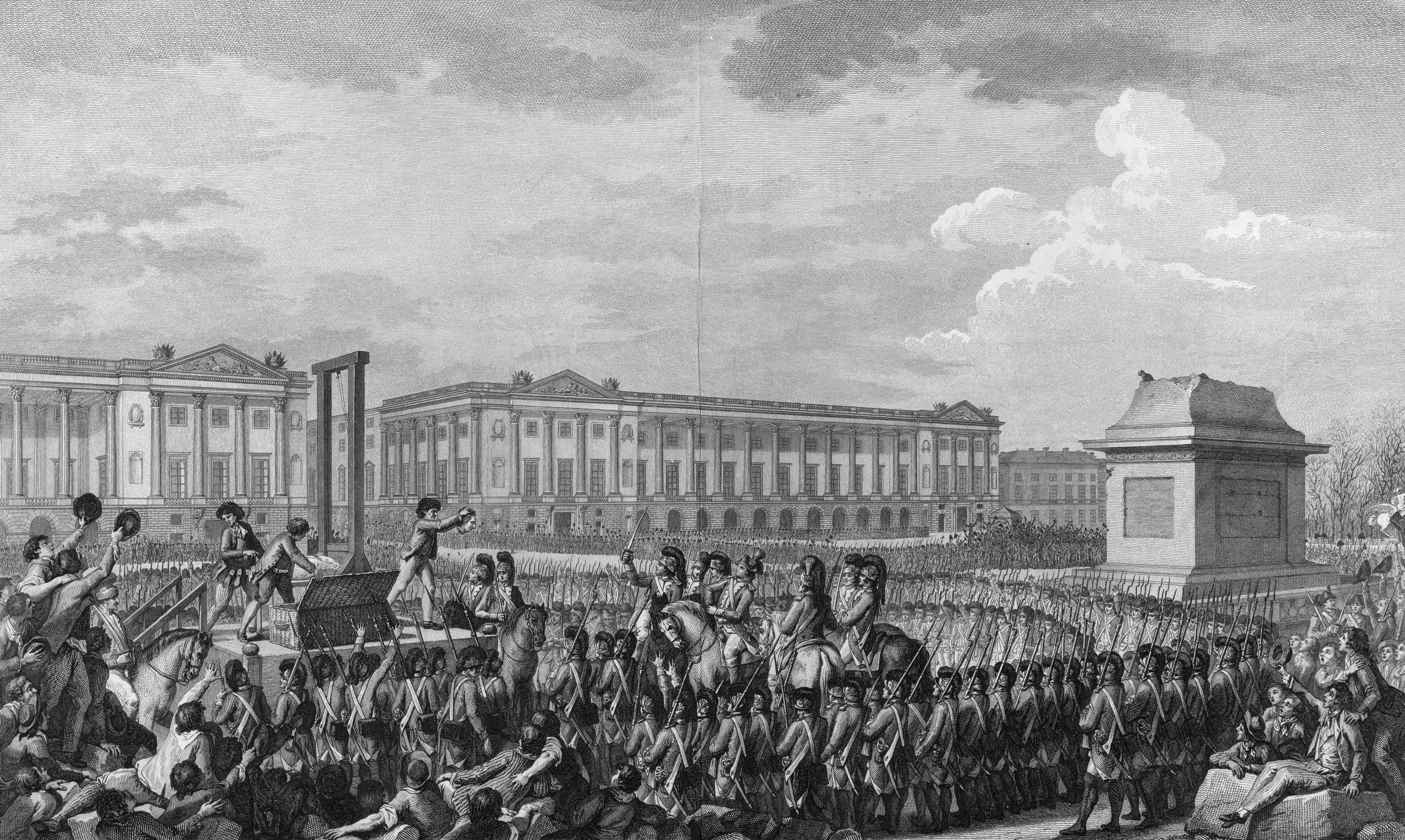
Execution of Louis XVI on the future Place de la Concorde on 21 January 1793

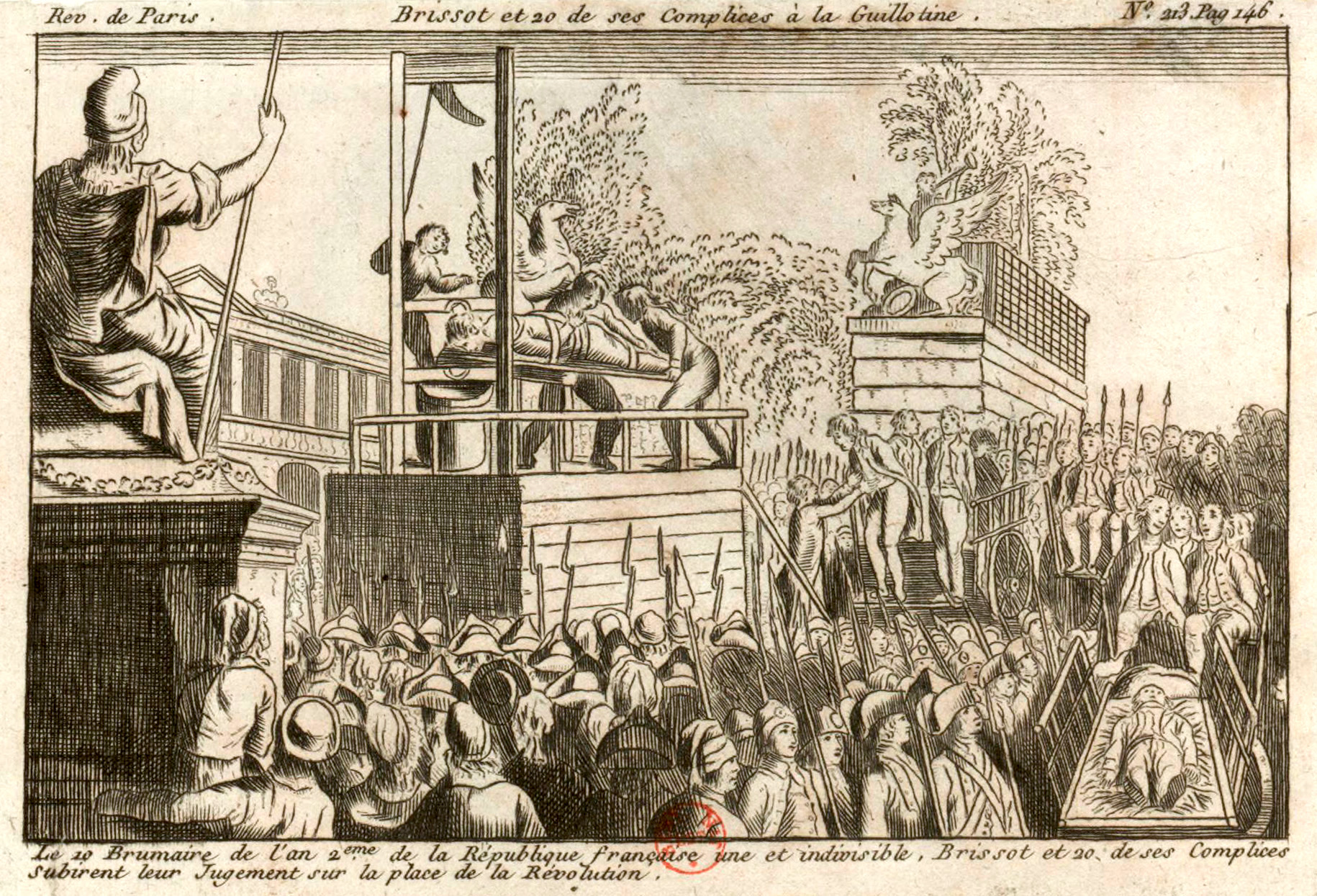
Execution of the Girondins on 31 October 1793

Beginning in 1789, the square was a central stage for the events of the French Revolution. On 13 July 1789, a mob came to the Hôtel de la Marine and seized a store of weapons, including two old cannons, gifts from the King of Siam, which fired the first shots during the storming of the Bastille on 14 July 1789. On 11 August 1792, the statue of Louis XV was pulled down and taken to a foundry, where it was melted down. A few months later, a new statue, "Liberty", by the sculptor François-Frédéric Lemot, took its place; it was a figure wearing a red liberty cap and holding a lance. The Place Louis XV ("Louis XV Square") became the Place de la Revolution ("Revolution Square").

In October 1792, the first executions by guillotine in the square took place. The two people who were executed were thieves who had stolen the royal crown diamonds from the Hotel de la Marine. On 21 January 1793, King Louis XVI was executed there, followed in the same year on 16 October by Queen Marie Antoinette. As the Reign of Terror commenced, the guillotine was set up again on 11 May 1793, midway between the Statue of Liberty and the turning bridge at the entrance to the Tuileries Garden, and remained there for thirteen months. Of the 2,498 persons guillotined in Paris during the Revolution, 1,119 were executed on the Place de la Concorde, 73 on the Place de la Bastille and 1,306 on the Place de la Nation. Besides Louis XVI and Marie Antoinette, others executed on the same site included Charlotte Corday and Madame du Barry. During the later days of the Reign of Terror in 1794, Georges Danton, Camille Desmoulins, Antoine Lavoisier, Maximilien Robespierre, and Louis de Saint-Just were executed there. The last executions, those of the Prairial riot participants, were carried out on the Place de la Concorde in May 1795.

=== 18th and 19th century: Monuments and fountains ===
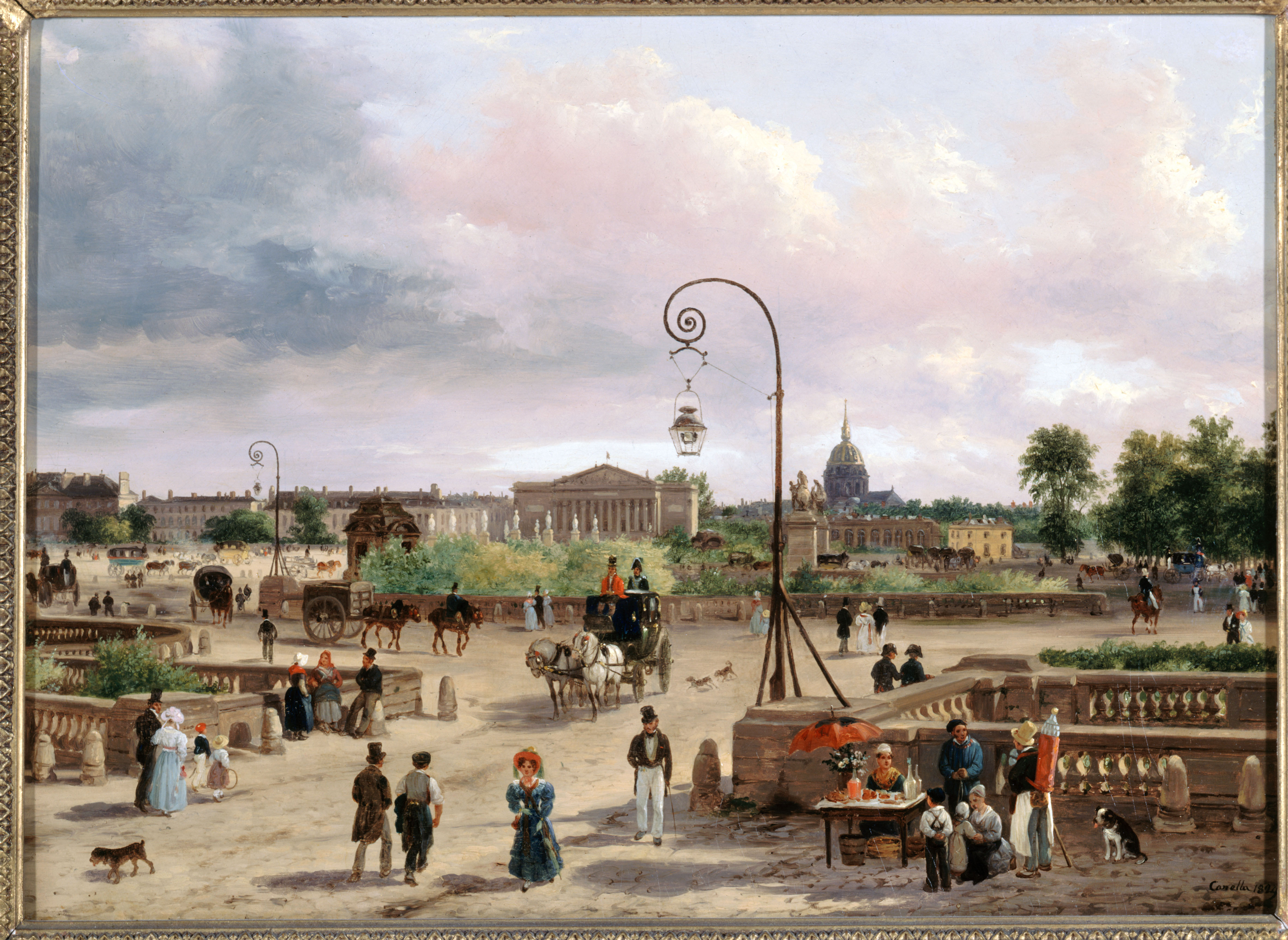
The Place de la Concorde in 1829, before the modifications by King Louis-Philippe

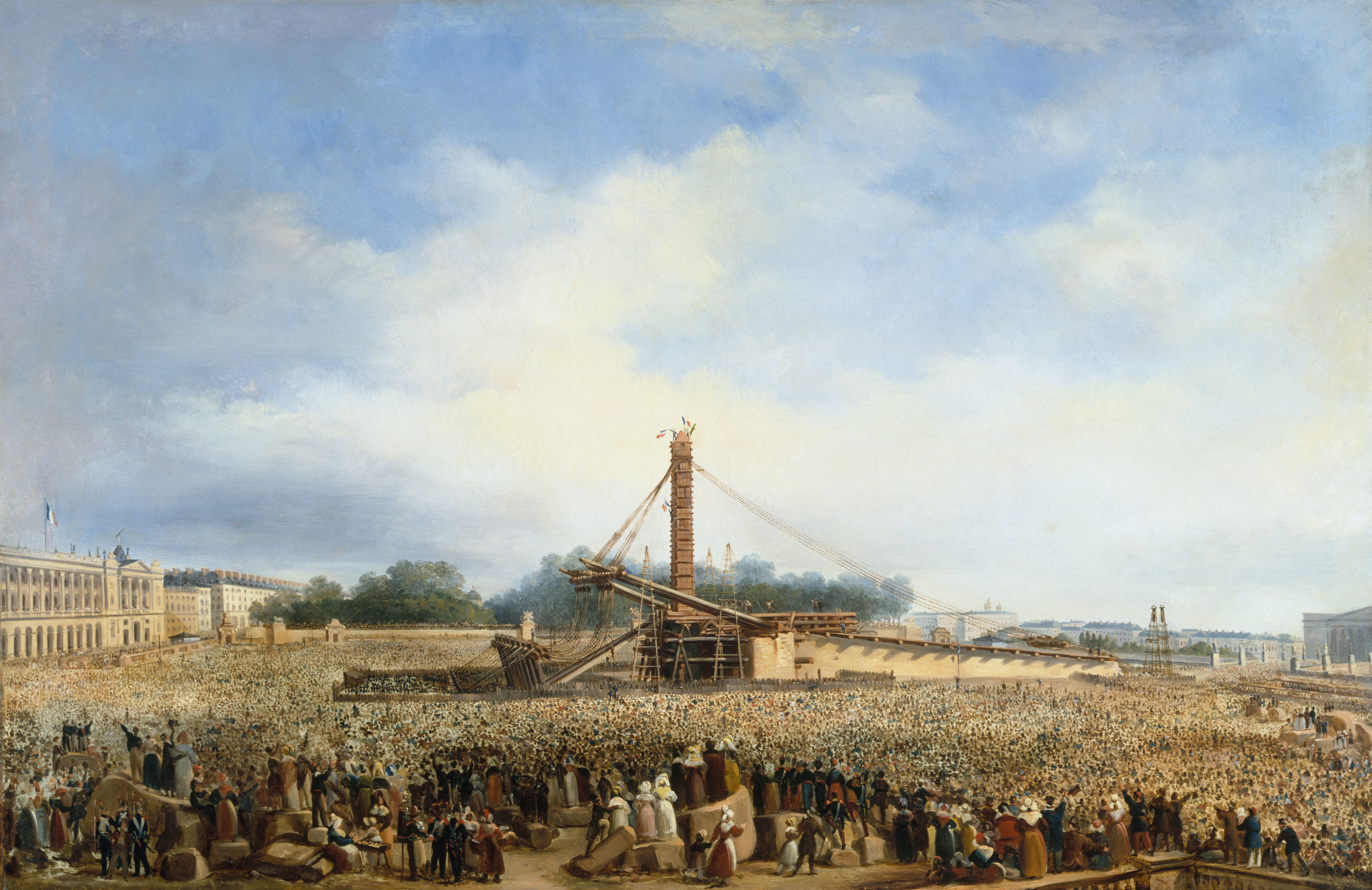
The erection of the Luxor Monument, 25 October 1836

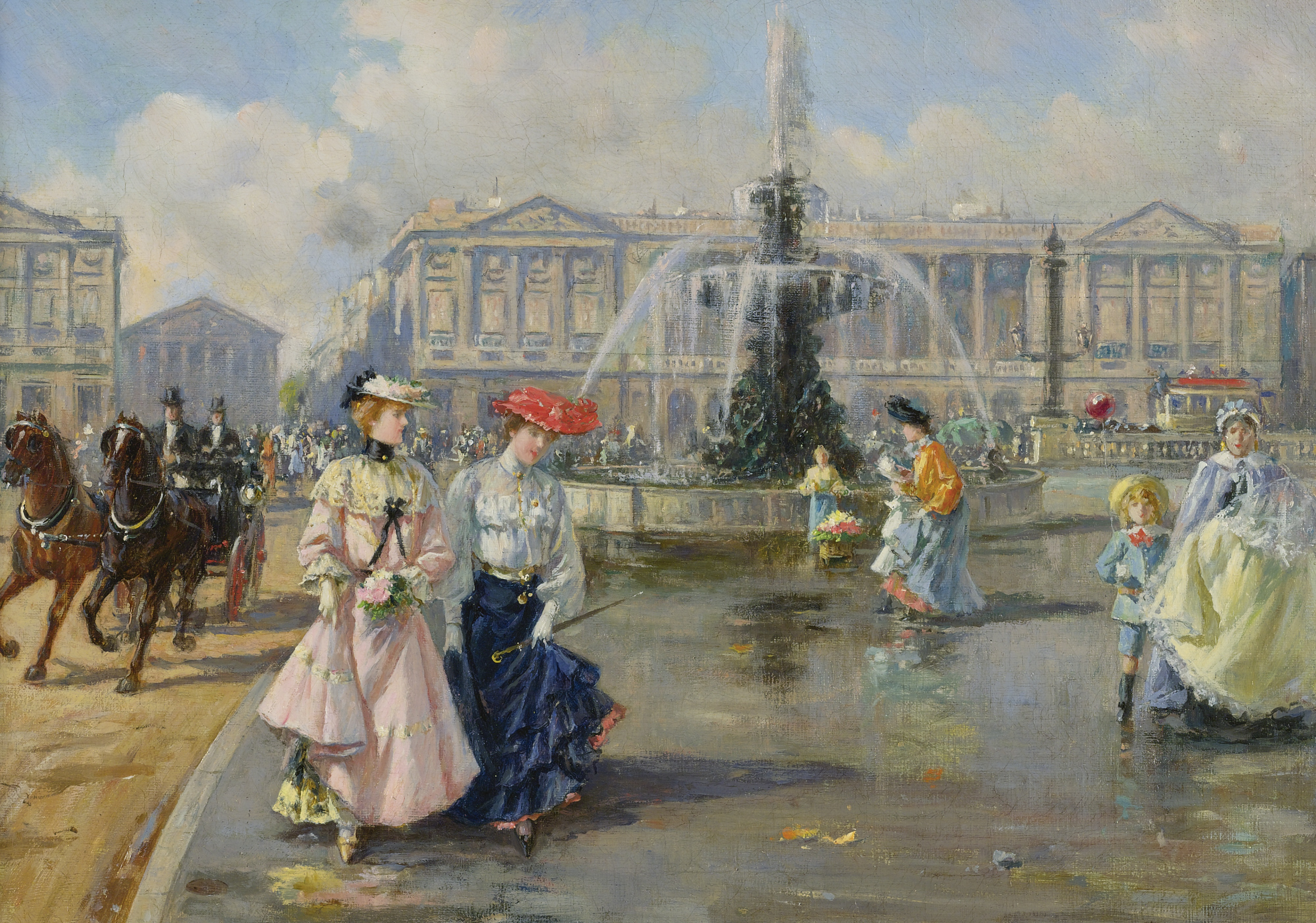
The square in 1872

In 1795, under the Directory, the square was renamed the Place de la Concorde ("Concord Square") as a gesture of reconciliation after the turmoil of the revolution. After the Bourbon Restoration of 1814, the name was changed back to the Place Louis XV, and in 1826 the square was renamed the Place Louis XVI ("Louis XVI Square"). After the July Revolution of 1830, the name was returned to the Place de la Concorde.

In 1791, early in the French Revolution, the Concorde bridge was completed. Later, at the suggestion of Jacques-Louis David, the statues of the Marly Horses by Guillaume Coustou the Elder were placed on the west side, at the entrance of the Champs-Élysées. In 1806, Napoleon Bonaparte began to construct the Rue de Rivoli along the edge of the square.

Under King Louis-Philippe and his prefect of the Seine, Claude-Philibert Barthelot de Rambuteau, the square was remade. In 1832, Jacques Ignace Hittorff was named chief architect of the project. In October 1835 Hittorff installed the new centrepiece of the square, the Luxor Obelisk, a gift to the King from the wali Muhammad Ali of Egypt. It was hoisted into place, before a huge crowd, on 25 October 1836. Hittorff commissioned celebrated sculptors, including James Pradier and Jean-Pierre Cortot to make eight statues representing the major cities of France, which were placed in 1838 on columns which had earlier been put in place around the square by Gabriel. These statues form something of a rudimentary map, such that when viewing the Place de la Concorde from a birdseye perspective, the north-eastern states represent north-eastern cities, in the appropriate arrangement relative to one another, and so on. A ring of twenty columns with lanterns were put in place during the same time.

Between 1836 and 1840, Hittorff erected two monumental fountains, the Fontaine Maritime to the side of the Seine, and the Fontaine Fluviale to the side of the Rue Royale. The design, consisting of two fountains each nine meters high, was modeled after that of the fountains of St. Peter's Square in Rome. In 1853, under Napoleon III, the deep moats around the square, which had turned into rendez-vous points for prostitutes, were filled in.

=== 20th century: Expositions, occupation and triumphs ===
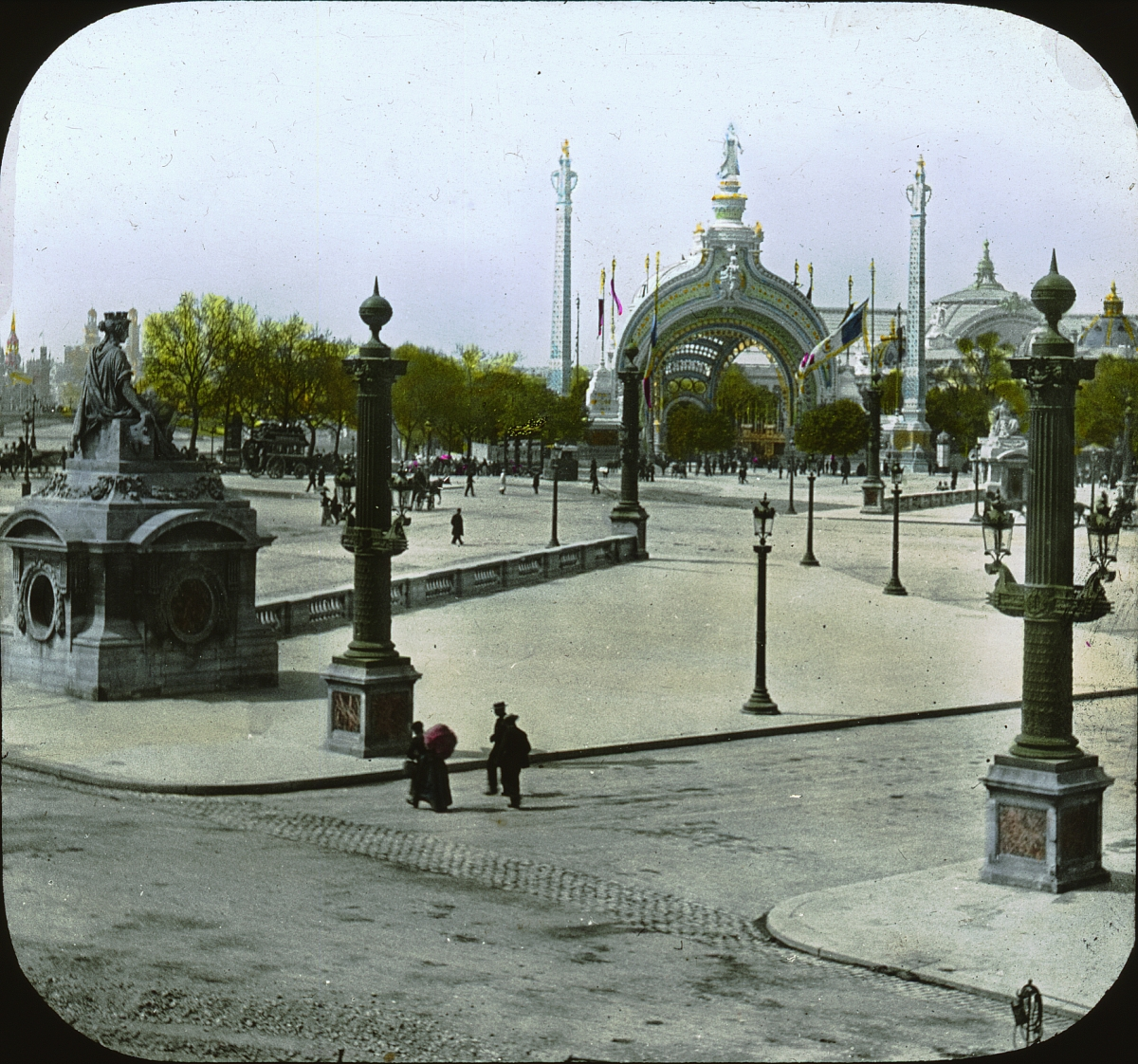
Entrance to 1900 Paris Exposition, whose vestiges include the Grand Palais

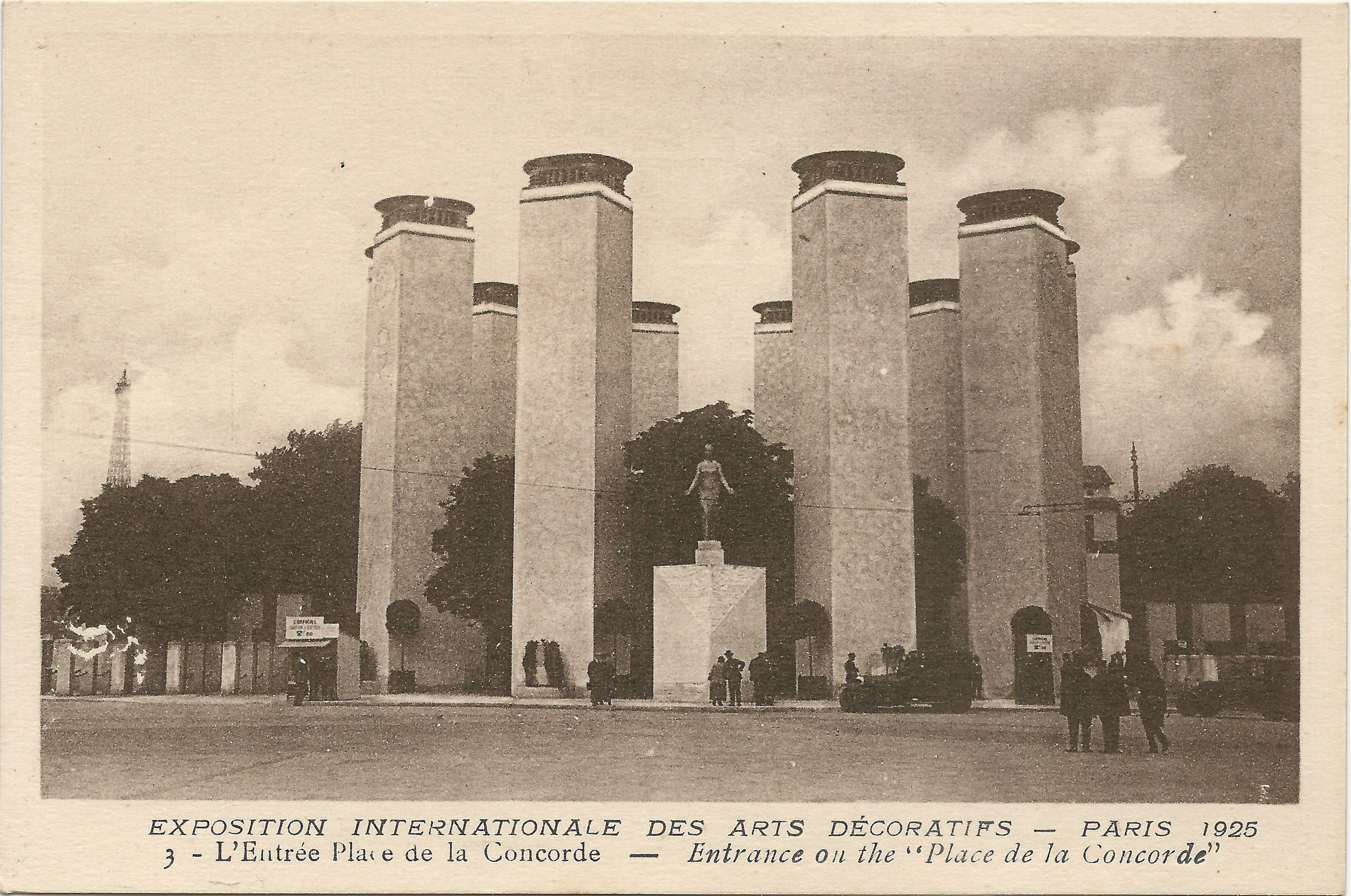
Entrance to the International Exhibition of Modern Decorative and Industrial Arts in 1925, which gave its name to "Art Deco"

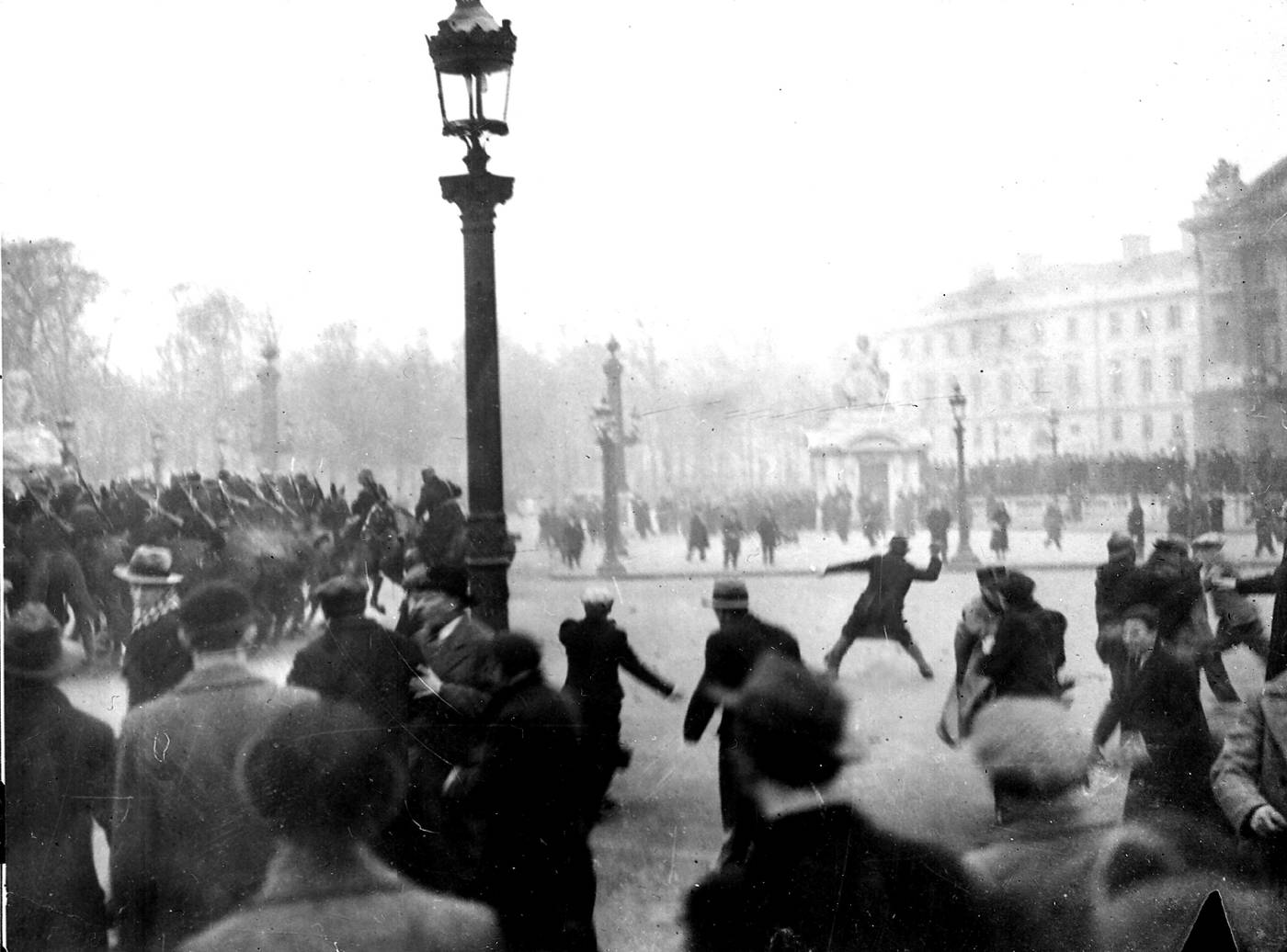
A demonstration against parliamentary corruption in 1934 led to a riot, causing eleven deaths and two hundred injured.

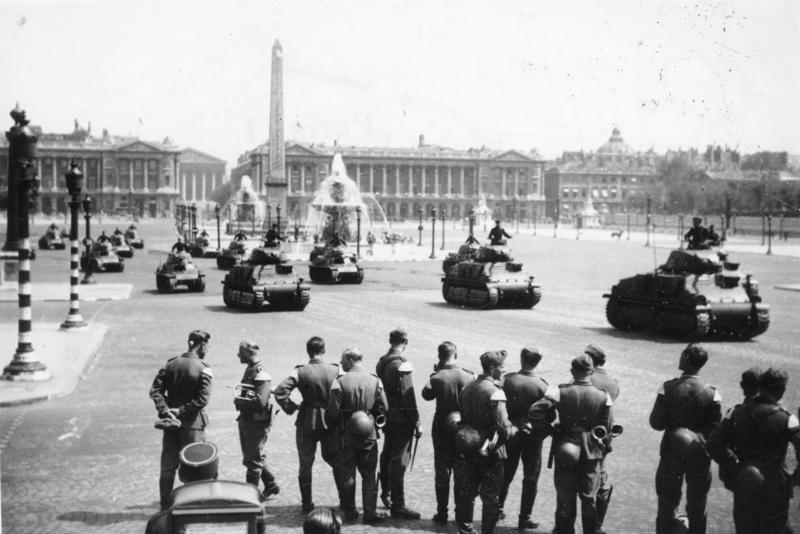
Captured French SOMUA S35 in German service parade on the square in 1941

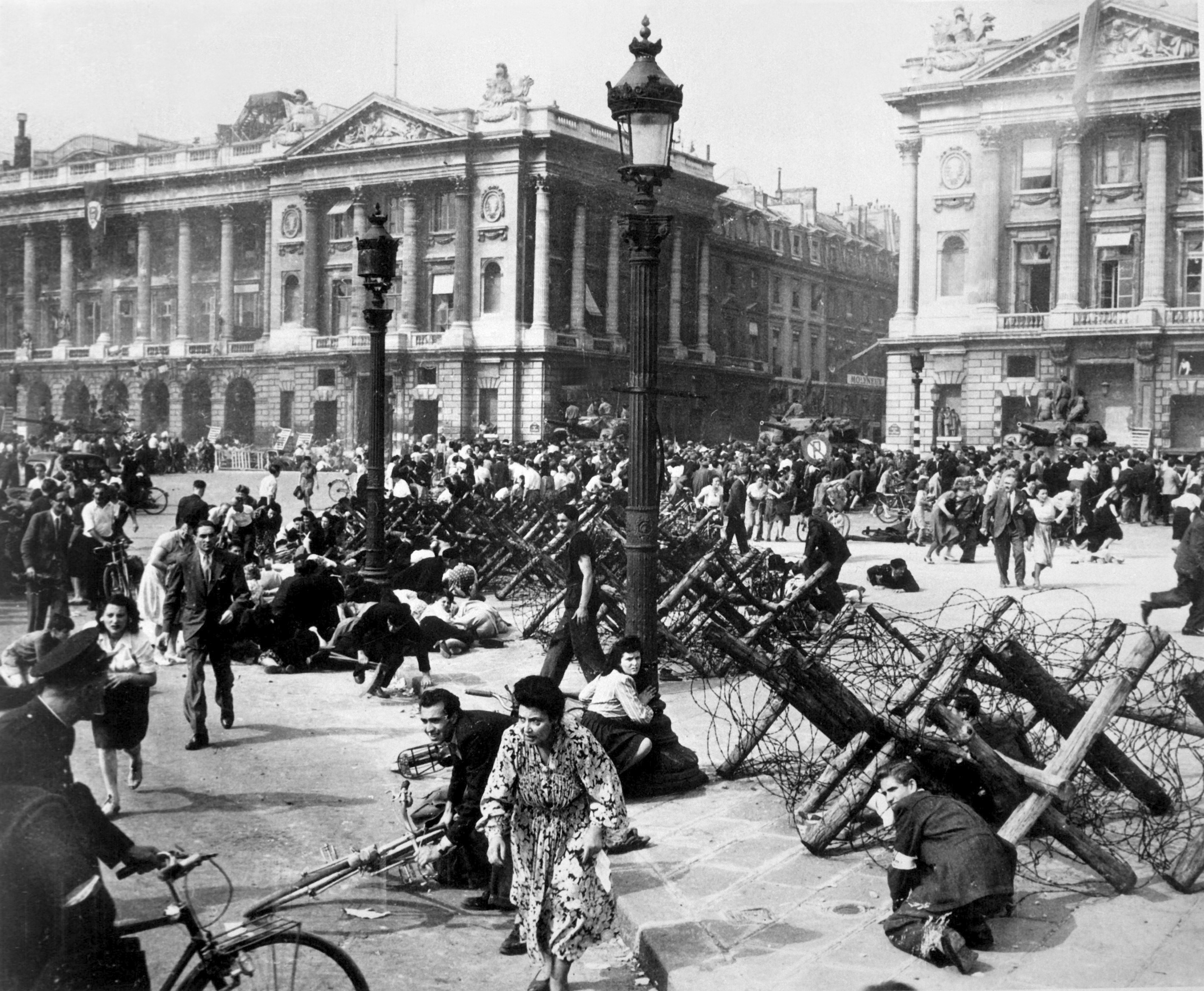
Crowds celebrating the liberation of Paris scatter from German sniper fire August 1944. Rue Royale is in the background.

The square was the entry point of two major international expositions: the Paris Universal Exposition of 1900, which left behind the Grand Palais and the Petit Palais, and the 1925 International Exhibition of Modern Decorative and Industrial Arts, which gave its name to the Art Deco architectural style of the 20th century. It was also the site of great national celebrations, including the victory celebrations of the end of the First World War and the Liberation of Paris in the Second World War. It experienced violent confrontations. A far-right demonstration in 1934 turned violent, with eleven deaths and two hundred injured. It also hosted triumphant celebrations of sporting events such as the French national team's victory in the 1998 FIFA World Cup.

=== 21st century: Olympic and Paralympic Games, removal of traffic ===
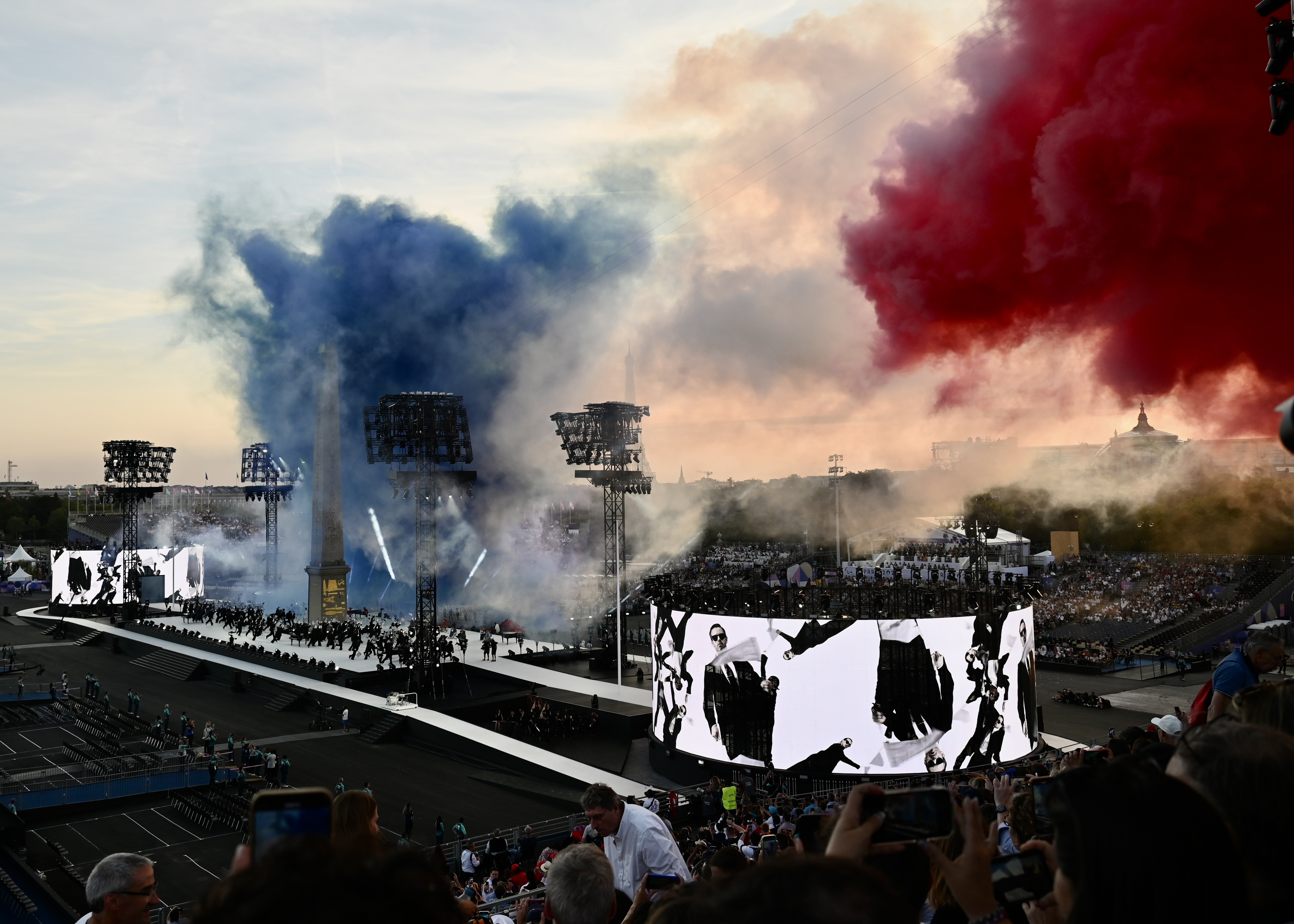
Opening ceremony of the Paralympic Games in August 2024

The square continues to be the location for the focal point of the Bastille Day military parade down the Champs-Élysées, with the President of France and invited guests watching the parade from the square.

In 2024, the square was the venue for 4 sports at the 2024 Summer Olympics (BMX freestyle, Breaking, Skateboarding and Basketball 3x3), as well as the venue for the opening ceremony of the Paralympic Games. Temporary stands and sporting facilities were built, while protecting items such as the Luxor Obelisk. Over 25,000 people attended the square each day during the Olympics, and the Paralympics opening ceremony was watched by 35,000 people in the square.

Following the Games, vehicle traffic did not return to the majority of the square, after Anne Hidalgo, the Mayor of Paris announced a partial pedestrianisation of the square in January 2024, with plans for a substantial redesign of the square in future.

== Description ==
=== Luxor Obelisk ===
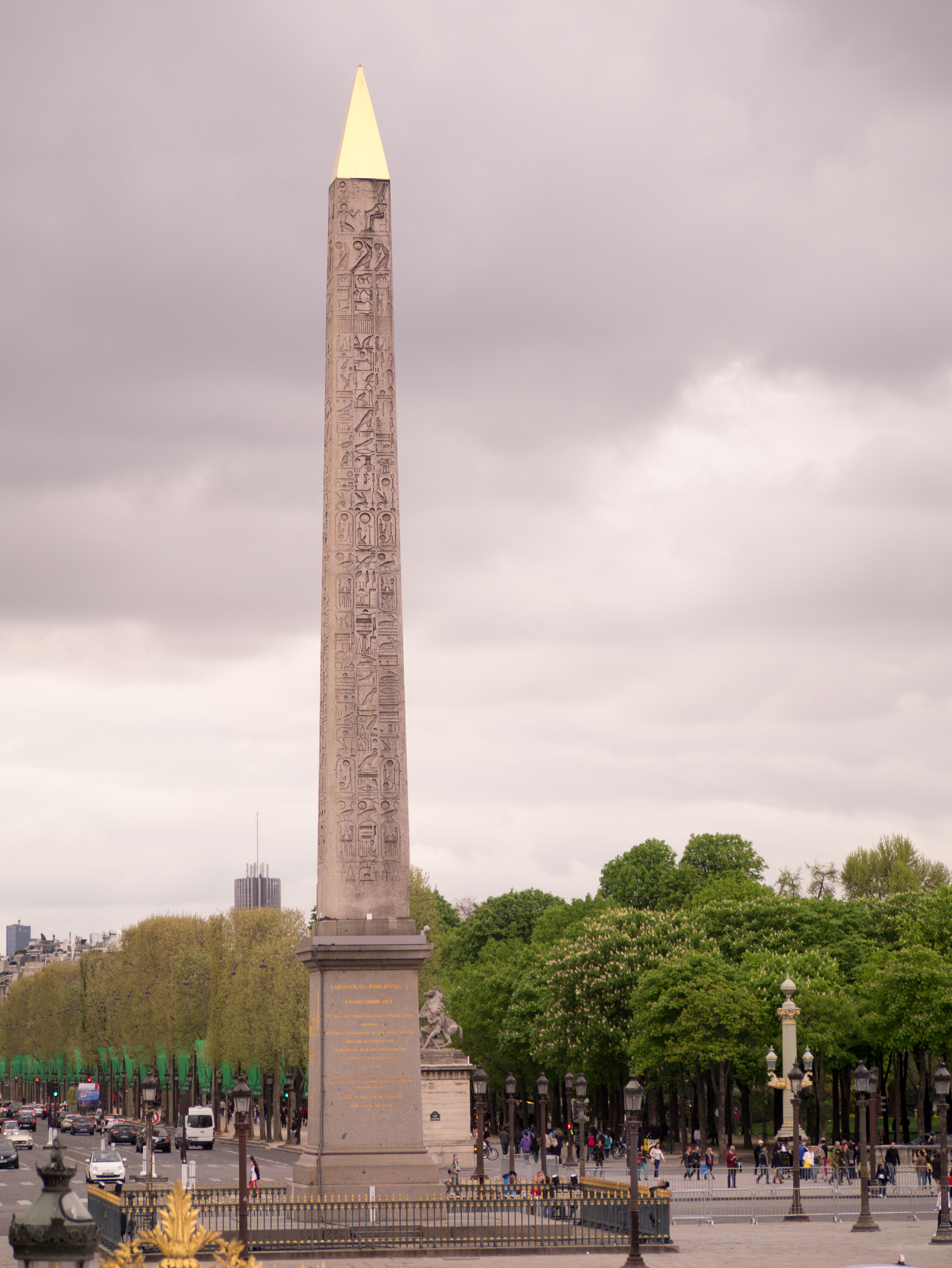
The Luxor Obelisk

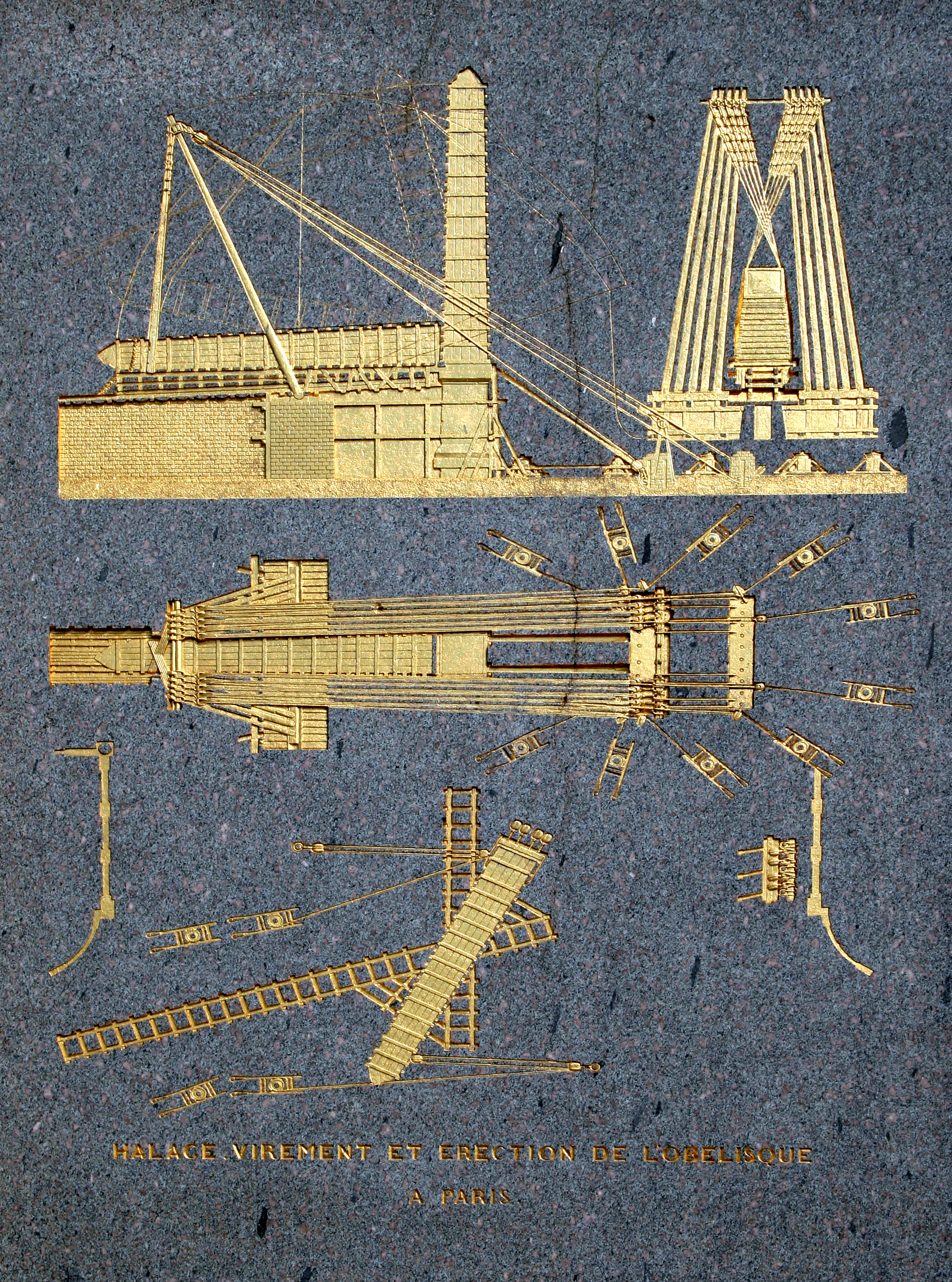
Illustration on the base of the obelisk, showing how it was raised into place in 1836

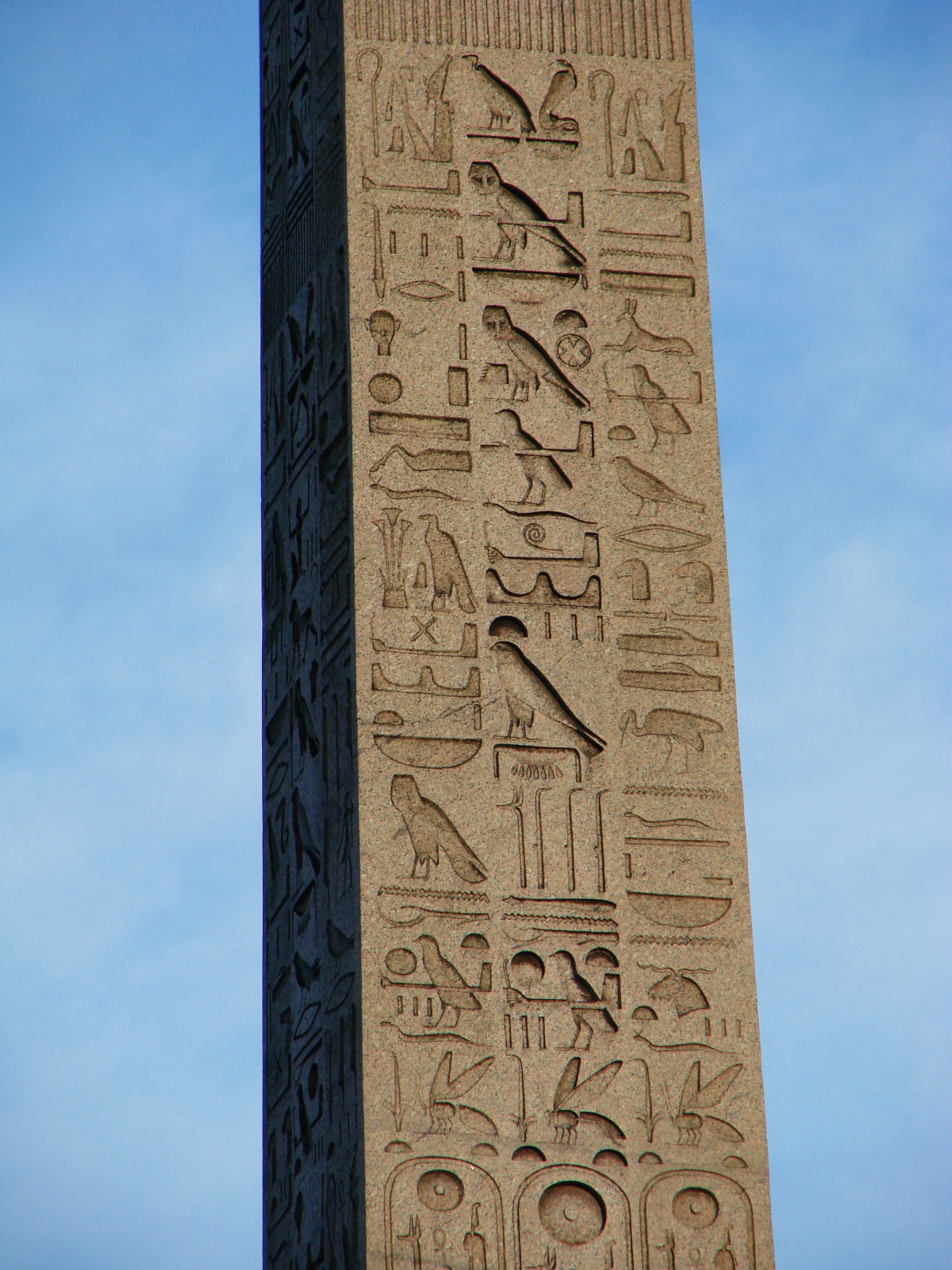
Hieroglyphs on the obelisk.

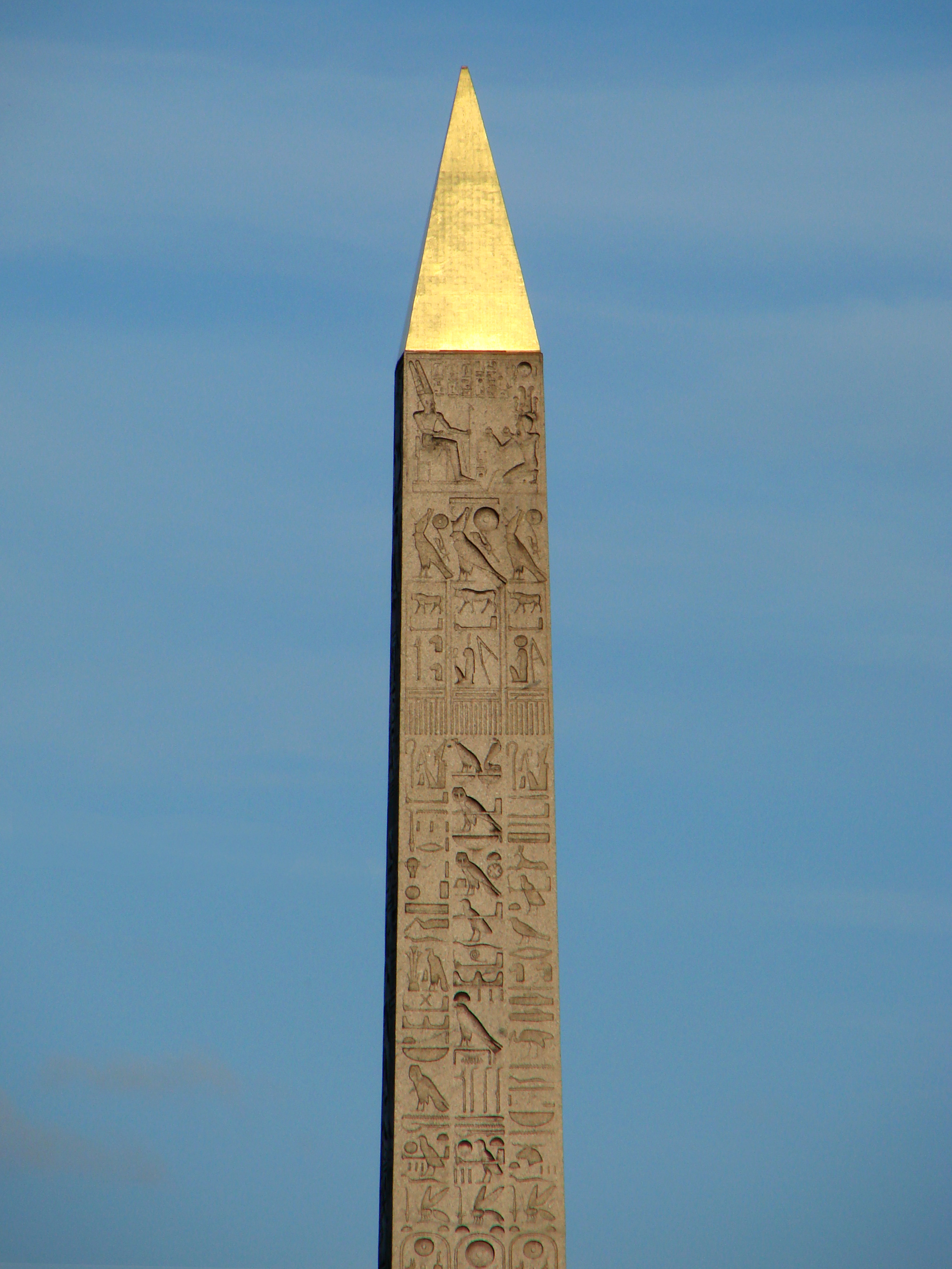
Hieroglyphs on the upper obelisk. The Pharaoh on his throne is portrayed at the top

The centrepiece of the Place de la Concorde is an ancient Egyptian obelisk decorated with hieroglyphics exalting the reign of the pharaoh Ramesses II. It is one of two which the Egyptian government gave to the French in the 19th century. The other one stayed in Egypt, too difficult and heavy to move to France with the technology at that time. On 26 September 1981 President François Mitterrand formally returned the title of the second obelisk to Egypt.

The obelisk once marked the entrance to the Luxor Temple. The wali (hereditary governor) of Egypt, Muhammad Ali Pasha, offered the 3,300-year-old Luxor Obelisk as a diplomatic gift to France in 1829. It arrived in Paris on 21 December 1833. Three years later, it was hoisted into place, on top of the pedestal which originally supported the statue of Louis XV, destroyed during the Revolution. The raising of the column was a major feat of engineering, depicted by illustrations on the base of the monument. King Louis Philippe dedicated the obelisk on 25 October 1836.

The obelisk, a yellow granite column, rises 23 metres (75 ft) high, including the base, and weighs over 250 tonnes (280 short tons). Given the technical limitations of the day, transporting it was no easy feat – on the pedestal are drawn diagrams explaining the machinery that was used for the transportation. In 1998, the government of France added a gold-leafed pyramidal cap to the top of the obelisk, replacing the missing original, believed stolen in the 6th century BC.

=== Fountains ===
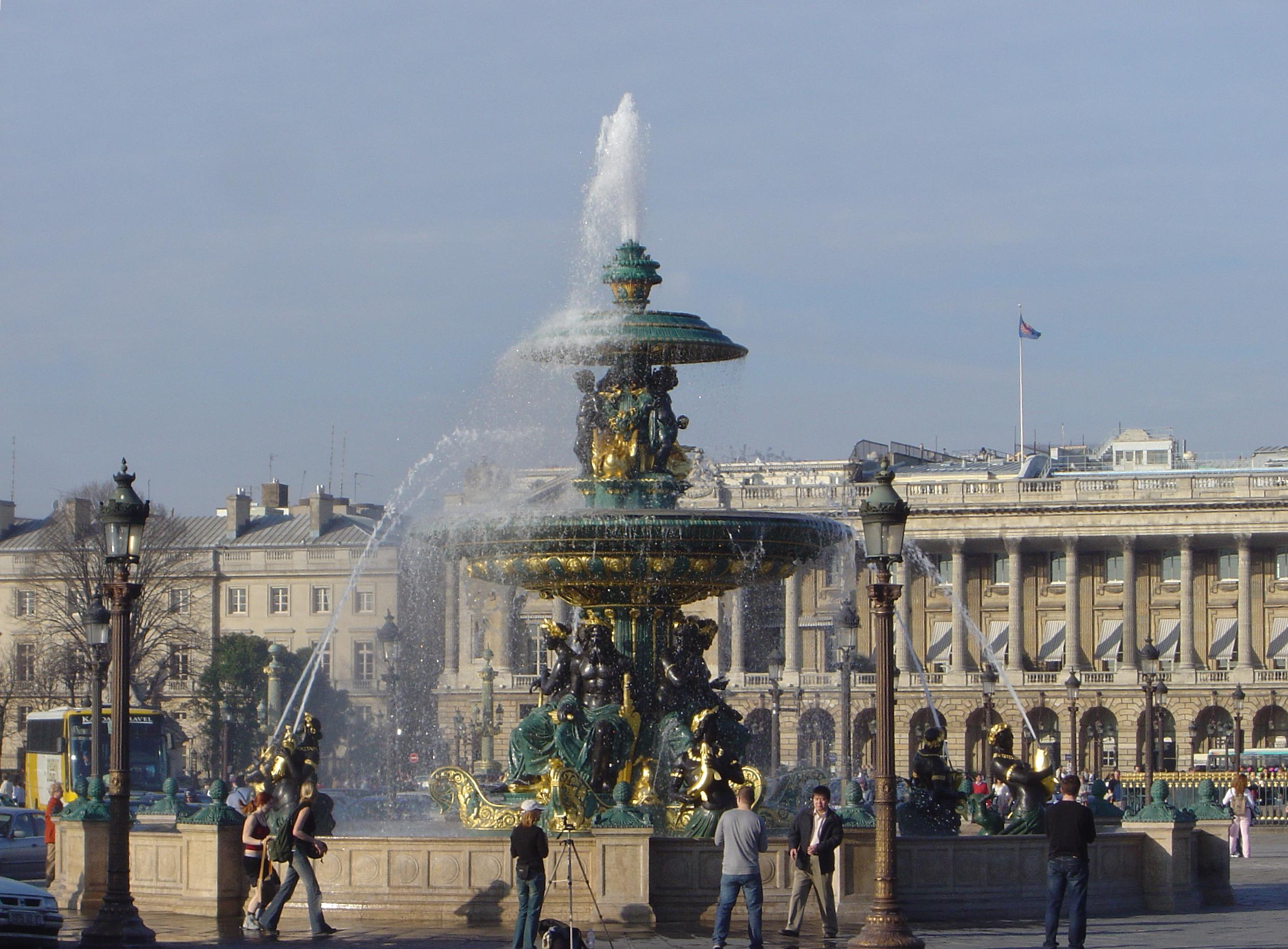
The Fountain of River Commerce and Navigation, one of the two Fontaines de la Concorde (1840)

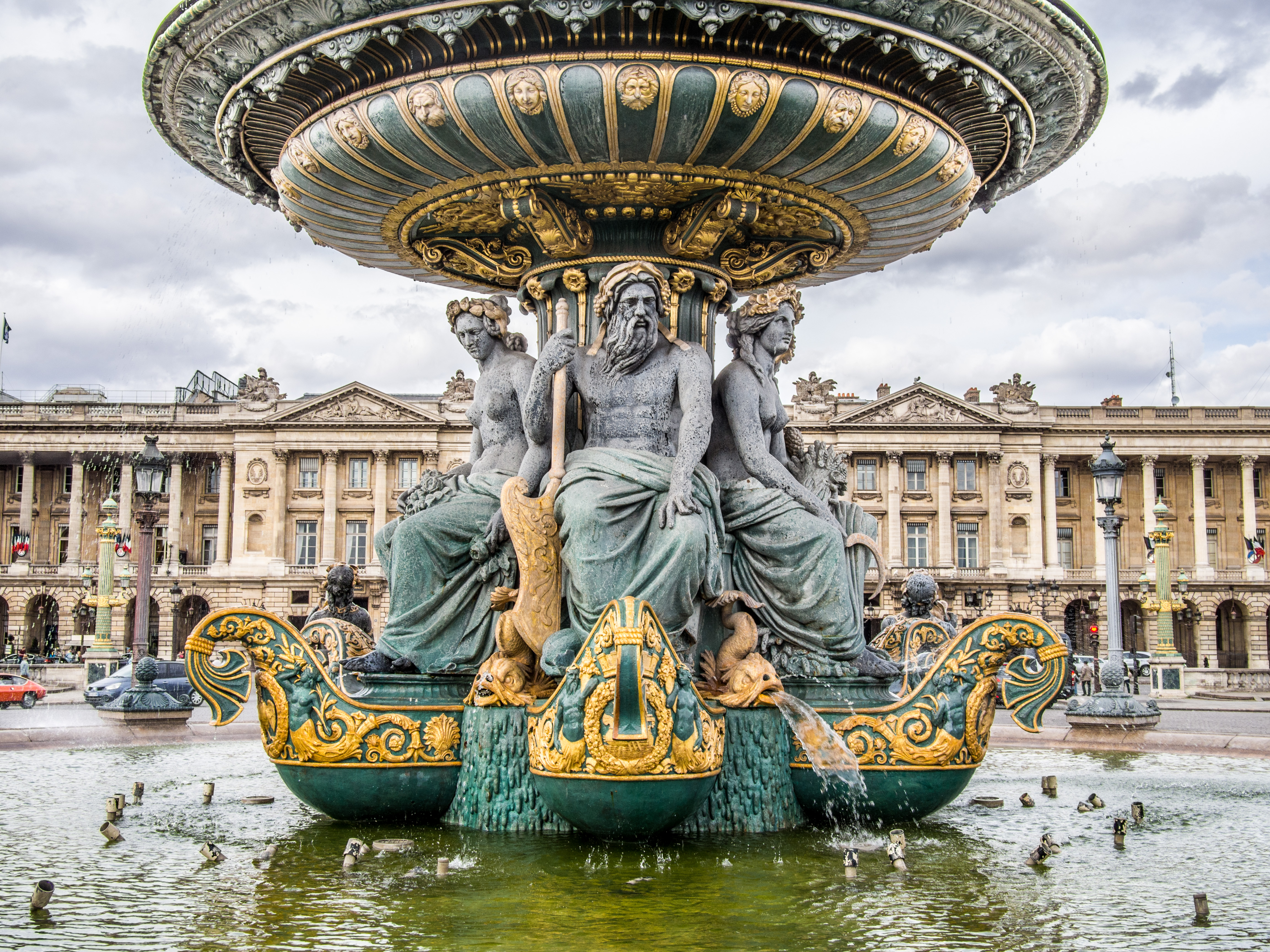
Base of the Fountain of River Commerce and Navigation

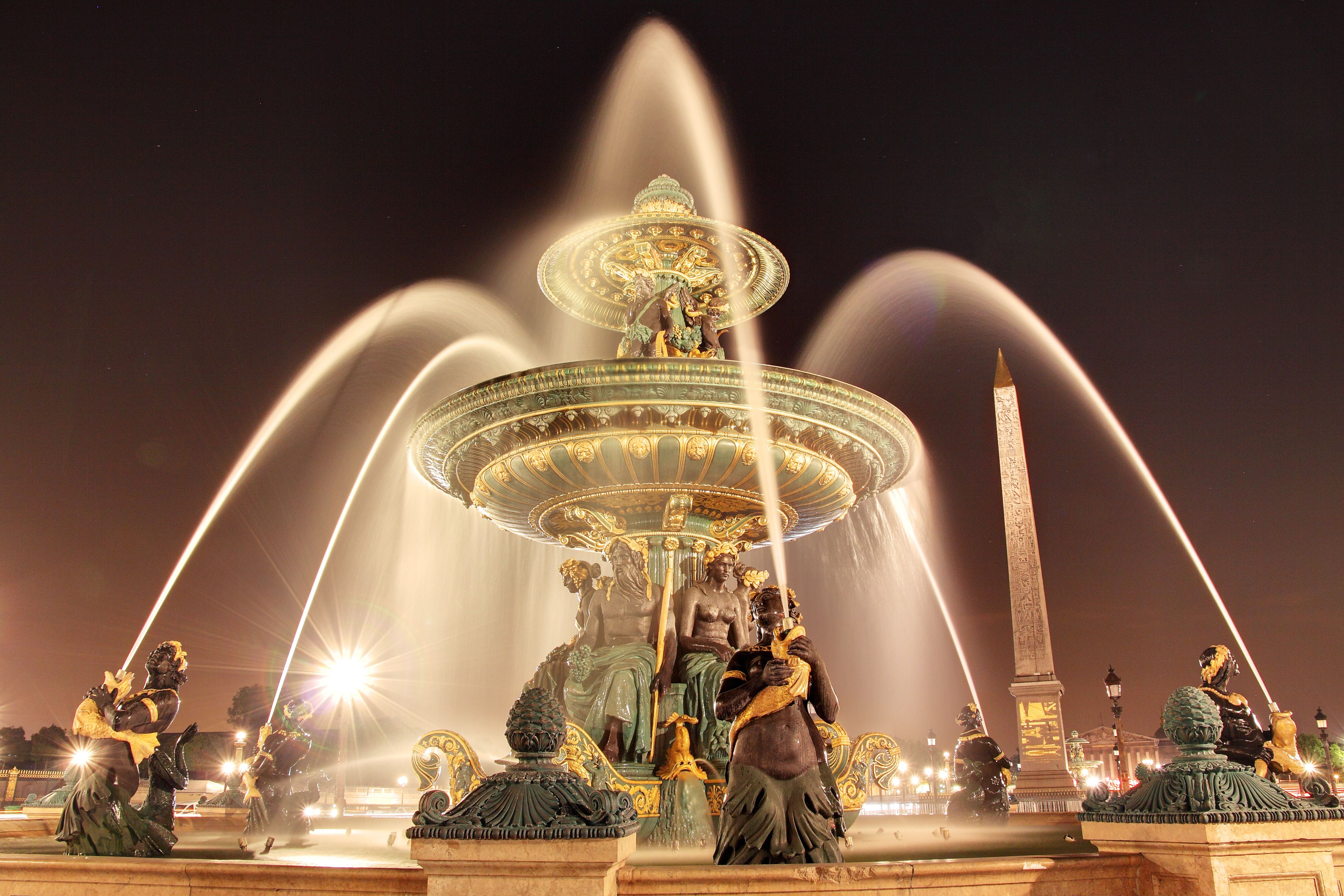
The Fountain of River Commerce at night

When he had completed the installation of the Luxor Obelisk, in 1836, Jacques-Ignace Hittorff, chief architect of the square, moved ahead with two new fountains to complement the obelisk. Hittorff had been a student of the Neoclassical designer Charles Percier at the École des Beaux-Arts. He had spent two years studying the architecture and fountains of Rome, particularly the Piazza Navona and Piazza San Pietro, each of which had obelisks aligned with fountains.

Hittorff's fountains were each nine meters high, matching the height of the earlier columns and statues around the square representing great French cities. The Maritime Fountain was on the south, between the obelisk and Seine, and illustrated the seas bordering France, while the Fluvial Fountains or river fountain, on the north, between the Obelisk and the Rue Royale, illustrated the great rivers of France. It is located in the same place where the guillotine which executed Louis XVI had been placed.

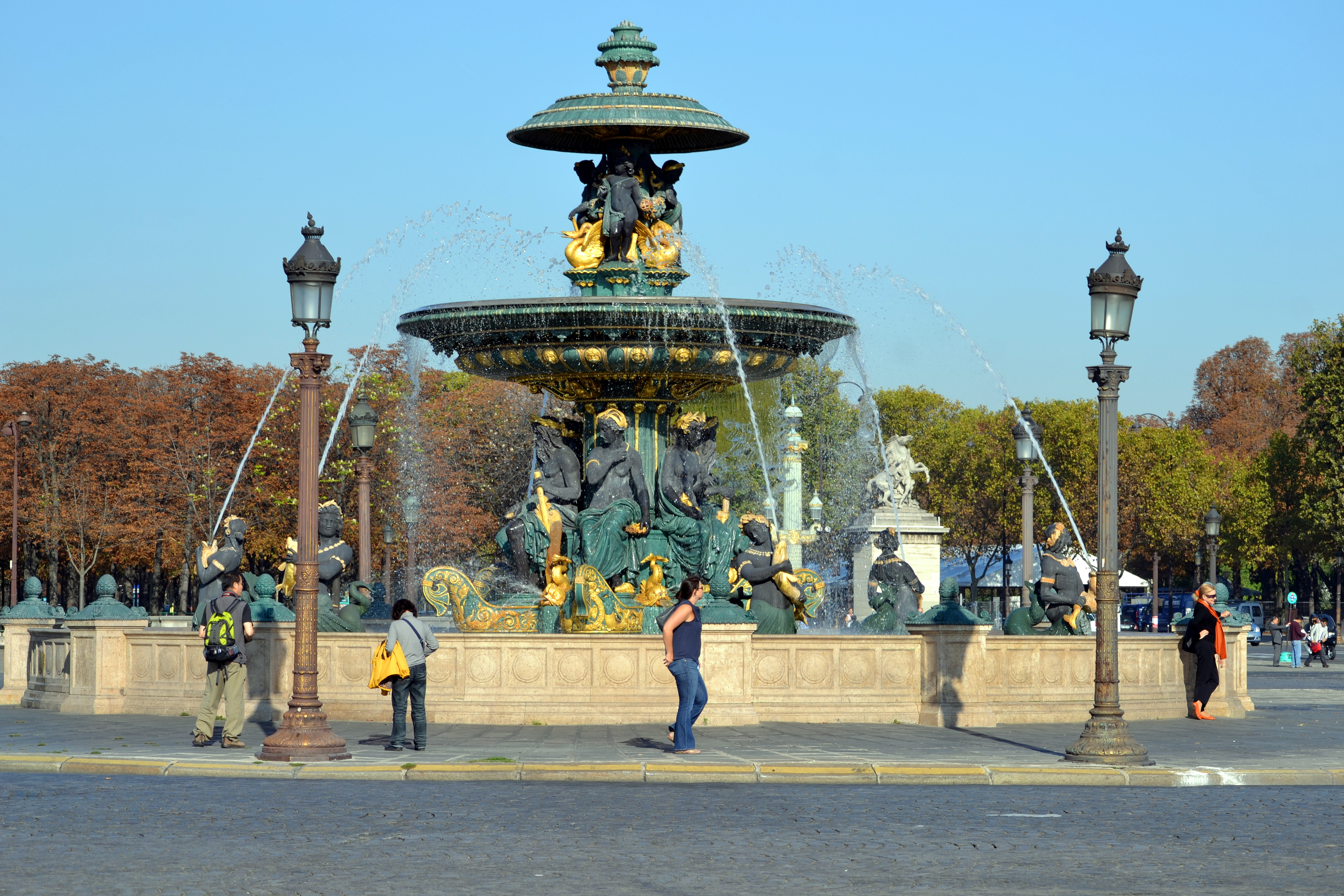
Fountain of the Seas

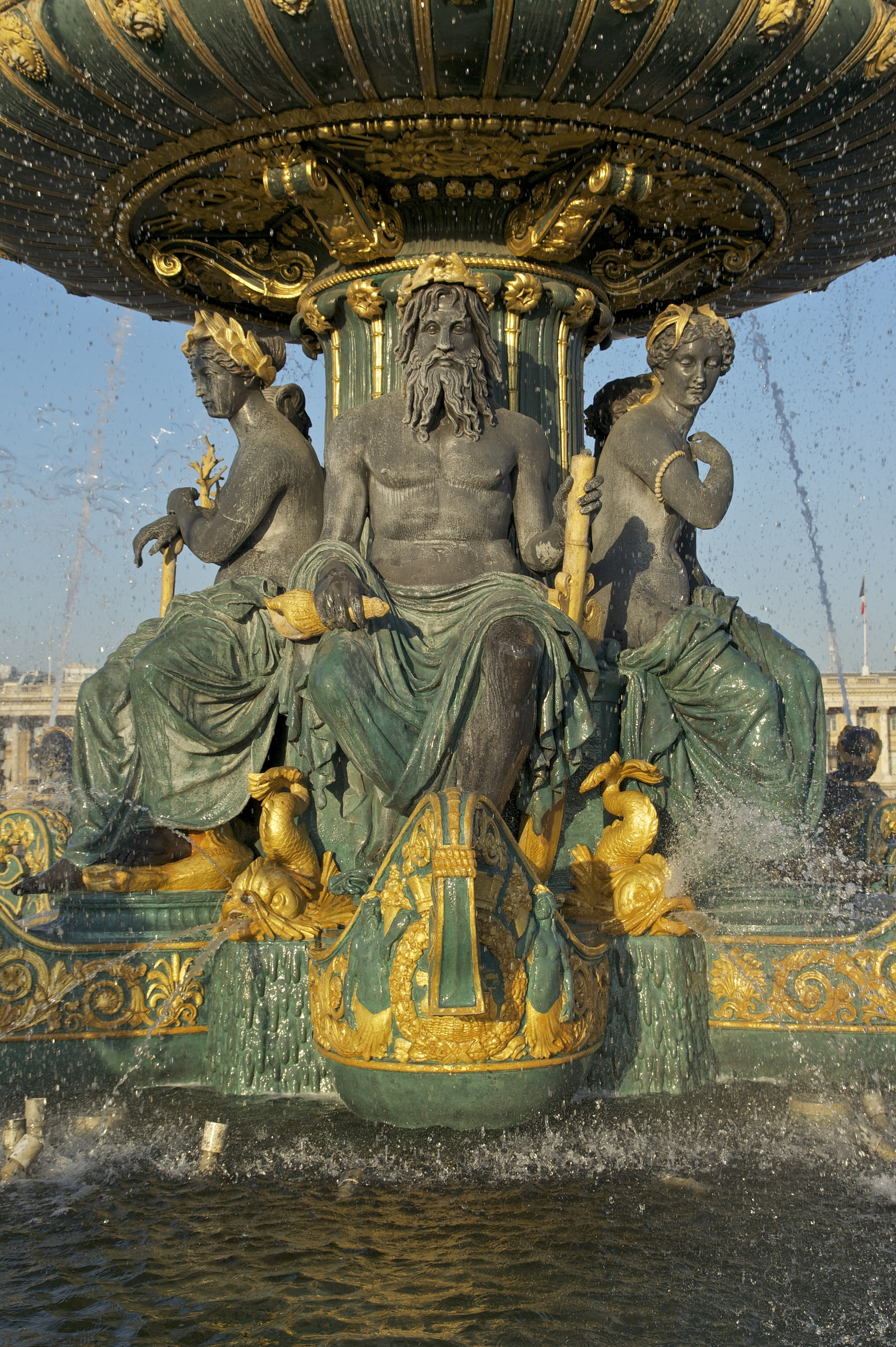
Base of the Fountain of the Seas

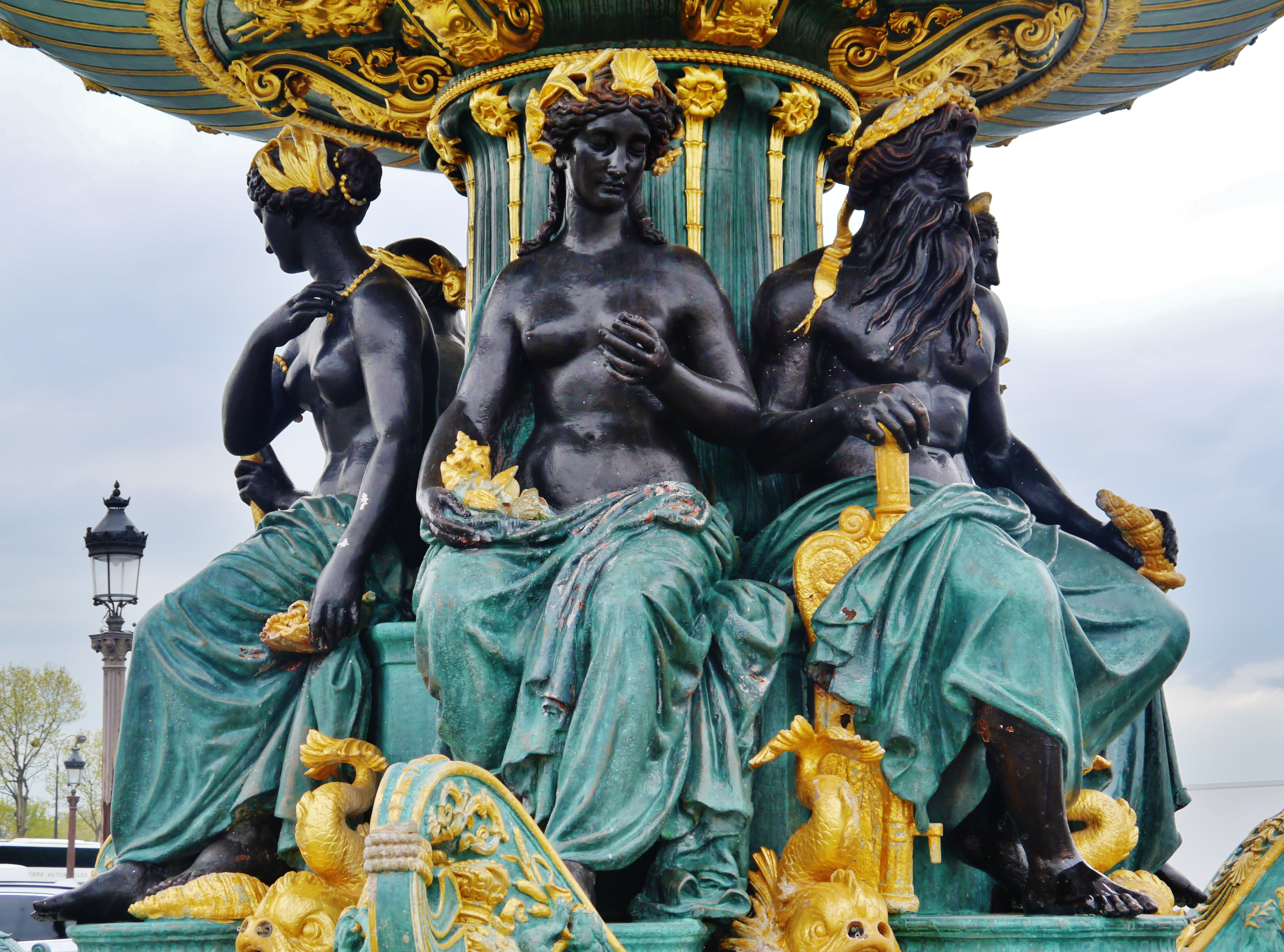
Detail of the Fountain of the Seas

Both fountains had the same form: a stone basin; six figures of tritons or naiads holding fish spouting water; six seated allegorical figures, their feet on the prows of ships, supporting the pedestal, of the circular vasque; four statues of different forms of genius in arts or crafts supporting the upper inverted upper vasque; whose water shot up and then cascaded down to the lower vasque and then the basin.

The north fountain was devoted to the Rivers, with allegorical figures representing the Rhone and the Rhine, the arts of the harvesting of flowers and fruits, harvesting and grape growing; and the geniuses of river navigation, industry, and agriculture.

The south fountain, closer to the Seine, represented the seas, with figures representing the Atlantic and the Mediterranean; harvesting coral; harvesting fish; collecting shellfish; collecting pearls; and the geniuses of astronomy, navigation, and commerce.

=== North side ===
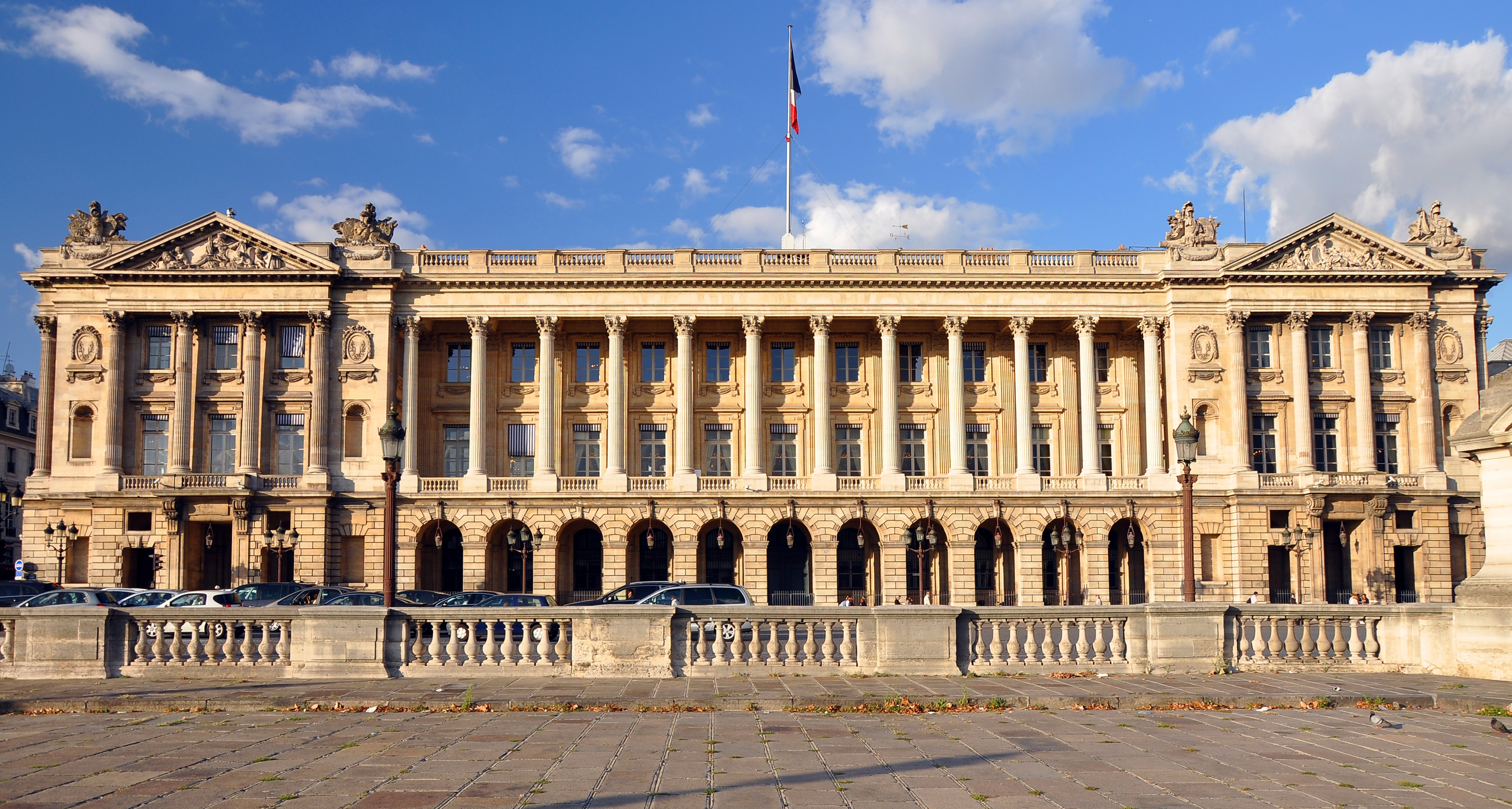
South front of the Hôtel de la Marine

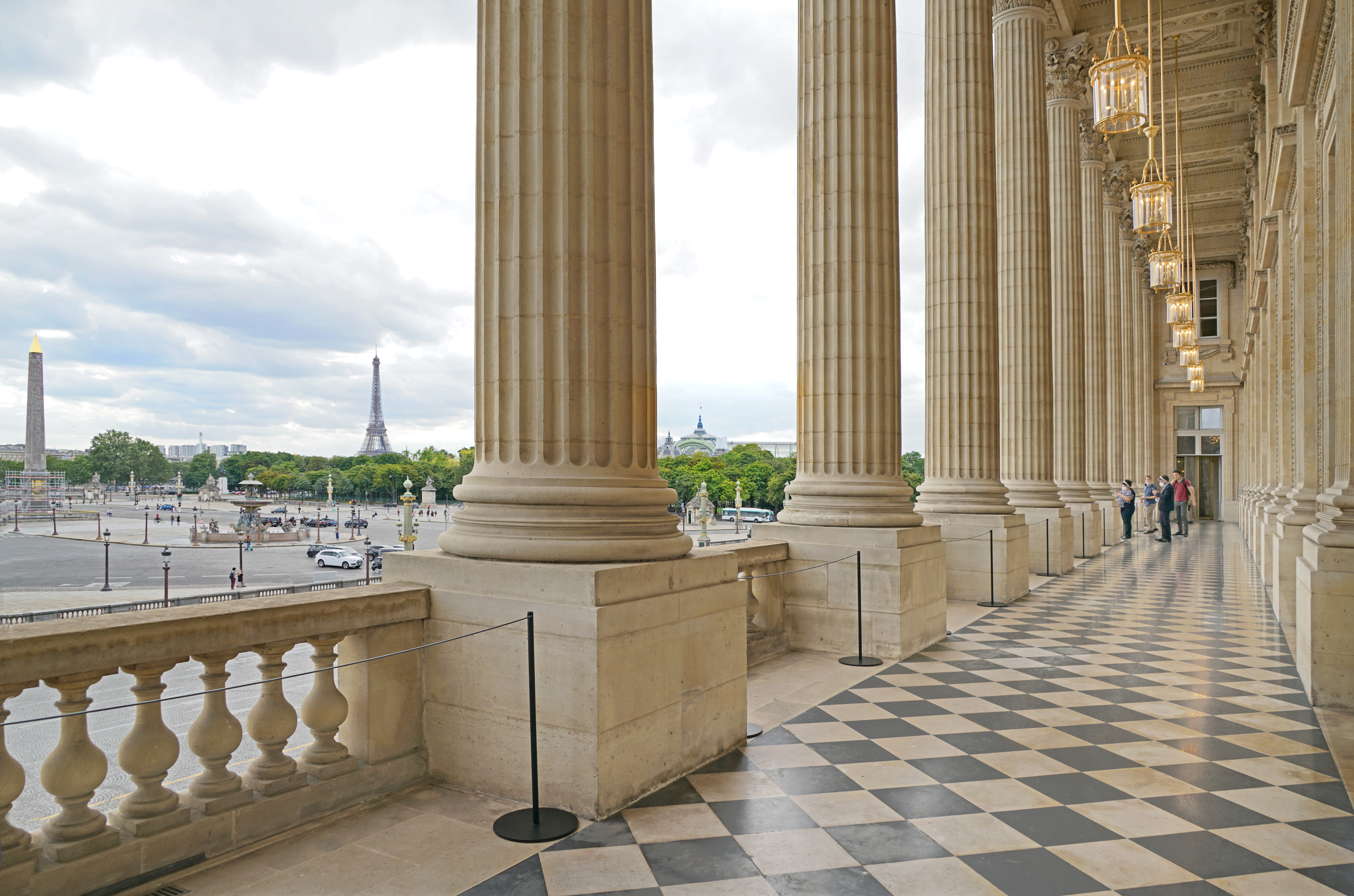
The Grand Loggia of the Hôtel de la Marine, overlooking the Place de la Concorde

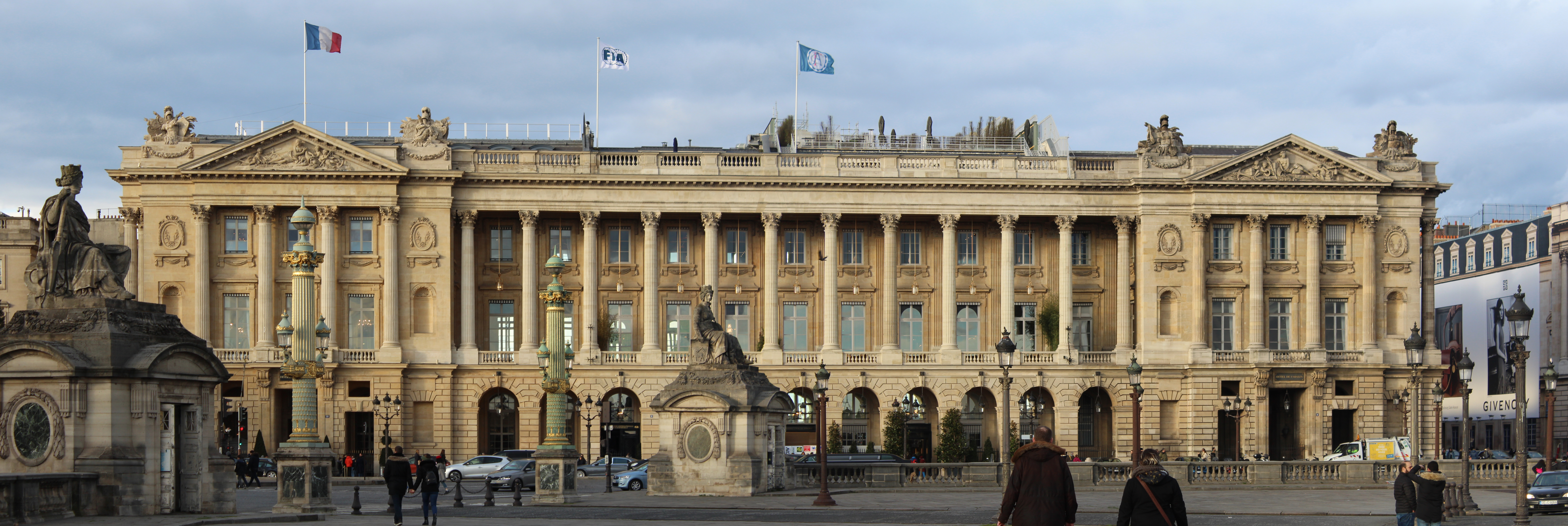
Hotel Crillon, FIA, and Automobile Club of France

The north side of the square, along the Rue de Rivoli, is occupied by two palatial buildings, whose matching façades were designed by Ange-Jacques Gabriel. They are separated by the Rue Royale, which enters the square from the north and was also designed by Gabriel. He planned the harmonious façades of the buildings along Rue Royale, including the façade and interior of his own residence at Number eight.

The Neoclassical facades of the two major buildings on the Place de la Concorde are nearly identical. Their design was inspired by the Louvre Colonnade, begun in 1667 by Louis Le Vau, architect of Louis XIV, Charles Le Brun, and Charles Perrault. The front is decorated with sculpted medallions and guerlands, another feature borrowed from the Louvre east front. The long front of colonnades is balanced at either end two sections with triangular frontons and Corinthian columns.

The building on the east, the Hôtel de la Marine, was originally the royal Garde-Meuble, the depot for all the royal furnishings. Marie Antoinette also had a small apartment there. In 1792, during the Revolution, it became the headquarters of the French Navy. The Navy departed in 2015, and the building is now a national monument and museum. The ceremonial rooms of the Navy and the apartments of the original intendants before the Revolution have been restored. Since 2021 the building is also home to the Al Thani Collection, a collection of ancient art from early civilisations brought together by Sheikh Hamad bin Khalifa Al Thani, first cousin of the Emir of Qatar.

The building on the west is divided into four separate buildings, which were originally occupied by members of the French Nobility.

- Number 4 was first occupied by the Marquise de Coislin, then, from 1805 to 1807, by the author and diplomat François-René de Chateaubriand (1805–1807).
- Number 6 was first occupied by the Rouillé de l'Estaing, secretary of the King, and later by the Marquise de Plessis-Bellière, who left it in her will to Pope Leo XIII. The Pope in turn sold it to the Automobile Club of France in 1901, and they still occupy it.
- Number 8, was occupied by the royal architect Pierre-Louis Moreau-Desproux. It was eventually also sold and now houses the Fédération Internationale de l'Automobile (FIA) which sanctions Formula 1 races.
- Number 10 was occupied by the 6th Duke of Aumont beginning in 1775. He ceded it in 1788 to the Duke of Crillon, who emigrated from France during the French Revolution. The Duchess of Crillon returned and she and her descendants occupied it from 1820 until 1904. In 1909 it became a hotel for wealthy travellers, the Hôtel de Crillon. In 2010 it was bought by a Saudi prince, Mutaib bin Abdullah Al Saud.

=== East side: The Tuileries Garden, Jeu de Paume and Orangerie ===
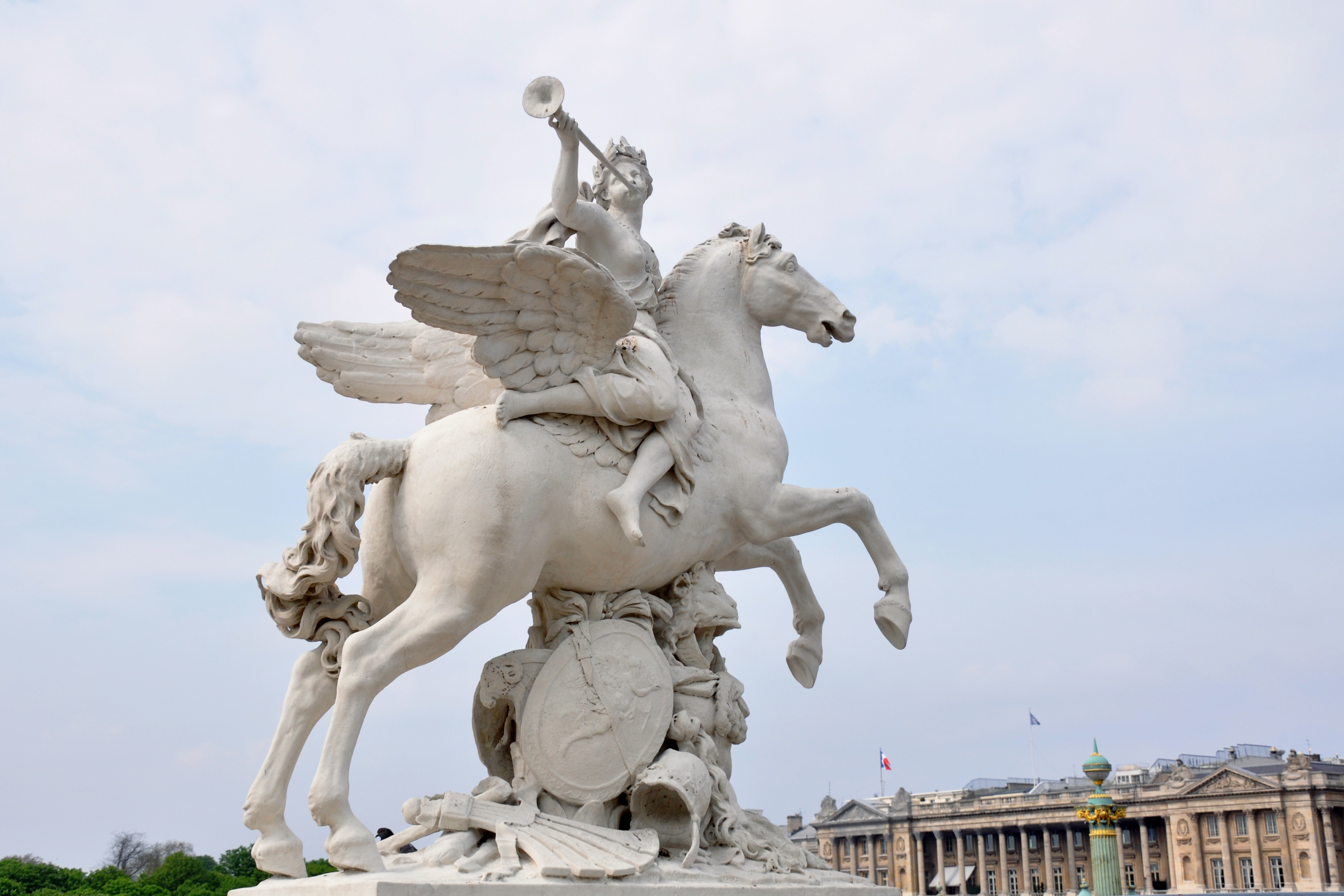
Copy of "Fame Riding Pegasus" by Antoine Coysevox at the entrance to the Tuileries Garden

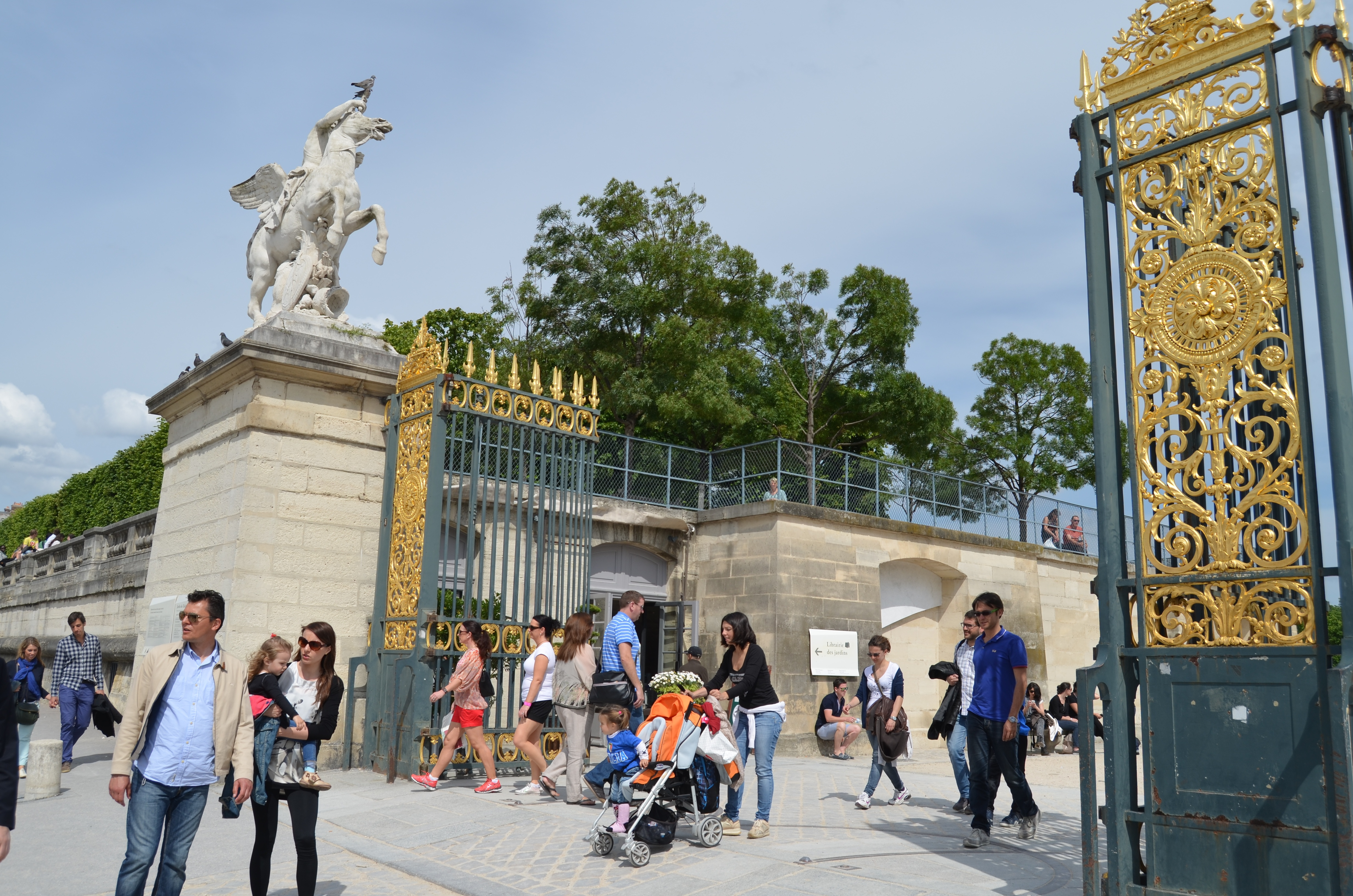
West gate from the square to the Tuileries Garden

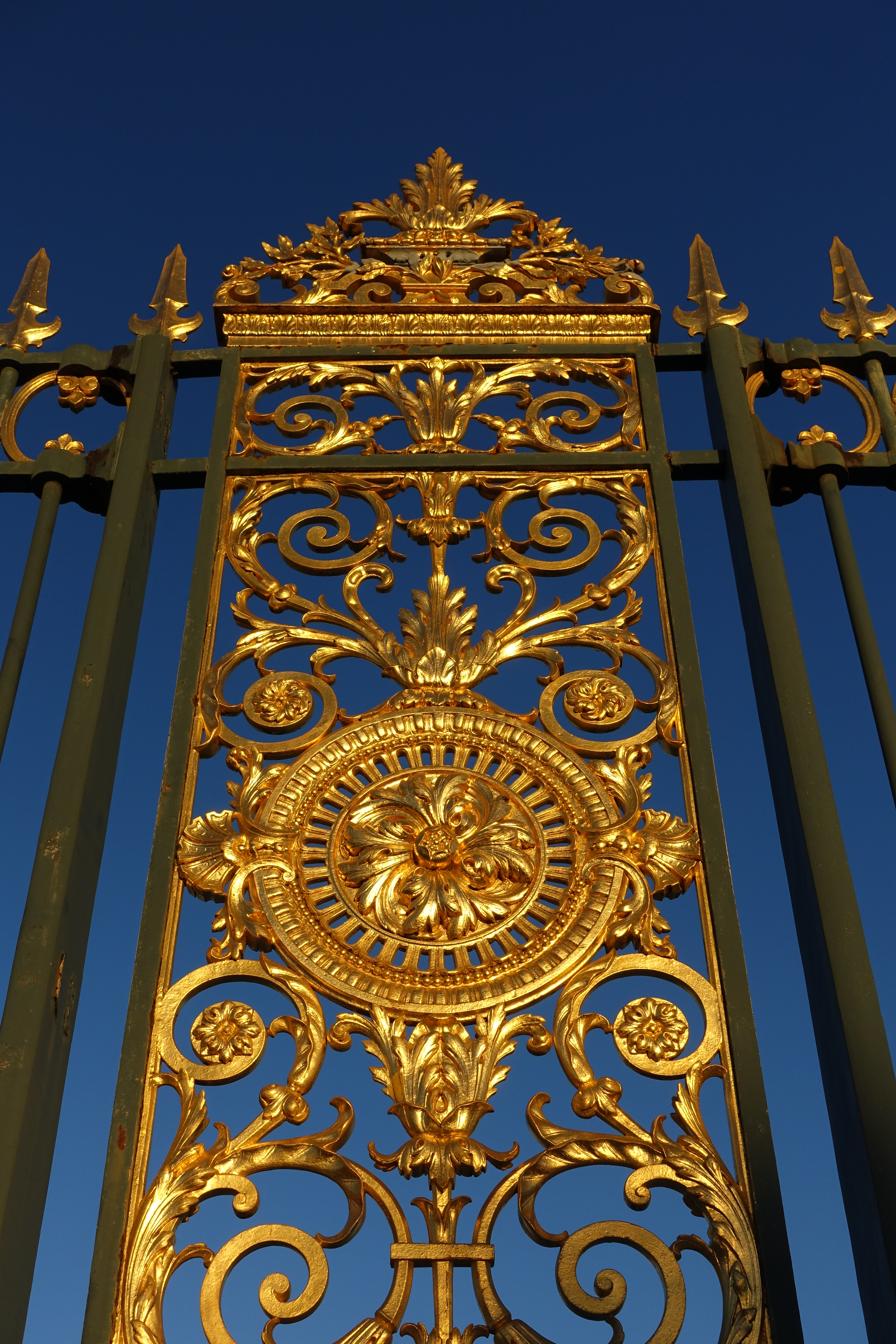
Detail of Gateway to the Tuileries Garden

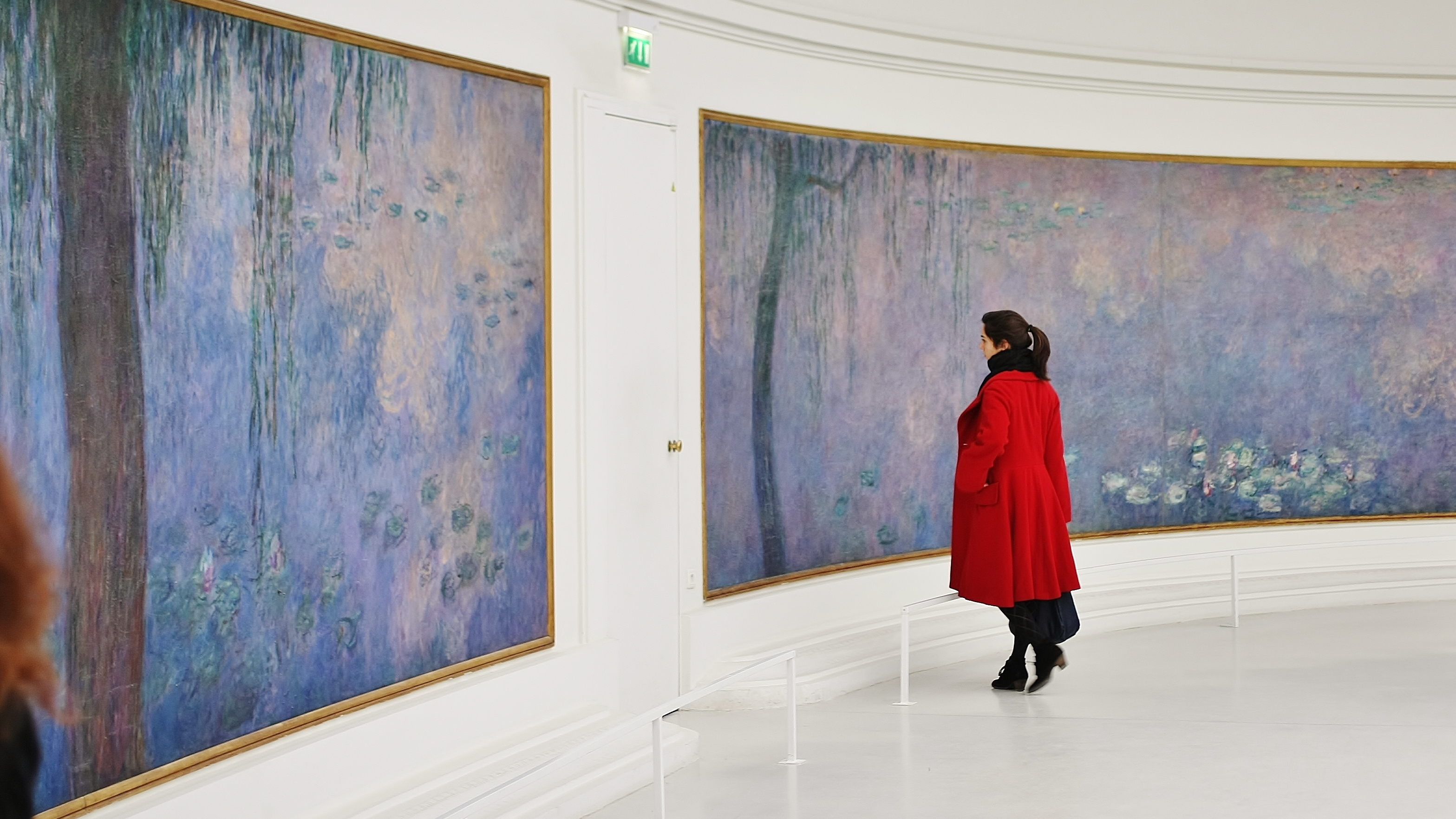
Two of the eight Water Lilies paintings by Claude Monet at the Musée de l'Orangerie, overlooking the square

On the east the Place de la Concorde is bordered by the two terraces of the Tuileries Garden, the park of the Tuileries Palace. The palace was burned by the Paris Commune in 1871, and few vestiges remain. The highly-ornate gilded gateway to the garden was designed by Ange-Jacques Gabriel, the architect to the square, and leads to the grand promenade of the garden which extends east as far as the Louvre. The gateway is flanked by two monumental equestrian sculptures by Antoine Coysevox, "Fame Riding Pegasus" and "Mercury Riding Pegasus", made for the Château de Marly of Louis XIV, and installed at the Tuileries in 1719. They are copies; the originals are now in the Louvre.

The early west gateway of Paris, the Port de la Conference, was located at the south end of the square, next to the Seine. It was built by Henry III of France, and as the city grew was demolished in 1730. A revolving bridge originally gave entry to the gardens; it was located where the ornamental is today.

The terraces of the Garden overlooking the square are the home of two museums. At the north end, near the Rue de Rivoli, is the National Gallery of the Jeu de Paume. It was built under Emperor Napoleon III as the imperial tennis court in 1861 and was enlarged in 1878. During the Second World War it was used by the Germans as a depot for storing looted art. From 1947 until 1986 it displayed the Impressionist paintings of the Louvre. In 1997, it was entirely rebuilt, and now displays temporary exhibitions of contemporary art.

Closer to the Seine is the Orangerie Museum, which was built in 1852 by architect Firmin Bourgeois as a winter shelter for the Tuileries citrus trees, also under Napoleon III. It was later converted into an art exhibition hall, and since 1927 it has been the home of one of the most famous groups of works of Impressionism, the eight paintings of the "Water Lilies" series by Claude Monet. It also displays the Walter Guillaume collection of impressionist and paintings and works from the school of Paris.

The terrace overlooking the square also displays a number of important works of sculpture. These include, since 1998, four works by Auguste Rodin: The Kiss (1881–1888); a bronze copy of the marble original, cast in 1934; "Eve" (1881); The Grand Shadow (1881); and Meditation, with arms (1881–1905). It also displays more modern works, including Le Belle Costumé (1973) by Jean Dubuffet, and Le Grand Commandement Blanc by Alain Kirili (1986). Two marble statues of lions are also displayed on the terrace, dating from the 18th century, and made by Giuseppe Franchi.

== Redesign of the square ==
First proposed by Anne Hidalgo in January 2021, the square is planned to be redesigned to increase pedestrian space, reduce car traffic, and add more green space and trees. Traffic will be directed around the outside edges of the square, with the number of traffic lanes greatly reduced. Four large areas of trees and greenery will be created in the corners of the square around the obelisk and monuments and open space in the centre – with 3.2 hectares (7.9 acres) of new green space. Work is scheduled to begin in 2026.

== See also ==
- Execution of Louis XVI
- List of works by James Pradier
- The 1920s redesign of Logan Circle (Philadelphia) was based on the Place de la Concorde and includes near-copies of the Hôtel de Crillon and Hôtel de la Marine and an allegorical fountain representing the rivers of the Philadelphia area.

== Bibliography (in French) ==
- Barozzi, Jacques (2010). Paris de Fontaine en Fontaine. Paris: Parigramme. ISBN 978-2-84096-658-6.
- Faul, Michel (2020). La place de la Concorde se souvient, mémoires d'un haut lieu de l'histoire de France. Paris: Editions Soteca. ISBN 978-2-376630-37-1.
- Fierro, Alfred (1996). Histoire et dictionnaire de Paris. Robert Laffont. ISBN 2-221-07862-4.
- Hillairet, Jacques (2017). Connaissance du Vieux Paris. Paris: Editions Payot and Rivage. ISBN 9-78222-8919-111-.
- Jacquin, Emmanuel (2000). Les Tuileries. Du Louvre à la Concorde (in French). Patrimoine. ISBN 978-2-85822-296-4.
- Pommereau, Claude (2021). Hôtel de la Marine (in French). Beaux-Arts Éditions. ISBN 979-10-204-0646-0.
- "Connaissance des arts" special edition, "L'Hôtel de la Marine", (in French), published September 2021
- Paris et ses fontaines, de la Renaissance à nos jours, texts assembled by Dominque Massounie, Pauline-Prevost-Marcilhacy and Daniel Rabreau, Délegation a l'action artistique de la Ville de Paris. from the Collection Paris et son Patrimoine, directed by Beatrice de Andia. Paris, 1995.
