= Charlotte Rosalie de Choiseul-Beaupré =

French courtier and mistress to Louis XV of France

Charlotte Rosalie de Choiseul-Beaupré née de Romanet (1733–1753) was a French courtier, mistress to Louis XV in 1752. She was the king's Petite maîtresse (unofficial mistress), not his Maîtresse-en-titre (official mistress).

She was the daughter of Pierre-Jean de Romanet (1685–1751) and Marie-Charlotte d'Estrades (1696–?). She married Count François-Martial de Choiseul-Beaupré (1717–1791) in 1751. She was the niece of Élisabeth-Charlotte d'Estrades, a confidant of Madame de Pompadour and lover of minister Marc-Pierre de Voyer de Paulmy d'Argenson. She was appointed lady-in-waiting to the king's daughters, the Mesdames.

She was launched by d'Estrades and d'Argenson as a candidate to replace Madame de Pompadour as the official mistress of the King, at a point when the sexual relationship between Pompadour and the king was discontinued and the king had started to acquire unofficial lovers to Parc-aux-Cerfs. She did have sex with the king in the summer of 1752 on Palace of Fontainebleau. Her husband's relative, Étienne François, duc de Choiseul, exposed the plot to Pompadour, who in turn had the king banish Charlotte Rosalie de Choiseul-Beaupré from court; she died in childbirth the following year. The incident attracted much attention at the time and she was the first woman treated seriously as a rival by Madame de Pompadour; the next and last would be Marie Anne de Coislin.
