= Marie Anne de Coislin =

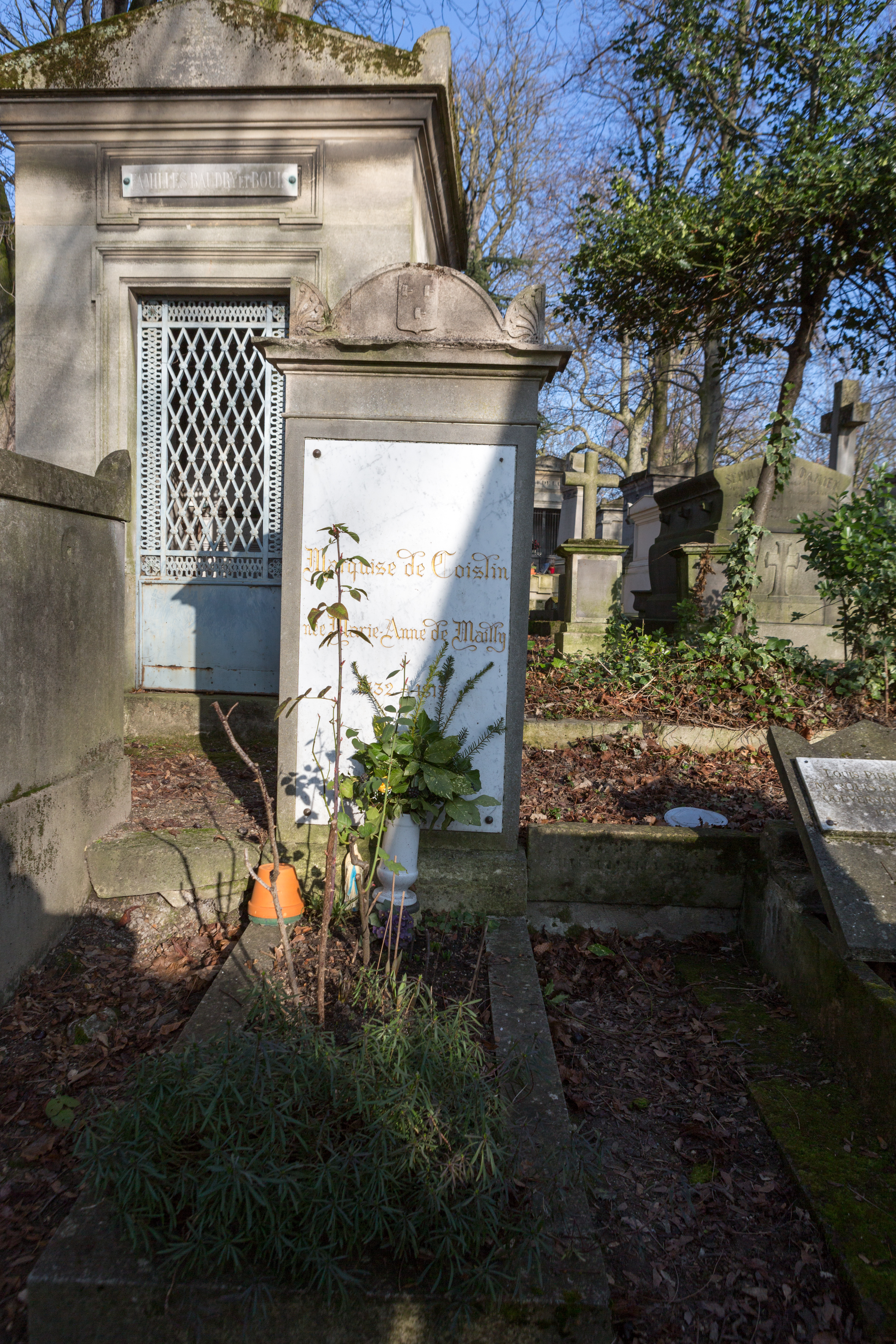

Marie Anne de Coislin (1732-1817), was a French aristocrat, known as the mistress to King Louis XV in 1755. She was the king's Petite maîtresse (unofficial mistress), not his Maîtresse-en-titre (official mistress).

She was the daughter of the marquis Louis de Mailly (1696-1767) and the lady-in-waiting Anne Françoise Elisabeth Arbaleste de Melun and married in 1750 to the duke Charles Georges René du Cambout de Coislin (d. 1771), but they separated early on and she moved back with her parents.

In 1755, Louis François, Prince of Conti launched her as his candidate to replace Madame de Pompadour as official mistress of the king. She was the first serious candidate to be put up against Madame de Pompadour since Charlotte Rosalie de Choiseul-Beaupré, and she was also to be the last. She did succeed to be the secret lover of the king, which attracted some attention at court. She became known as l'altière Vasthi. Ultimately, however, the plot failed, and she was ousted from court by Madame de Pompadour. After this, there was no more serious rival to replace Madame de Pompadour, and the king mainly settled with his unofficial lovers at the Parc-aux-Cerfs.

Marie Anne de Coislin had affairs with the Prince de Conti and the count de Coigny, and was claimed to have had affairs with Christian VI of Denmark-Norway, Gustav III of Sweden and Peter III of Russia. It is unknown if these rumours where true, but Christian VI and Gustav III did visit her during their visits to Paris, which attracted attention at the time.

She did not leave France during the French Revolution, but lived as a servant in Rouen, Brittany, and Vendée during the Reign of Terror. After the fall of Robespierre, she resumed her former life and property. She remarried in 1793 to Louis-Marie duc de Mailly (d. 1795).

== Sources ==
- Jules Moiroux, Le cimetière du Père Lachaise, Paris, S. Mercadier, 1908, p. 110
