= List of works by Helen Chadwick =

This is a list of artworks by the British artist Helen Chadwick (1953–1996) grouped by decade.

== 1970-79 ==
- Menstrual Toilet/ Menstrual Piece - 1975-76
- Domestic Sanitation - 1976
- In The Kitchen - 1977
- Train of Thought - 1978-79

== 1980-89 ==
- Model Institution - 1981-83
- The Juggler's Table - 1983
- Ego Geometria Sum - 1982–83
- The Oval Court - 1984-86
- One Flesh - 1985
- Allegory of Misrule - 1986
- Ruin - 1986
- Ecce - 1987
- Lofos Nymphon - 1987
- Three Houses: A Modern Moral Subject
- Viral Landscapes - 1989
- Philosopher's Fear of Flesh - 1989
- Enfleshing I & II - 1989
- Meat Abstract No.1-8 - 1989
- Black Hole - 1989
- Anatoli - 1989

== 1990-96 ==
- Nostalgie de la Boue - 1990
- Eroticism - 1990
- Loop My Loop - 1991
- Piss Flowers - 1991–92
- Wreath to Pleasure No.1-12 - 1992-93
- I Thee Wed - 1993
- Birth of Barbie - 1993
- Glossolalia - 1993
- Like a Virgin - 1994
- Billy Budd - 1994
- Adore; Abhor - 1994
- Cacao - 1994
- Philoxenia - 1994-95
- Et in Arcadia - 1995
- Cameo series - 1995-96
- Monstrance - 1996
- Nebula - 1996
