= The Boucher Nude =

Painting by John Brack

- Artist: John Brack
- Year: 1957
- Medium: oil on canvas
- Dimensions: 81.0 cm × 146.0 cm (31.9 in × 57.5 in)
- Location: Private collection, Melbourne

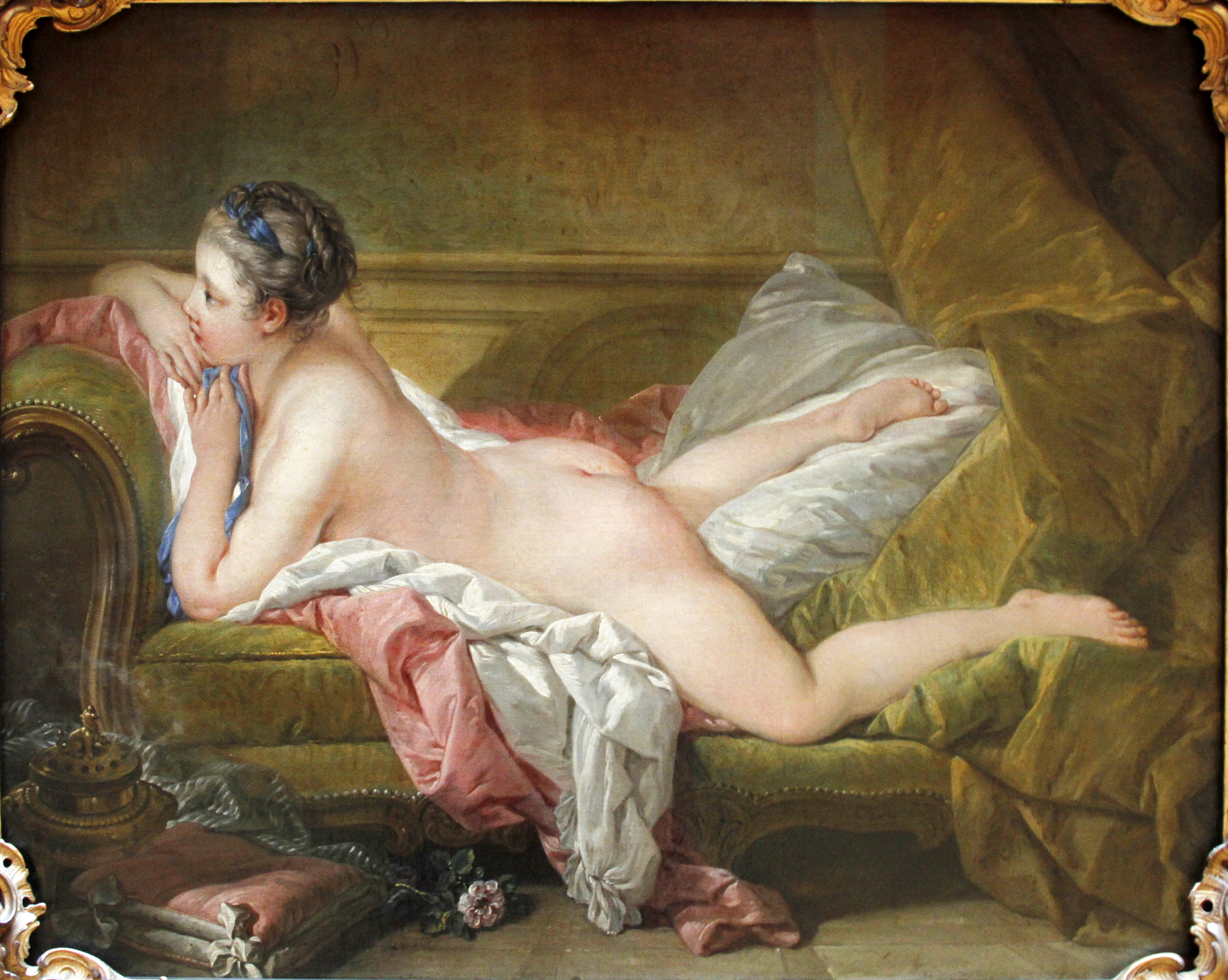
Blonde Odalisque (1752) by François Boucher

The Boucher Nude is a 1957 painting by Australian artist John Brack. The painting is a nude, depicting a woman lying on a sofa. Sasha Grishin, the William Dobell Professor of Art History at the Australian National University claimed that "The Boucher Nude can be justly regarded as one of the great masterpieces in Australian art."

The painting is one of a set of nine oil paintings—Brack's first paintings of the nude—first displayed in Melbourne in 1957. The series "subsequently become iconic in Australian art" with many ending up in public collections including Nude in an armchair (1957) purchased by the National Gallery of Victoria and Nude with two chairs (1957) acquired by the Art Gallery of New South Wales, both directly from this initial exhibition.

With what has been described as his "characteristic irony", Brack painted his thin dark-haired model—the only one to respond to his advertisement—in "the pose of the more voluptuous Mademoiselle O'Murphy, in François Boucher’s L’Odalisque (c.1745)""

[Brack] creates the most un–erotic nude in art history. Brack has radically reinterpreted Boucher’s artistic convention. It is not so much a question of a contrast between a skinny, awkward, black–haired woman with her small, slightly pinched features and Boucher’s plump and sensuous blonde, with her pretty, childish features and rounded proportions; it is more that Brack had engaged his whole repertoire of formal devices deliberately to destroy any trace of sensuousness.

— Sasha Grishin,

In 2008, the painting was sold for AUD1,500,000.
