= Aspex Gallery =

Art gallery

Coordinates: 50.7936°N 1.1061°W

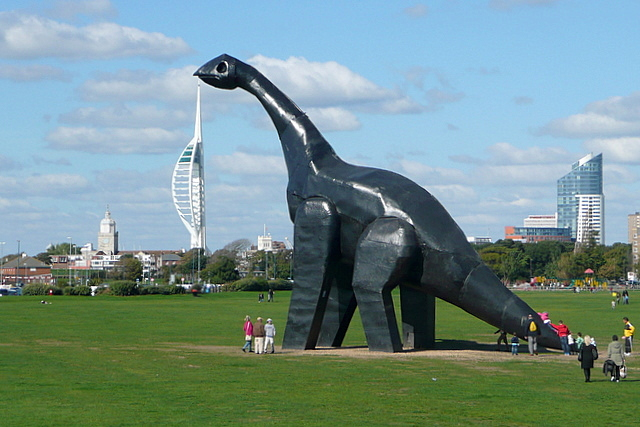
Luna Park by Heather Peak and Ivan Morison

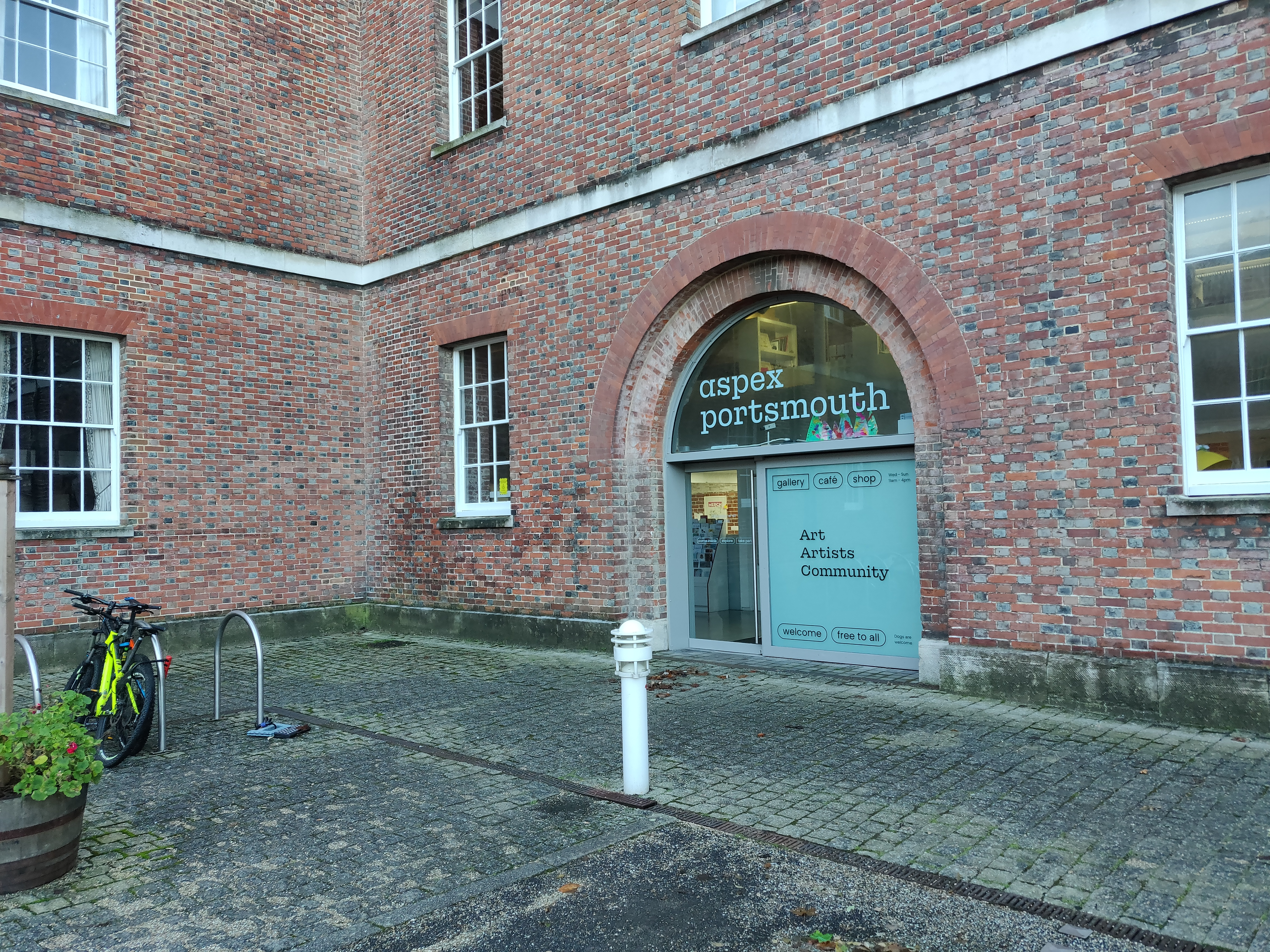
Aspex Gallery is based in the former Vulcan Block of HMS Vernon

Aspex Portsmouth (also known as "Aspex") is a contemporary visual art gallery located in the Gunwharf Quays area of Portsmouth.

Formed in 1981 as the exhibitions arm of Art Space Portsmouth in a converted chapel in Brougham Road, Southsea, the gallery became a separate legal entity in the early 1990s. It then moved to The Vulcan Building (a former Royal Navy storehouse) in Gunwharf Quays in 2006. The name 'Aspex' is derived from 'Art Space Exhibitions'. Art Space Portsmouth, who provide studio space to local artists, continue to be based at the Brougham Road site.

The gallery specialises in supporting artists at the early stages of their career. Notable artists that have exhibited at the gallery include Richard Wilson in 1983 and Helen Chadwick. The work exhibited by Chadwick, Ego Geometria Sum, is now part of the Tate collection.

In 2003 the gallery announced the first Emergency award, an open submission exhibition that would take place every two years, to be judged by a panel of artists, gallerists and curators. The first shortlist exhibition featured several artists who are now of some renown, including David Blandy, Juneau Projects and the eventual winner Susan Collis.

Aspex was instrumental in bringing Heather and Ivan Morison's 'Luna Park' to Portsmouth in August 2010, in conjunction with Chapter, Cardiff, firstsite, Colchester and Safle. Part of the installation was "Ultrasauros", a 53-foot recreation of the dinosaur of the same name on Southsea Common. The sculpture was destroyed by fire in 2010 during a storm.
