= The Brunette Odalisque =

Painting by François Boucher

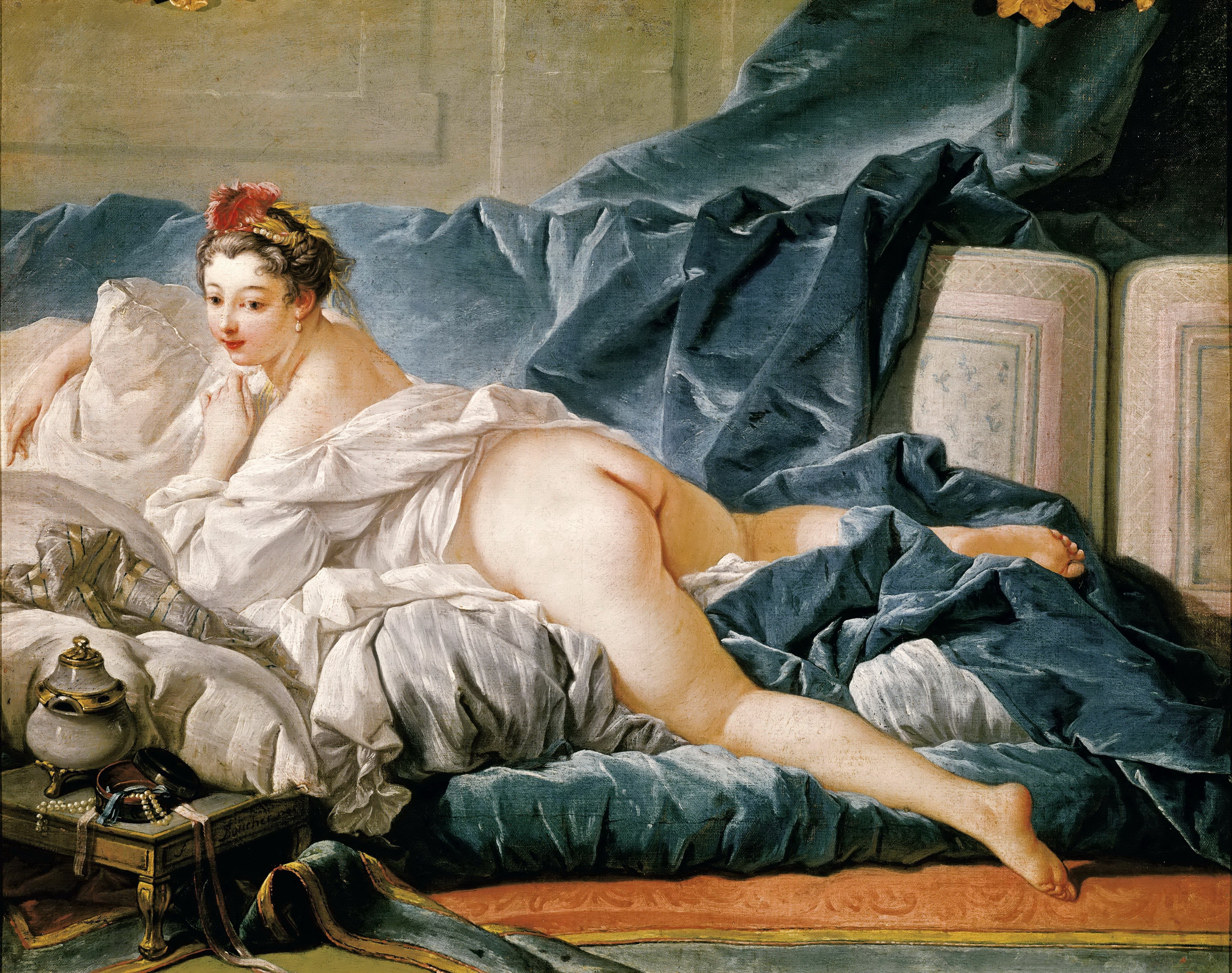
- Artist: François Boucher
- Year: c. 1745
- Medium: Oil on canvas
- Dimensions: 53 cm × 64 cm (21 in × 25 in)
- Location: Louvre, Paris

The Brunette Odalisque (French: L'Odalisque or l'Odalisque brune) is a 1745 oil-on-canvas painting by French artist François Boucher, now in the Louvre in Paris. The painter's signature is engraved on the low table. He later produced two other works in the odalisque genre, both known as The Blonde Odalisque.

== Description ==
The Brunette Odalisque depicts a partially nude woman in the foreground. Some speculate that it may be improper to call this woman an “odalisque” or a female concubine. However, many aspects of the painting suggest an exotic theme, such as the bed without a bed frame, the intricate pattern of vegetation on the screen, as well as the feathers in the woman’s hair. The woman in the painting is portrayed very intimately and specifically, as if the painting were a portrait of a particular person.

== Subject ==
The subject and format of the picture might suggest that it represents a mythological figure. In the time period, a reclining nude woman would generally be expected to represent a goddess, not a contemporary person. Jacob Vanloo's Coucher à l'italienne and Jacob Jordaens' Candaules and Gyges are two representative examples. The pose of the nude woman in Boucher's The Brunette Odalisque is a pose that Boucher often used to depict mythological figures in his own works like Leda and Venus Requesting Vulcan for Arms for Aeneas.

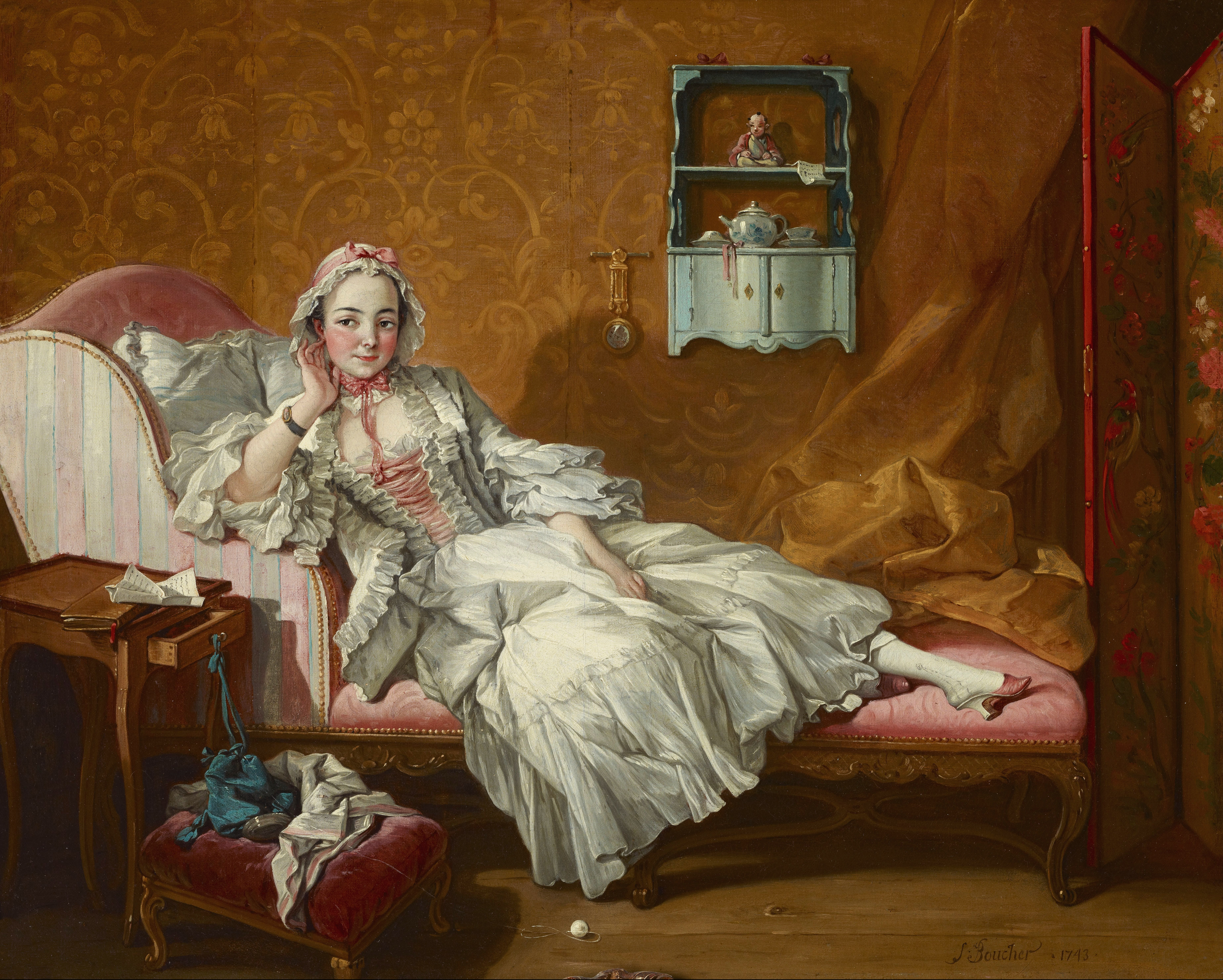
François Boucher, A Lady on Her Day Bed, 1743. Presumed Portrait of Madame Boucher. Frick Collection, New York.

However, art historians believe that The Brunette Odalisque may be a portrait of a real-life woman due to the specificity with which Boucher represented her features. There has been many guesses about her identity, including Madame de Pompadour, Victoire O’Murphy (alias Mlle de Saint-Gratien, the elder sister of the supposed subject of Boucher's The Blonde Odalisque). Above all, many art historians believe that the woman in the painting is Jean Cailleux, Boucher’s wife.

There are many reasons that support Boucher's wife as the central subject in the painting. For example, Boucher was not a portrait painter and did not paint portraits unless he had a special connection to the subject. In addition, François Boucher’s name is signed on a little note on the side table, once again, indicating a special link between the subject and the painter. Additionally, scholars have noted that the woman in The Brunette Odalisque resembles the presumed portrait of Boucher's wife in the Frick Collection. The possible identification of the subject as Boucher's wife generated controversy at the time. The art critic Denis Diderot chastised Boucher for "prostituting" his wife by displaying a nude painting of her, describing a work that resembles the Brunette Odalisque.

== Multiple versions ==
Boucher produced multiple signed versions of this painting. Alastair Laing notes that the vast distribution of the work calls into question the identification of the subject as Boucher's wife, since the artist would presumably not wanted to spread such an intimate subject so widely.

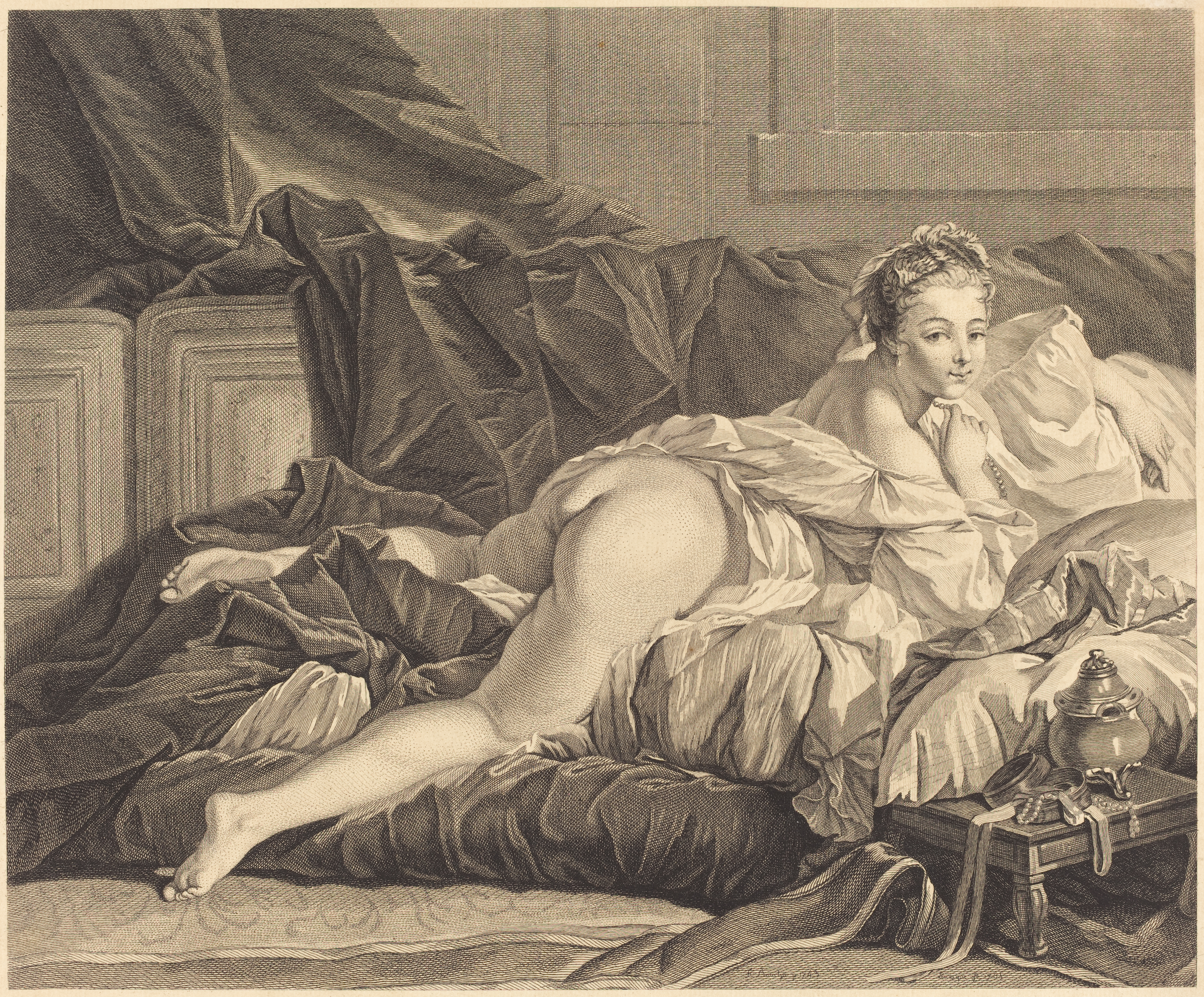
Pierre Charles Levesque after François Boucher, Le reveil, 1765, NGA 2873

An engraving made by Pierre Charles Lévesque in 1765 depicted the painting with a modified head, possibly to obscure the identity of the model, or perhaps to present a more fashionable or appropriate face for the later period. This print of a salacious work may have been created to discredit Boucher, coinciding with his appointment as Premier Peintre du Roi.
