= Louis Charles Antoine de Beaufranchet =

French general and politician

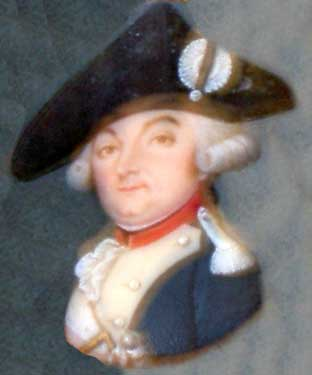
- Born: 22 November 1757; Ayat-sur-Sioule
- Died: 2 July 1812 (aged 54); Ayat-sur-Sioule
- Occupations: General; Politician

Louis Charles Antoine de Beaufranchet, Comte de Beaufranchet d'Ayat, Seigneur d'Ayat, de Beaumont, de Saint-Hilaire, etc. (French pronunciation: [lwi ʃaʁl ɑ̃twan də bofʁɑ̃ʃɛ]; 22 November 1757 – 2 July 1812) was a French general and politician under the French First Republic and French First Empire. He was the son of Marie-Louise O'Murphy and Jacques de Beaufranchet.
