= Viral Landscapes =

Artwork by Helen Chadwick

- Artist: Helen Chadwick
- Year: 1989
- Medium: Photograph
- Dimensions: 120 cm × 300 cm (47 in × 120 in)

Viral Landscapes is a series of artworks created in 1989 by the British artist Helen Chadwick. The series consists of five photographs, each three metres (9.8 ft) wide of different landscapes of the Pembrokeshire coast in Wales, overlaid with fragments of cellular imagery. Chadwick had taken samples of cells from her cervix, vagina, ear and mouth and overlaid the images of her body matter with patterns created by pouring paint onto the sea and dragging a canvas through the waves through computer imaging technology.

== Background and concept ==
After receiving negative criticism about the use of the naked female body in her previous work The Oval Court, Chadwick had decided to no longer represent her physical body in her art. The Viral Landscapes are attempts to display aspects of the body without the physical presence of a body. Chadwick wrote that "I felt compelled to use materials that were still bodily, that were still a kind of self-portrait, but did not rely on the representation of my own body."

Chadwick wrote that "we have become a viral condition in the landscape." The coastal landscapes can be seen as metaphors for the body as a site with boundaries and entrances that are at risk of viral infection and disease, and in particular the female body with the use of samples taken from her cervix. The series was made in response to the AIDS crisis in the 1980s. However, Chadwick was more interested in the relation between virus and host and how that can be seen as a metaphor for the relation between the individual and the world.
