= Luna Park (sculpture) =

Former public art sculpture

Coordinates: 50.784°N 1.096°W

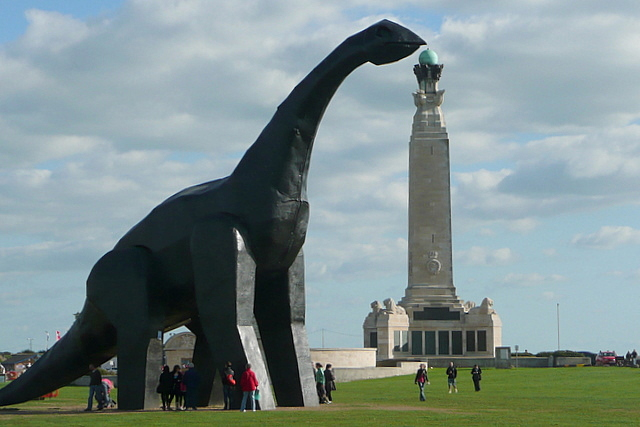
Luna Park

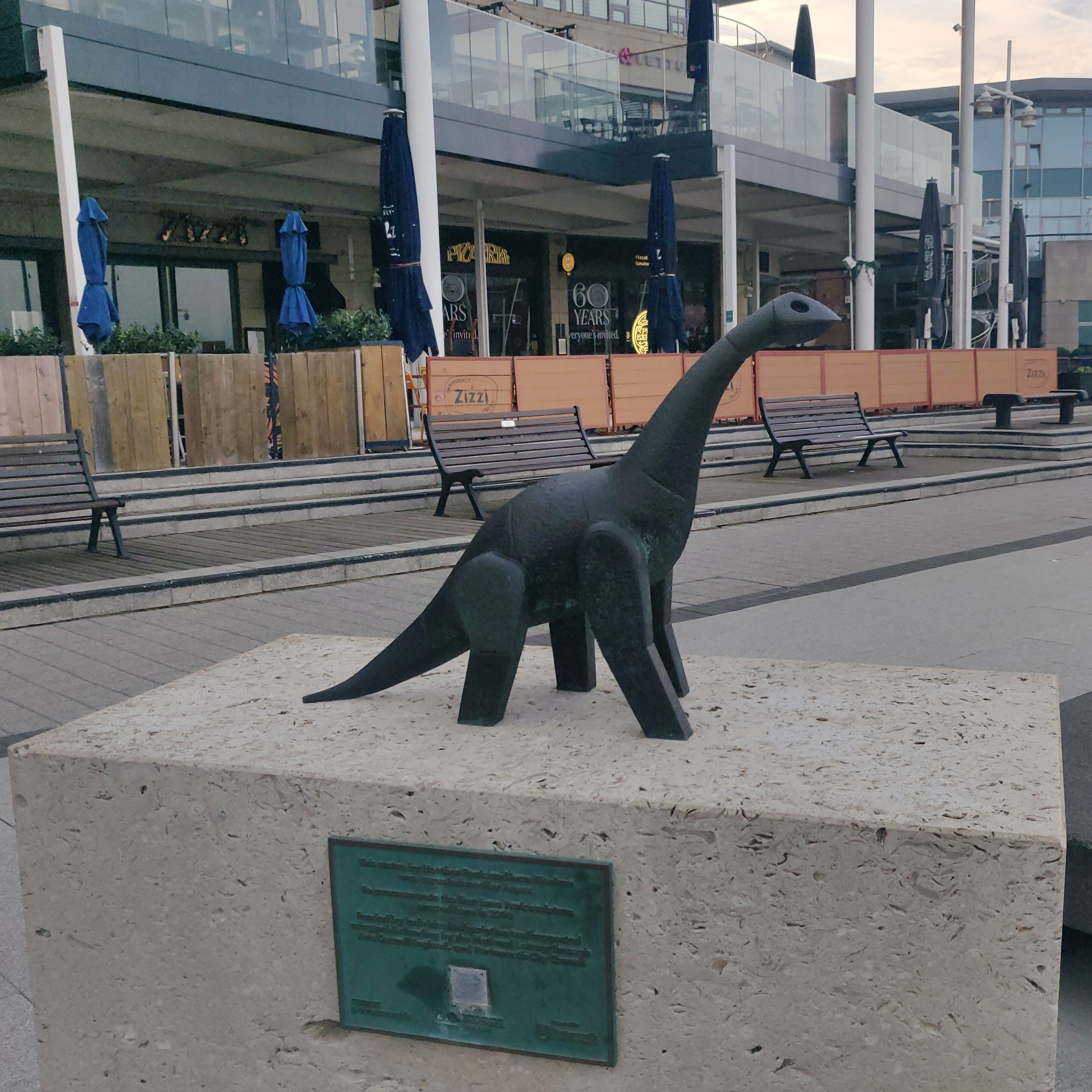
A tribute to the original Luna Park sculpture.

Luna Park (or The Southsea Dinosaur) was a 53 feet (16 m) sculpture of an Ultrasauros by Welsh artists Heather and Ivan Morison. The work was installed on Southsea Common in Portsmouth, England in 2010.

The sculpture was inspired by the work of palaeontologist James A. Jensen, who in the 1970s believed that a discovered set of giant bones belonged to the largest dinosaur that ever lived, which he dubbed "Ultrasauros". More than a decade later, however, it was revealed that his discovery was in fact a chimera, composed of bones from two different brachiosaur-type species.

The Luna Park sculpture took three years to plan and build. The sculpture was constructed by thirty factory workers in Serbia in a small village outside the city of Kragujevac. The construction team was composed of engineers, welders, assemblers and model makers were all ex-employees of the Zastava car factory (where Yugo cars were manufactured) that was Kragujevac's main employer, and Luna Park was made from the same materials used to model Yugos.

The sculpture was brought to the UK in August 2010 with the support of Portsmouth's Aspex Gallery. It attracted over 100,000 people during the exhibition, and the people of Portsmouth were so taken with the dinosaur that the leader of the local council, Gerald Vernon-Jackson hoped to make it a permanent fixture following a tour to the Firstsite gallery in Colchester and Chapter in Cardiff

However, at the end of September 2010, in the week before it was due to be moved, Luna Park caught alight and burned down overnight. Initial suspicions were that the fire was arson, but it was later determined to be due to an electrical fault.

In 2021 a miniature version of the original sculpture was installed on the seafront to serve as a permanent tribute to the original.
