= Piss Flowers =

Artwork by Helen Chadwick

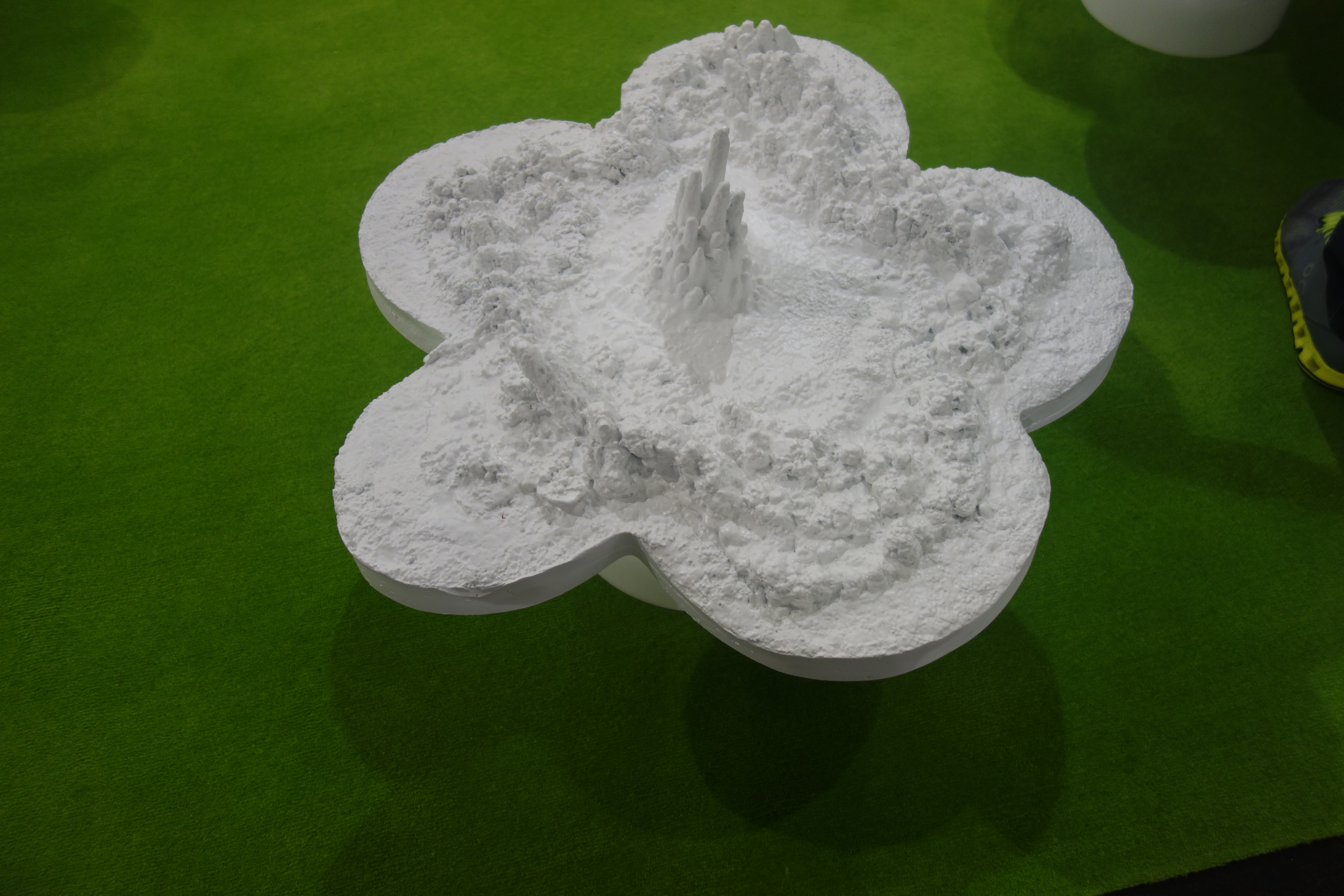
- Artist: Helen Chadwick
- Year: 1991-1992
- Medium: Enamelled Bronze

Piss Flowers is an artwork created by British artist, Helen Chadwick between 1991 and 1992. It is a group of twelve sculptures that Chadwick created during a residency at the Banff Centre for the arts in Alberta, Canada, in February 1991. It was part of Chadwick's solo exhibition 'Effluvia', displayed on top of green astroturf, at the Serpentine Gallery, London, in the summer of 1994.

== Background and concept ==
While staying in Canada, Chadwick and her partner, David Notarius, set off to different locations and made a mound of snow and placed a large flower shaped cutter over it. Chadwick and Notarius then took turns urinating in the snow. The cavities created by the urine were then filled with plaster and were shipped back to the UK where they were grafted on to hyacinth bulb-shaped pedestals and cast in bronze, enamelled white, and inverted. Initially, Chadwick had planned to take photographs of pitted snow, making light drawings of the alpine microcosm, but later realised that this would only be visible if it was cast and made into a sculpture.

Chadwick described the work as a "metaphysical conceit for the union of two people expressing themselves bodily". Upon initial inspection the central phallic form of Piss Flowers may appear to be created by a man; but it is actually caused by Chadwick, who was closer to the ground, squatting. Notarius, who was standing caused the more scattered impressions, forming a circle around Chadwick's in the snow. Piss Flowers explores this relation of the 'between' of sexual difference, the impressions left in the snow are not feminine or masculine but a combination of both.

Piss Flowers can be seen as echoing Marcel Duchamp's Fountain, part of his readymade series where he exhibited a urinal. The white colour of Chadwick's sculptures and its formations suggest the waste matter that would usually be flushed away. Piss Flowers can be seen as an example of indexical media - that appear not to be authored but instead preserve an imprint of reality. This kind of media was a particular interest of Chadwick's and can be seen with the use of the photocopier in her earlier work The Oval Court.

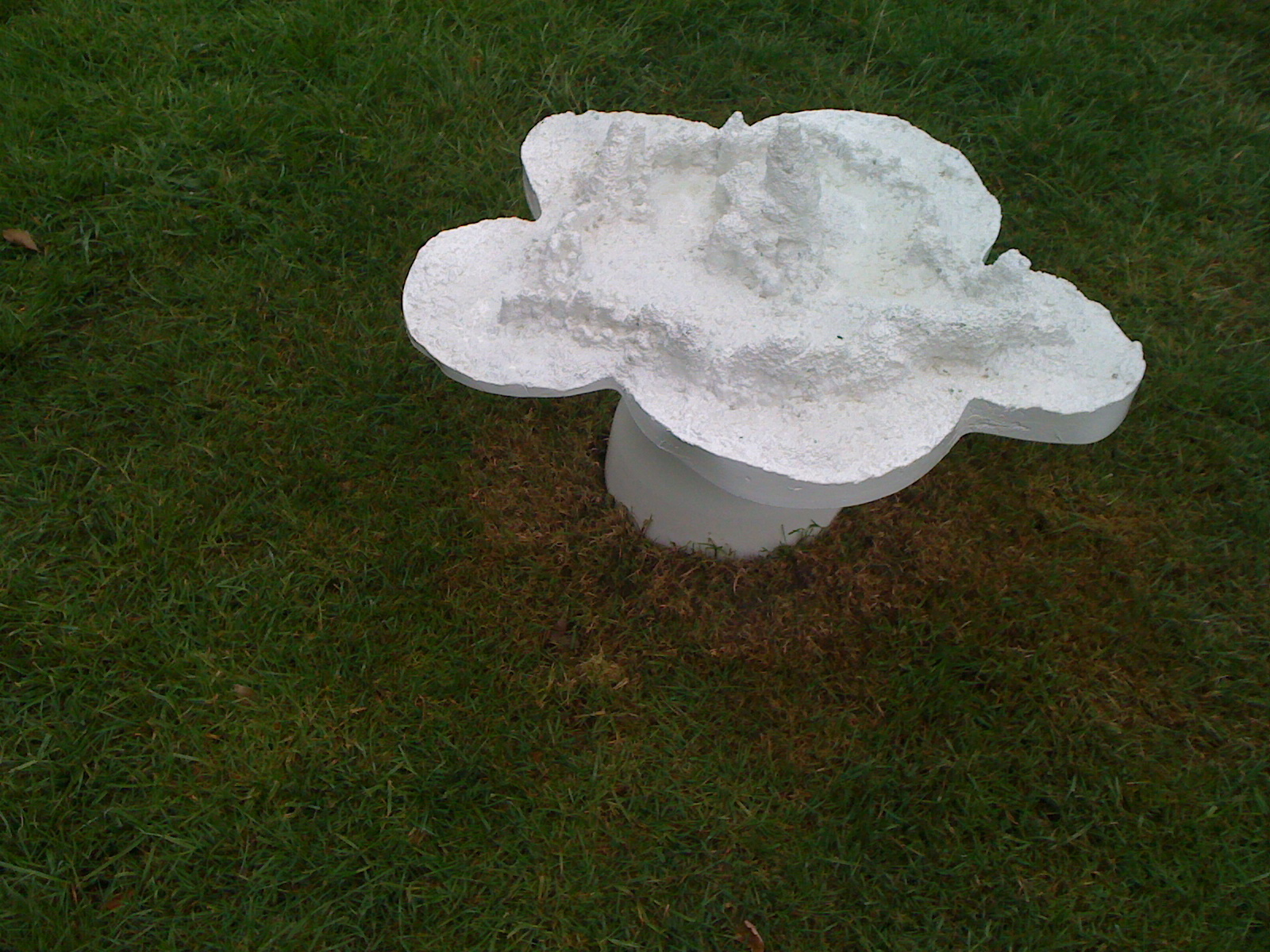
Piss Flowers

The work can also be seen to reference the shape of Andy Warhol's Daisy.

== Critical reception ==
Outside the art world, a local Nottingham councillor was quoted by the Nottingham Evening Post as saying "I doubt the minds of the people who can create things like this. It is astonishing that someone can go out and do something like this--it is an invitation to kids everywhere to go out and copy this".
