= Jacques Beaufranchet =

Jacques de Beaufranchet, Seigneur d'Ayat, was born 5 March 1728. His sister Amable married Gilbert Antoine des Aix, seigneur de Veygoux, and was mother to the famous General Desaix, who died at the Battle of Marengo in 1800. Beaufranchet was captain to the major's aide for the Beauvoisis regiment.

On 25 November 1755 he was married to Marie-Louise O'Murphy, "la belle Morphyse", who had been one of King Louis XV's mistresses. O'Murphy was born in Rouen, Normandy, to a family of Irish origin with known criminal pasts. Upon her unwise attempt to take the place of longtime favorite Madame de Pompadour as maitresse-en-titre, Louis XV sent O'Murphy away, gave her a false identity as "Marie-Louise Morphy de Boisfailly", daughter of an Irish gentleman, and had his agents quickly find her a suitable husband. Beaufranchet was selected for his aristocratic family, youth and handsomeness, respectable military career, and relative lack of money. Days after O'Murphy's expulsion from the King's service, they were hastily married in a very small and private ceremony, with neither Beaufranchet's parents nor any of O'Murphy's family in attendance. Louis XV provided O'Murphy with 200,000 livres in dowry and 1000 livres in marital fees, and separately gave Beaufranchet 50,000 livres for the marriage.

Beaufranchet was killed 5 November 1757 at the Battle of Rossbach. He was survived by his wife; their daughter, Louise; and their son, Louis Charles Antoine de Beaufranchet, who was born seventeen days after his father's death.
