= Ego Geometria Sum =

British 1980s plywood artwork

- Artist: Helen Chadwick
- Year: 1982-1983
- Medium: Plywood

Ego Geometria Sum is an artwork created by British artist, Helen Chadwick between 1982 and 1983. The work consisted of ten geometric plywood structures, in the shape of objects associated with Chadwick's past. Black and white naked photographs of the artist as well as locations associated with the objects were printed on the surface of the objects. The objects represent the mass of the artist's body at a progression of ages, from premature birth to maturity at age 30. These objects include a 'Incubator - birth', 'Font - 3 months', 'Pram - 10 months', 'Boat - 2 years', 'Wigwam - 5 years', 'Bed - 6 3/4 years', 'Piano - 9 years', 'Horse - 11 years', 'High School - 13 years' and 'Statue - 15–30 years'. Chadwick chose to not show her face in any of the images on the structures to allow a universality to the work even though it is heavily autobiographical, Chadwick wanted to find universal laws within the chaos of an individual life.

The structures were placed directly on the gallery floor and were organised in a spiral formation. Surrounding the objects was an enclosed space on three sides by flesh coloured curtains, which suggests a theatrical staging of the past in geometric form. It was first displayed in June 1983 at the Serpentine Gallery's group exhibition, 'Summer Show I' and was originally entitled 'Growing Pains'. The Latin title Ego Geomtria Sum - I am Geometry - had already been conceived by Chadwick before its first exhibition, but was not used formally until it was exhibited at the Art and Research Exchange (A.R.E) in Belfast during November 1983. Shortly after the work was first exhibited, Chadwick in collaboration with photographer, Mark Pilkington, created a series of ten photographs called Ego Geometria Sum: The Labours. In each photograph Chadwick is shown naked either holding or somehow interacting with each structure of Ego Geometria Sum, alluding to the labours of Hercules. In later installations of the work these photographs were displayed between curtains on the gallery wall.

== Background and concept ==
Chadwick decided to give her full attention to the idea of an autobiographical project early in 1982. This was in response to what she wrote in her notebooks as a "need for the indulgence of going back to rescue "I" from severity and cruelty adopted as a means of surviving now." She claimed to feel alienated from her practice due to her earlier collaborative projects. She resolved to counter this by "welcoming the warm yet lost flow of memory."

Chadwick read Arthur Koestler's book The Sleepwalkers: A History of Man's Changing Vision of the Universe during her research for this project. The earlier title, 'Growing Pains' was derived from the title of the third chapter in Part Four: The Watershed which tracks the discoveries of astronomer, Johannes Kepler. In both titles of the work, Chadwick was alluding to Kepler's theory of the universe as a cosmic design that is made by God and governed by the principles of geometry.The geometric structures and spiral formation of Ego Geometria Sum were inspired by this worldview. Ten structures were used because the number ten is considered sacred in Pythagorean theory of numerical harmony. Chadwick wrote "if geometry is an expression of eternal and exact truths... then let this model of mathematical harmony be infused with a poetry of feeling and memory to sublimate the discord of past passion and desire in a recomposed neutrality of being.”

== Critical reception ==
With this work Chadwick wanted to free the ego from the traumas of the past. This idea was continued in Chadwick's later work, The Oval Court where the ego is dissolved.

Ego Geometria Sum received positive critical responses and was exhibited widely between 1983 and 1985. The work's success marked a turning point for Chadwick as an artist and she became firmly established in the contemporary British art world.
