= The Oval Court =

British 1980s artwork

- Artist: Helen Chadwick
- Year: 1984-1986
- Medium: Photocopy collage
- Dimensions: 122 cm × 198 cm (48 in × 78 in)
- Location: Victoria and Albert Museum, London
- Accession: E.1:2-1988

The Oval Court is an artwork created between 1984 and 1986 by British artist Helen Chadwick. The work was part of Chadwick's first major solo exhibition entitled Of Mutability, held at the Institute of Contemporary Arts in London. Chadwick received a Turner Prize nomination in 1987 for the exhibition, making her one of the first women to be nominated for the prize. The work is currently in the collection of the Victoria and Albert Museum in South Kensington, London.

The Oval Court refers to an entire room in the Of Mutability exhibition. On the walls of the room were a Venetian glass mirror and photocopied images of the artist crying with tears made of blue foliage which flowed down into computer rendered drawings of the Baroque columns from the baldacchino of St Peter's Basilica, that reach down to the floor. As if formed from the artist's tears, the centre of the room contained an ovoid shaped, photocopied collage of blue toned A4 paper where multiple copies of the artist appear floating in a pool of plenty, with dead animals, insects, flowers, fruit and fish all swimming around her. In the centre of this platform are five golden spheres corresponding to the artist's fingers as well as the touch of the divine. In the second room of the exhibition was Carcass (1986) a glass tower two metres high, full of rotting vegetable matter which the artist would refill daily. Carcass was adjacent to the room containing The Oval Court, the decay of Carcass seemed to loom over The Oval Court that was full of reminders of the transience of life.

== Background and concept ==
The Oval Court was made with a Canon photocopier and a computer. Chadwick claimed to like the photocopier and said it is "an extraordinarily direct and efficient medium." She liked that there was no conscious framing of the image.

The work plays into the vanitas tradition with its subtle display of the transience of life, such as Chadwick's use of dead animals, maggots and fruits. In a traditional vanitas work the human body is often absent from the scene and if it is present, the person is usually solemnly contemplating death. Chadwick subverts this by having her naked body embrace and enjoy the transient and the goods surrounding her. In her notes Chadwick describes the 12 nude images of her as "12 gates to paradise, the twelve paths to self-knowledge through the power of love" and here she achieves "one-ness with all living things." Chadwick claimed to have been heavily influenced by the Rococo and Baroque eras for the creation of this work. She visited many churches and palaces of these eras before creating the work. She turned the heavenly ceiling paintings of the Rococo and Baroque upside down so instead of looking up at a glimpse of heaven we are looking down at her floating world of desire. Chadwick described the work as "a stitching together of so many different references, ultimately post-modern, a kind of bowerbird theft of facets from everywhere, from architecture, from painting." Chadwick's body and facial expressions in The Oval Court, references specific paintings and sculpture of the Rococo and Baroque. Such as Gian Lorenzo Bernini's sculpture the Ecstasy of Saint Teresa. As well as Jean-Honore Fragonard's The Raised Chemise and Francois Boucher's The Brunette Odalisque and The Blond Odalisque.

== Critical reception ==
The Oval Court and her earlier work Ego Geometria Sum, received a lot of criticism from Feminist reviewers arguing whether the way the artist's naked body is perpetuating the objectification of the female body. Chadwick claimed that she wanted to address "the issue of the female body as the site of desire" and "was looking for a vocabulary for desire where I was the subject and the object and the author." Chadwick tried to achieve this by having all the figures in the work never look out at the viewer, they do not invite the viewer in, they are all engaged in their own forms of pleasure.

As a response to this criticism Chadwick began to question the use of the body in her art and she stated that "I made a conscious decision in 1988 not to represent my body. It immediately declares female gender and I wanted to be more deft." After this Chadwick's work, while still exploring notions of the self, never portrayed her outside body again. Instead she turned her focus inwards with her Meat Lamps series.
