= Marie-Louise O'Murphy =

Mistress of King Louis XV of France

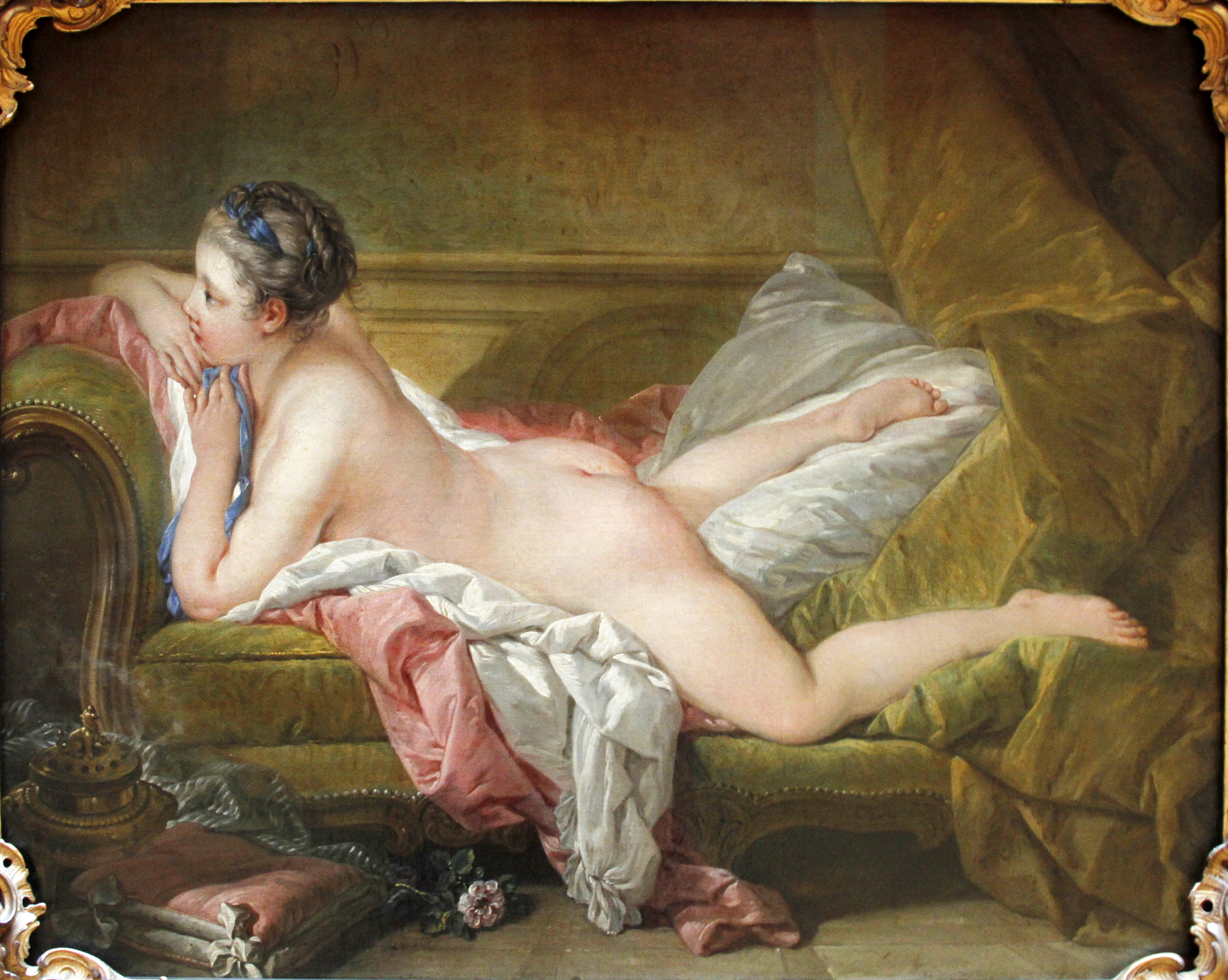
- François Boucher's The Blonde Odalisque c. 1752, oil on canvas, Alte Pinakothek, Munich
- Born: 21 October 1737; Rouen, France
- Died: 11 December 1814 (aged 77); Paris, France
- Other names: Mademoiselle de Morphy; La Belle Morphise; Louise Morfi; Marie-Louise Morphy de Boisfailly
- Occupation: Nude model (1751-1752)
- Years active: 1751-1755

Marie-Louise O'Murphy (French pronunciation: [ma.ʁi.lwiz ɔ‿.myʁ.fi]; 21 October 1737 – 11 December 1814) was a French model who was the youngest lesser mistress (petites maîtresses) of King Louis XV, and the model for François Boucher's painting The Blonde Odalisque, also known as The Resting Girl. She was also variously called Mademoiselle de Morphy, La Belle Morphise, Louise Morfi and Marie-Louise Morphy de Boisfailly.

== Birth ==
Marie-Louise O'Murphy (or Morfi) (Note: Morfi was the common spelling used by her father when signing various documents, like his marriage record on 21 January 1714 in Rouen or the act of baptism of his daughter Marie-Louise in 1737.) was born in Rouen on 21 October 1737 as the youngest of twelve children of Daniel Morfi and Marguerite Iquy. (Note: In the parish registers of Saint Eloi and Saint Sauveur de Rouen could be identified 12 children of Daniel O'Murphy and Marguerite O'Hiquy.) She was baptized the same day in the church of Saint Eloi:

The 21st of October of 1737 was baptized by our priest Marie-Louise, daughter of Daniel Morphy and Marguerite Iquy and born from a legitimate marriage. The godfather Louis Jean Baptiste Goudouin and the godmother Marie Anne Obrienne signed the document. [Signed: Morfi, Louis Jean Baptiste Gondoüin, Marie Obrienne, Aubin priest.]

== Irish ancestry ==
The family of Marie-Louise O'Murphy was of Irish origin, who settled in Normandy. The presence of her paternal grandfather Daniel Murphy is attested in Pont-Audemer at the end of the 17th century, when his first wife Marguerite Connard (also Irish) died. Militant of the Jacobite army, he followed the deposed King James II of England to his exile in the Château de Saint-Germain-en-Laye; in consequence all the Catholic regiments who remained loyal to the King were sentenced to death in absentia by the new English government.

Very little is known about the grandfather of Marie-Louise O'Murphy, except that he was one of the soldiers fired after the Treaty of Ryswick in 1697. Daniel Murphy (variously named Morfil, Morfi or Morphy), moved to Rouen by 1699, when he married his second wife Brigitte Quoin; according to the parish records of Saint Eloi, in his marriage certificate he is designated as master shoemaker (maître cordonnier).

His son, Daniel Morfi, father of Marie-Louise O'Murphy, married Marguerite Iquy, also Irish, on 21 January 1714 in the parish of Saint Eloi in Rouen:

The 21 of January of 1714 were married by the priest Daniel Morphy parishioner of Saint Maclou son of Daniel and Marguerite Connard, and Marguerite Iquy daughter of Jean and Brigitte Chrestien... [Signed: daniel morfi, marguerite iqui, Catt Blake, Pierre D'Heguerty, h Breheoy, etc.]

Of the twelve children born to the couple between 1714 and 1737, five died shortly after birth and seven survived to adulthood: five daughters (Marguerite-Louise, Marie-Brigitte, Marie-Madeleine, Marie-Victoire, Marie-Louise); and two sons (Jean-François and Michel-Augustin).

== Family ==
Marie-Louise's parents had well-known criminal histories: Daniel Morfi was involved in a case of espionage and blackmail, while Marguerite Iquy was accused of prostitution and theft. Daniel Morfi appears in the records of the Bastille, where he was confined "for state business" after his arrest on 23 February 1735. An unscrupulous collaborator, then identified as secretary of Charles O'Brien, 6th Viscount Clare accused him of stealing diplomatic correspondence that his master kept in secret with James Francis Edward Stuart (known as "The Old Pretender"), the pretender to the English throne, then exiled in Rome. Daniel Morfi had tried to blackmail James Francis, by threatening to sell to the court of London the papers he had stolen. The case undermines the French Government, by revealing secret diplomatic negotiations in favor of the restoration of the Stuarts. The arrest record showed that Daniel Morfi possessed a handwritten letter of the Cardinal de Fleury, a letter from Viscount Clare and a letter from James Francis Stuart himself, containing his plans for the Restoration. Daniel Morfi was held incommunicado for seven months at the Bastille; after this, he was able to join his wife and children, but all were locked under close supervision into the Abbey of Arcis near Nogent-le-Rotrou. This confinement was terminated on 21 December 1736: Daniel Morfi was allowed to go wherever he wished, except Paris. Thus, with his family, he returned to Rouen, where Marie-Louise was born a year later.

Margaret Iquy, wife of Daniel Morfi, also left her traces in legal history. Arrested on 10 May 1729, along with Anne Galtier, she was conducted to the prison of For-l'Évêque, and later imprisoned in the Salpêtrière. Nicknamed "The Englishwoman" (l’Anglaise), she was 29 years old and recorded as originating in Saint-Germain-en-Laye; the inspector who arrested her declares that "these two prostitutes lived in debauchery with a young man of family" and "it was by the solicitation of these two women that this young man had done to his aunt a considerable theft".

The sisters of Marie-Louise O'Murphy are also known for being involved in prostitution. Jean Meunier, police inspector who was in charge of monitoring girls and women involved in this work, dedicated several pages to the O'Murphy sisters in the diary that he wrote from 1747 and in a report made in 1753 for his superior Nicolas René Berryer, lieutenant général de police. On 12 May 1753 Meunier dedicated three pages to the five O'Murphy sisters: Marguerite, Brigitte, Madeleine, Victoire and Marie-Louise. About Marguerite and Madeleine (nicknamed Magdelon), he notes that they have their "campaigns in Flanders" following the French army, but before their departure would often be in the company of their sister Victorie and "the Richardot, the Duval, the Beaudouin, the Fleurance and other women of the world". About Brigitte, Meunier wrote that "she always stayed with her parents and she wasn't either brilliant or noisy"; however, he concluded that "despite her ugliness we are sure that she wasn't an innocent girl".

This is probably a similar account to the information written by Marquis d'Argenson in his diary on 1 April 1753 about Marie-Louise O'Murphy:

The King had a new mistress ... she belonged to a family of prostitutes and thieves.

After the death of her father on 4 June 1753, Marie-Louise's mother brought the family to Paris.

== Model of François Boucher ==
In contemporary and modern historiography it is believed Marie-Louise O'Murphy was the very young model who posed for the Jeune Fille allongée (Reclining Girl), of François Boucher, a painting famous for its undisguised eroticism, dating from 1752. Two versions of this painting have survived, both conserved in Germany, one in the Alte Pinakothek at Munich and the other in the Wallraf-Richartz Museum at Cologne. Boucher, at the height of his fame, had made a specialty of these deliberately licentious nudes, represented in lascivious poses within a mythological context. La Jeune Fille allongée, also known as l'Odalisque blonde (the Blonde Odalisque), echoes the also erotic Odalisque brune (Brown Odalisque), painted around 1745, several copies of which are kept at the Louvre or the Museum of Fine Arts, Rheims.

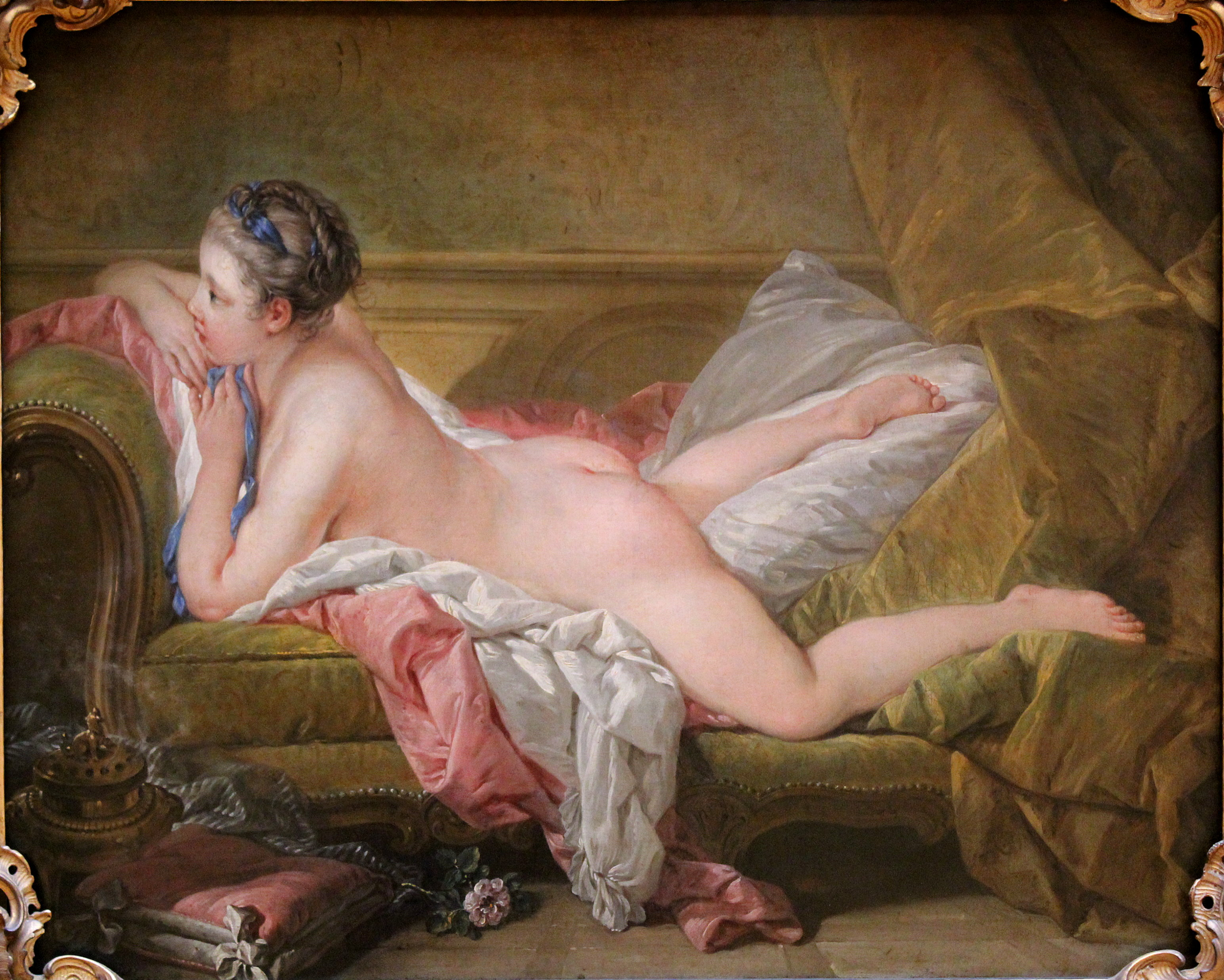
Painting from the Alte Pinakothek, Munich.

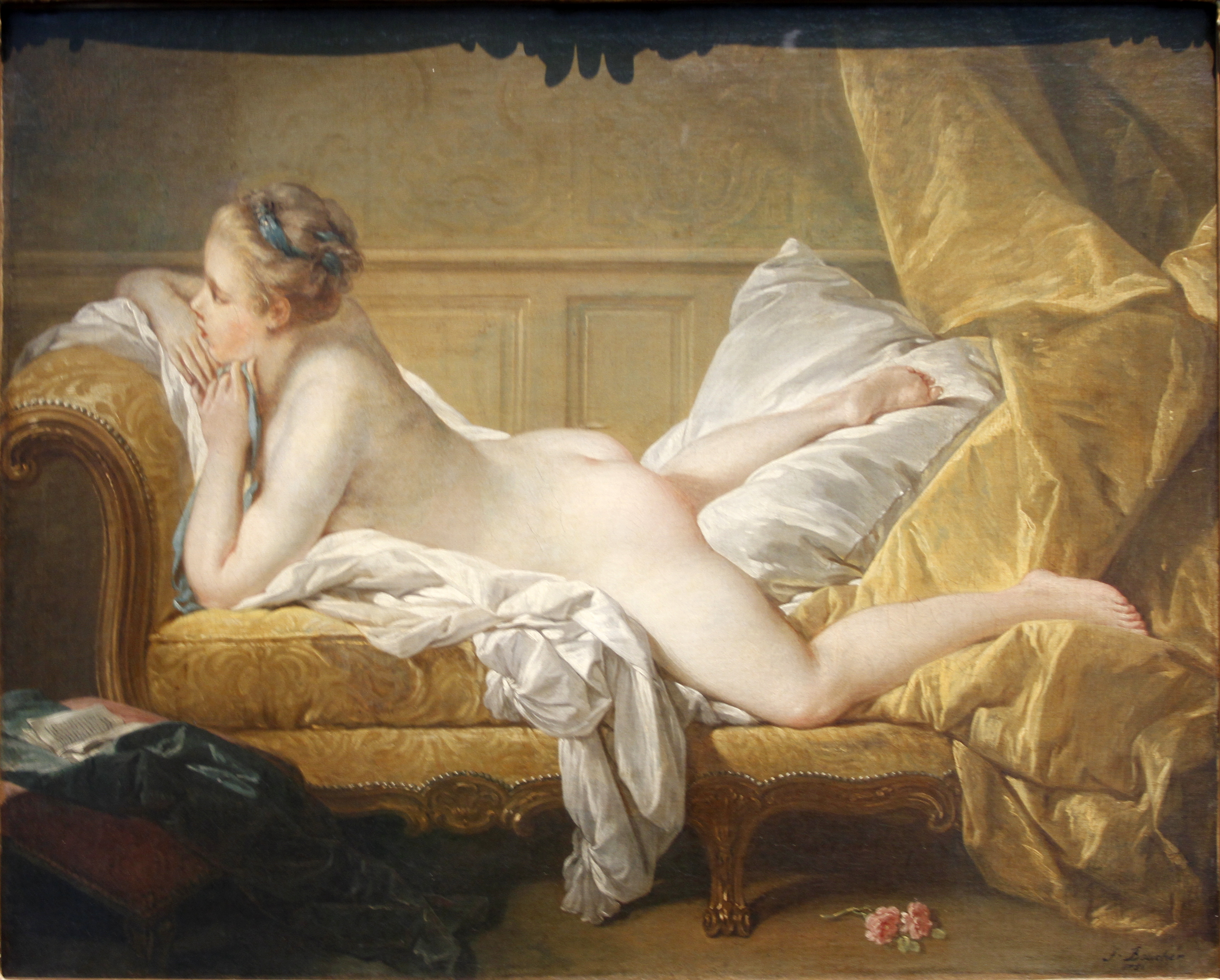
Painting from the Wallraf-Richartz Museum, Cologne.

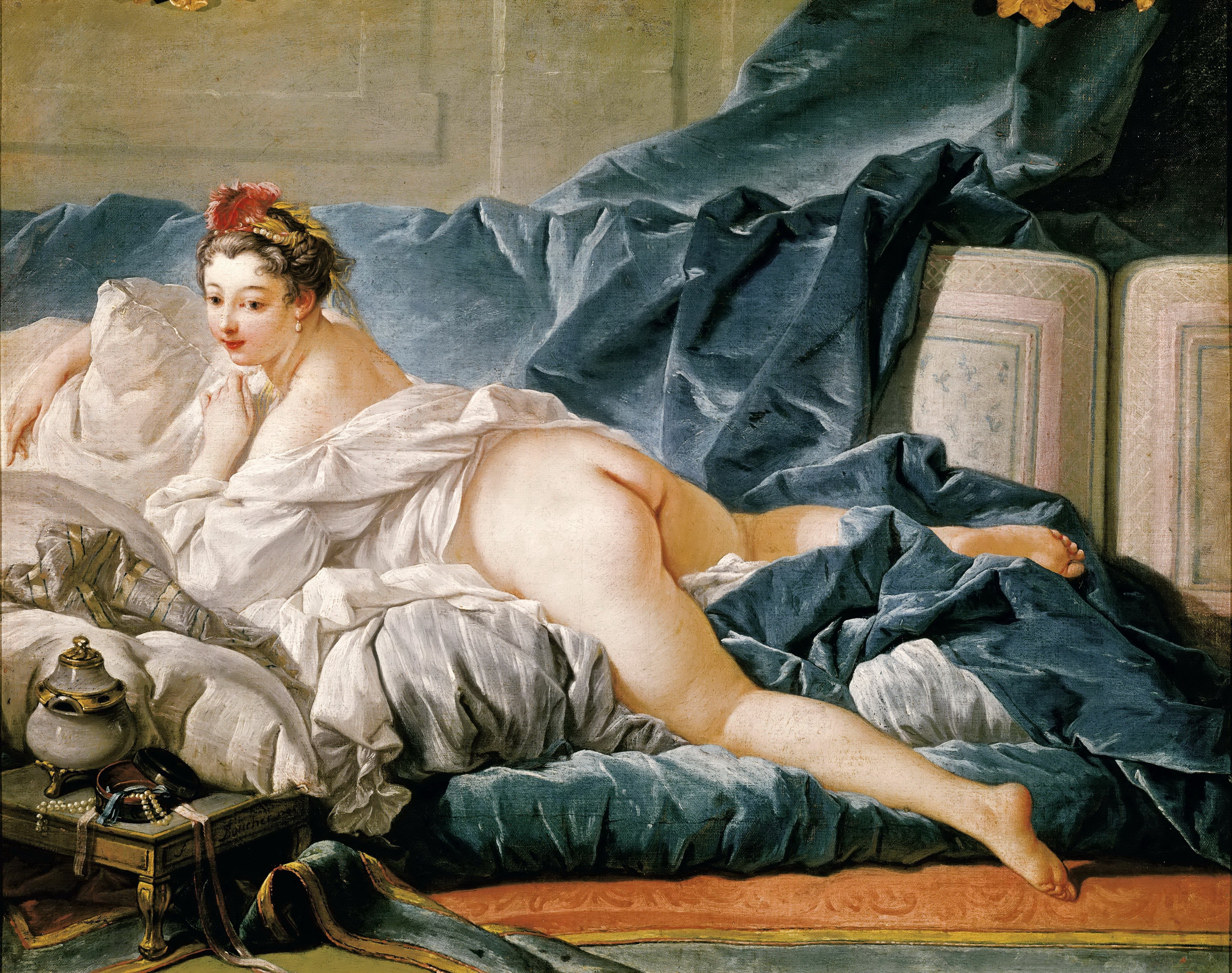
Painting from the Musée du Louvre, Paris.

In his Histoire de ma vie (vol. 3, chap. 11), Giacomo Casanova relates that he found her "a pretty, ragged, dirty, little creature" of thirteen years in the house of her sister, an actress. Struck by her beauty upon seeing her naked, however, he commissioned a nude portrait of her to be made, with the inscription "O-Morphi" (punning her name with Modern Greek ὄμορφη, "beautiful"), a copy of which found its way to King Louis XV, who then asked to see if the original corresponded with the painting:

The skilled artist had drawn her legs and thighs so that the eye could not wish to see more. There I write below: O-Morphi wasn't a Homeric or either Greek word. It simply meant "beautiful".

In his account of those events, which were written many years later, the Venetian seducer seeks to obtain the central role, even though he was perhaps only a partial witness. He did not specifically cite Boucher and seems rather, in the evening of his life, to have recorded this episode from gossip and pamphlets which circulated very freely in Europe at the end of the 18th century. Other sources are more accurate.

Police inspector Jean Meunier echoes in his diary another version of the facts, that circulates in the months following the meeting of Louis XV and Marie-Louise O'Murphy. On 8 May 1753 he wrote very specifically:

They say that the youngest Morfi, fourth sister and therefore the youngest, served as a model of the Boucher painting, he painted her naked and gave or sold the painting to Monsieur de Vandières [brother of Madame de Pompadour] and when the King saw it, became intrigued if the painter hadn't flattered the model, so he asked to see the youngest Morfi, and after their meeting, he found her even better than the painting.

== Petite maîtresse of Louis XV ==
The term petite maîtresse (little mistress) was given to Louis XV's mistresses that were not formally presented at court, and unlike the official mistress (maîtresse-en-titre) did not have an apartment in the Palace of Versailles. Generally recruited by the King's valets in Paris' surroundings, if their affair lasted more than a single night, they were placed in a group of houses in the district of Parc-aux-Cerfs in Versailles, or close to other royal residences. Marie-Louise O'Murphy resided there for two years, from 1753 to 1755.

Different stories circulated about the exact circumstances in which she was presented to the King. As was previously mentioned, according to Meunier's reports, this was thanks to the mediation of Abel-François Poisson de Vandières, brother of Madame de Pompadour, showing Boucher's portrait to Louis XV. Another version supports the theory that the recruitment of Louis XV's little mistresses was done under the control of the inner circle of Madame de Pompadour:

Monsieur de Vandières, Director of the King's Buildings (Bâtiments du Roi) in a letter dated 19 February 1753, gave a peculiar order to the painter Charles-Joseph Natoire in Rome, who provides elements that suggests that he was in possession of the portrait of Marie-Louise O'Murphy made by Boucher, and he was able to show it to the King:

I had a private room that I wanted to enrich with four pieces of the most expert painters of our school. I already had a van Loo, a Boucher and a Pierre. You can judge that lacks a Natoire ... Because the room was very small and secret, I wanted nudity: the painting of Carle who represents the sleeping Antiope, and the painting of Boucher of a young woman lying on her stomach ...

Then it is Dominique-Guillaume Lebel, first valet of the King's chamber, who had the delicate and secret mission to negotiate the "virginity" of the girl and bring her back to Versailles. Thus the Marquis d'Argenson in his diary, dated on 1 April 1753, recorded that "Lebel was in Paris to bring a new virgin ... then he contacted a dressmaker named Fleuret, who provides the lovers with dresses from his shop at Saint Honoré". By 30 March, he still did not know the identity of Marie-Louise O'Murphy and he refers to a "little girl who was a model in Boucher" and the King "would have seen Lebel his valet".

After a miscarriage in mid-1753 which almost killed her (as a result this merely brought Louis XV closer to her because he loved the idea that she had almost died "in service" as a proof of her affection for him), Marie-Louise O'Murphy gave birth to Louis XV's illegitimate daughter, Agathe-Louise de Saint-Antoine de Saint-André, born in Paris on 20 June 1754 and baptized that same day at Saint-Paul as a child of "Louis de Saint-André, Old official of infantry and Louise-Marie de Berhini, resident of Saint-Antoine street", both non-existent persons; the King (who did not want to recognize the offspring born from petites maîtresses and brief affairs) ordered that the newborn must be immediately placed in care of a wet nurse. Subsequently, Agathe-Louise was sent to the Couvent de la Présentation, where she was raised; Louis XV paid a pension for his daughter and appointed Louis Yon, Secretary of the Comptroller of Finances and Jean-Michel Delage, a notary, both trustworthy men, as her legal guardians. (Note: It is unclear if Agathe-Louise ever met her mother, from whom she had been separated at birth. The Abbot Soulavie related later a hypothetical meeting between Marie-Louise O'Murphy and her natural daughter: in the early 1770s, Marie-Louise placed her youngest daughter, Marguerite Victoire Le Normant in the same convent where Agathe-Louise was stayed. Both girls soon became friends without knowing the bond between them. The nuns would later agree that Marie-Louise met her illegitimate daughter but without telling her that she was her real mother; however, Agathe-Louise finally discovered her true identity and once the King knew this, he ordered a final separation between Marie-Louise and their daughter. In November 1773, when Agathe-Louise was old enough to marry, Louis XV granted her letters of Official Recognition of Nobility, which enabled her to marry a nobleman. From then, she was considered a member of "the oldest nobility" (issue de la plus ancienne noblesse). The King also maintained that Agathe-Louise "had the titles and noble qualities acquired by right of birth without it may be required to bring in other securities or evidence we have provided". Beautiful, young, with a strong resemblance with Louis XV and now rich after she received from the King a capital of 223,000 livres, a marriage proposal was presented to the King by his favorite, the Comtesse du Barry: Agathe-Louise could marry her nephew Adolphe du Barry, son of Jean du Barry, who reportedly "had one of the worst reputations of the 18th century". Louis Yon opposed the project, considering the du Barry were "a family of freaks". Finally, was chosen Mans-Jean-René de la Tour du Pin, Marquis de la Charce as the husband of Agathe-Louise, with the wedding being celebrated at the Parisian Convent of the Visitation on 27 December 1773. Despite the rejection of her nephew, the Comtesse du Barry facilitates the debut at the court of the young Marquise de la Charce. Nine months after her marriage, Agathe-Louise dies, probably a consequence of a miscarriage, on 6 September 1774, four months after Louis XV's death.)

== Marie-Louise Morphy de Boisfailly ==
The name of "Marie-Louise Morphy de Boisfailly" that she used in the second part of her life was invented for her first marriage.

After serving as a mistress to the King for almost two years, Marie-Louise O'Murphy made a mistake that was common for many courtesans, that of trying to replace the official mistress. She unwisely tried to unseat the longtime royal favorite, Madame de Pompadour. This ill-judged move quickly resulted in O'Murphy's downfall at court.

In November 1755 Marie-Louise O'Murphy was expelled at night from her home at Parc-aux-Cerfs. Repudiated by the King, she was sent far away from Versailles:

The King ordered her to leave at four in the morning to Paris: there she received the unexpected order to marry and she must obey.

She was hastily married on 25 November 1755, by contract signed before Mr. Patu, notary in Paris, to Jacques Pelet de Beaufranchet, Seigneur d'Ayat (born 5 March 1728). The marriage was arranged by the inner circle of Madame de Pompadour. The Duke of Luynes and the Marquis de Valfons recorded that the Prince of Soubise and the Marquis de Lugeac received the task to find a husband for Marie-Louise O'Murphy and arrange her marriage. The intended husband was chosen with great care: well born, with a good name for the former Petite maîtresse, young and good-looking. Beaufranchet, a good soldier and without fortune, obeyed the King's order.

It was in order to give Marie-Louise O'Murphy a better status before her future in-laws and to spare the aristocrat sensibilities of Beaufranchet, that the young woman received the surname of Morphy de Boisfailly, and called a daughter of Daniel Morphy de Boisfailly, an Irish gentleman. As a dowry, she received the sum of 200,000 livres, a disguised donation from Louis XV, through the father Vanier, canon of the Royal and Collegiate Church of Saint-Paul de Lestrée at Saint-Denis; in addition, she was allowed to keep the clothes and jewelry received from the King during her stay at Parc-aux-Cerfs.

The engagement took place the next day and the wedding was celebrated on 27 November 1755 in the parish of Saints Innocents, in the greatest secrecy. Beaufranchet's parents remained in the province and sent their proxies to the wedding. By the side of Marie-Louise, no family member was present. Her mother was represented by a lawyer of the Parlement called Noël Duval, and none of her sisters was present, perhaps to spare the "mighty Seigneur d'Ayat" a painful confrontation with his humble and scandalous in-laws.

== Later life ==
Soon, the new Dame d'Ayat became pregnant. Her first child, a daughter named Louise Charlotte Antoinette Françoise Pelet de Beaufranchet, was born on 30 October 1756. Thirteen months later, on 5 November 1757, Jacques Pelet de Beaufranchet was killed in action at the battle of Rossbach, and seventeen days later (22 November), Marie-Louise gave birth to a second child, a son, Louis Charles Antoine Pelet de Beaufranchet, the later Comte de Beaufranchet and General under the Republic. (Note: He was a royal page in 1771, lieutenant of infantry in 1774, was probably present as chief of Berruyer's staff at Louis XVI's execution, and served as brigadier-general in Vendee. Suspended as a ci-devant in July 1793, he addressed remonstrances to the minister of war, excusing himself for having been born in a class justly disliked, and mentioning his mother, then at Havre with her grandchildren, but making no reference to his father. Through the influence of Louis Desaix, his cousin, he was in 1798 allowed a retiring pension; he sat in the Corps Legislatif in 1803, and died at Paris 2 July 1812.)

Her daughter Louise Charlotte died on 6 February 1759, aged two. Thirteen days later, on 19 February at Riom, Marie-Louise married her second husband, François Nicolas Le Normant, Comte de Flaghac and Receiver General of Finance in Riom (born 13 September 1725), a divorcee with three children. Her new husband being a distant cousin of Charles Guillaume Le Normant d'Étiolles and Charles François Paul Le Normant de Tournehem, through this marriage Marie-Louise became related to Madame de Pompadour. In addition, and thanks to her closeness with Abbot Ferray, the former royal mistress was able to enter into the finance world and thanks to the traffic of influences, had access to the Ferme générale, which enabled her to expand her assets and fortune. From her second marriage, Marie-Louise gave birth to a daughter, Marguerite Victoire Le Normant de Flaghac (5 January 1768 – 25 January 1830), who, according to one theory, could be another illegitimate daughter of Louis XV. (Note: Authors like Camille Pascal, identify Marguerite Victoire as a daughter of Louis XV; the connection between the King and the new Comtesse de Flaghac having very probably known new episodes, in particular during March 1767. This paternity of Louis XV is supported by three facts: The King gave Marie-Louise O'Murphy the sum of 350,000 livres between 1771–1772 (Marguerite, then a three-years-old child, surpassed the dangerous first year of infancy, and Louis XV probably wanted to protect the mother of his child).; When Marguerite married firstly in 1786, the contract was entered into in the presence and with the approval of the King and Queen, and the entire royal family. This contract bears the signatures of Louis XVI, Marie Antoinette, the Count and Countess of Provence, the Count and Countess of Artois and Madame Elizabeth.; After the Bourbon Restoration, King Charles X gave Marguerite an "annual indemnity" of 2,000 francs from his own treasure and had her entered on the Civil List for a life pension of 3,000 francs.)

In 1779, she bought a palace in Paris at the Rue du Faubourg-Poissonière, built in 1773 in the neoclassical style by the architect Samson-Nicolas Lenoir, known as the Hôtel Benoist de Sainte Paulle, which still stands today. In 1782 at Villennes-sur-Seine, she bought the Migneaux estate, where she had a house built. After the death of her second husband on 24 April 1783 (who left her a pension of 12,000 francs), she had to resell this property in 1785.

On 22 September 1787, she bought from the Choiseuls, for the amount 220,000 livres, a lordship in Soisy-sous-Etiolles, in the immediate vicinity of Etiolles, the former residence of the Marquise de Pompadour. In the last years of the Ancien Régime, Marie-Louise was very close to Claude Antoine de Valdec de Lessart, appointed Controller General of Finance, at the end of 1790, following Necker's dismissal. In 1791, he also became Minister of the Interior but was arrested on 10 March 1792 and massacred by sans-culottes on 9 September 1792.

Following the murder of Valdec de Lessart, Marie-Louise then retired to Le Havre, and, unable to flee the country, returned to her castle in Soisy-sous-Etiolles, where she was arrested in February 1794. She was then incarcerated as a "suspect", under the name of O'Murphy, at Sainte-Pélagie Prison and later at the English Benedictine convent in Paris, known as the Couvent des Anglaises. The influence of her son and that of her nephew General Louis Desaix (son of her sister-in-law Amable de Beaufranchet) enabled her to escape the guillotine, and she was released after the fall of Robespierre in July 1794.

After her release, Marie-Louise found a new protector in the person of Louis Philippe Dumont (17 November 1765 – 11 June 1853), a moderate MP for Calvados in the National Convention and twenty-eight years younger than her. They married on 19 June 1795 at Soisy-sous-Etiolles; however, this union quickly failed, and after almost three years, they divorced on 16 March 1798. She never married again.

In 1795, she sold her Parisian palace. On 7 December 1798, she resold her domain of Soisy-sous-Etiolles to General Lecourbe, and spent the rest of her life in retirement.

In 1811 her first great-grandchild was born, Louise Antoinette Zoé Terreyre (daughter of Anne Pauline Victoire Laure Pelet de Beaufranchet d'Ayat, who was the daughter of Marie-Louise's son, the Comte de Beaufranchet). Another great-grandchild, Louise Thérèse Mesnard de Chousy (daughter of Alfred Mesnard, comte de Chousy, son of Marguerite Victoire Le Normant de Flaghac), became the wife of Edmond-Charles de Martimprey, a French soldier, who briefly served as Governor General of Algeria, and then became Senator of France during the Second French Empire.

Marie-Louise O'Murphy died in Paris on 11 December 1814 aged 77, at the home of her daughter, Marguerite Le Normant.

== Bibliography ==
- Casanova, Giacomo: Histoire de ma vie, F.A. Brockhaus, Wiesbaden et Plon, Paris 1960–1961.
- Pascal, Camille (2006). Le goût du roi, Louis XV et Marie-Louise O'Murphy (in French). Paris: Perrin. ISBN 2-262-01704-2.
- Schulz, Alexander: Louison O'Morphy. Bouchers Modell für das Ruhende Mädchen, Isny, Andreas Schultz, 1998, 80 p.
- Sprott, Duncan: Our Lady of the potatoes, Faber and Faber, Londres, 1997, 235 p.
