= Helen Chadwick =

British sculptor, photographer and artist

- Born: Helen Clare Chadwick; 18 May 1953; Croydon, South London, England
- Died: 15 March 1996 (aged 42); Camden, London, England
- Education: Croydon College; University of Brighton; Chelsea College of Art
- Known for: Conceptual art, installation art

Helen Chadwick (18 May 1953 – 15 March 1996) was a British sculptor, photographer and installation artist. In 1987, she became one of the first women artists to be nominated for the Turner Prize. Chadwick was known for "challenging stereotypical perceptions of the body in elegant yet unconventional forms. Her work draws from a range of sources, from myths to science, grappling with a plethora of unconventional, visceral materials that included chocolate, lambs' tongues and rotting vegetable matter. Her skilled use of traditional fabrication methods and sophisticated technologies transform these unusual materials into complex installations". Maureen Paley noted that "Helen was always talking about craftsmanship—a constant fount of information". Binary opposition was a strong theme in Chadwick's work; seductive/repulsive, male/female, organic/man-made. Her combinations "emphasise yet simultaneously dissolve the contrasts between them". Her gender representations forge a sense of ambiguity and a disquieting sexuality blurring the boundaries of ourselves as singular and stable beings."

== Early life and education ==
Helen Chadwick was born on 18 May 1953 in Croydon, England. Her mother, who was Greek, met her father, who was from East London, in Athens, Greece during the Second World War, when he was serving in the British Forces there. When he was demobilised and returned to Britain, they continued corresponding, and Chadwick's mother eventually relocated to Britain and they got married. They moved to live in Croydon in 1946, where Chadwick was born. After Chadwick left Croydon High School, she embarked on a Fine Art Foundation course at Croydon College, then went on to study at Brighton Polytechnic (1973–76). She recalled, "Traditional media were never dynamic enough… right from early on in art school, I wanted to use the body to create a set of inter-relationships with the audience". Her degree show Domestic Sanitation (1976) consisted of her and three other women, 'wearing' latex costumes painted directly on to the skin, engaging in a satirical feminist round of cleaning and grooming. In 1976, Chadwick moved to Hackney and enrolled in a Masters course at Chelsea College of Art (1976–77). For her MA degree she created In the Kitchen (1977) in which she and three other female performers dressed in costumes that Chadwick had made by covering metal frameworks in PVC. The costumes represented gendered kitchen appliances, such as an oven in which the cooking rings resemble a breastplate. Also that year, she and two dozen other artists moved into Beck Road, Hackney, a double strip of Victorian terraces that was earmarked for demolition. After squatting for two years they persuaded the Inner London Education Authority to rent out, rather than demolish, the houses. Beck Road became a hive of home studios whose residents included Maureen Paley, Ray Walker and Genesis P-Orridge.

== Career ==
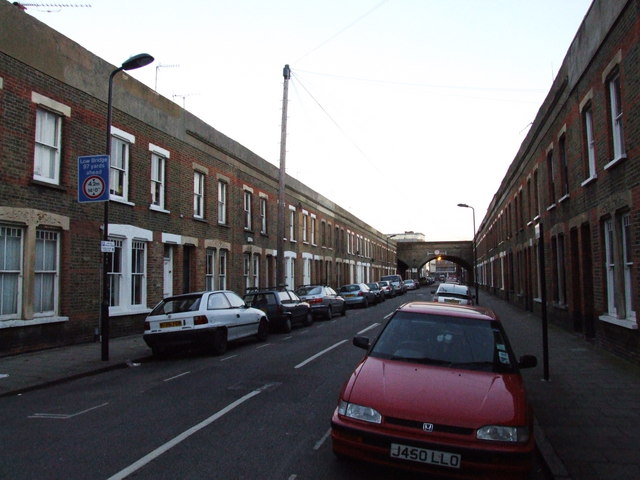
Beck Road, Hackney, where Chadwick lived

Chadwick began exhibiting regularly from 1977, gradually building her reputation as an artist. Her rise into the public sphere was marked by the inclusion of her work Ego Geometria Sum (1983) in a group exhibition entitled Summer Show I (1983) at the Serpentine. In 1985 she began an active teaching career as a visiting lecturer across a number of London art schools. Her posts at Goldsmiths (1985–90), Chelsea College of Arts, London (1985–95), Central Saint Martins, London (1987–95) and the Royal College of Art (1990–94) ensured an important influence on contemporary British Art in the late 1980s and '90s, specifically on the Young British Artists.

Chadwick's work really came to prominence with Of Mutability (1984-86), a large installation involving sculpture and photography at the Institute of Contemporary Arts, London. This exhibition that toured a number of venues in England, Scotland and Switzerland resulted in her nomination for the Turner Prize in 1987 alongside British painter Thérèse Oulton. They were the first women nominated for Britain's most prestigious contemporary art award.

In 1990 Chadwick was invited to exhibit in a photography festival in Houston, Texas, where she met a local artist, David Notarius. The following year he moved to Beck Road and they married.

In the summer of 1994, Chadwick's exhibition Effluvia opened at the Serpentine, London. This exhibition marked the high point of Chadwick's exposure, receiving widespread critical attention and national press coverage. The exhibition was seen by 54,000 visitors, breaking the record for the gallery. In 1995, Chadwick received her first solo exhibition in the United States at the Museum of Modern Art, New York, entitled Helen Chadwick: Bad Blooms. In 1995, Chadwick took up an artist residency in the assisted conception unit at King's College Hospital, London, photographing IVF embryos rejected for implantation. She used the photos in Unnatural Selection, a series on which she was working when she died. Chadwick's work is included in the collections at the Victoria and Albert Museum, The Tate and the Museum of Modern Art.

== Gender representation ==
Chadwick's earlier work utilised her naked form, questioning the representation of the female body and addressing what Chadwick called "the issue of the female body as a site of desire". She attempted to complicate the conventional passive objectification of women. "I was looking at a vocabulary for desire where I was the subject and the object and the author" she said; "I felt by directly taking all these roles, the normal situation in which the viewer operated as a kind of voyeur broke down". Her BA graduate performance Domestic Sanitation (1976) attempted to highlight the distinction between nudity and nakedness. Her performers wore another latex skin to cover their skin suggesting the imposition of idealised femininity while they carried out stereotypical female activities.

Many critics, including former feminist colleagues, concluded that she reinforced the stereotypes she sought to subvert. As was the case for other women artists that were reclaiming their bodies through their art practice, she was accused of regressive female narcissism. Chadwick declared that "I'm disappointed that a false rationalism is used as a stick with which to measure what I'm doing when I am looking to cross the taboos that have been instigated. I hate being hauled up as an example of negative women's work." In 1988 Chadwick made a conscious decision "...not to represent my body.... It immediately declares female gender and I wanted to be more deft." Her practice then moved inside the body to flesh in her Meat Abstracts (1989) and Meat Lamps (1989-91) and to bodily excrement's in Piss Flowers (1991–92). Chadwick commented, "I felt compelled to use materials that were still bodily, that were still a kind of self-portrait, but did not rely on representation of my own body".

Through her career Chadwick's concerns with gender representation moved from the objectification of women to more closely examine what gender is. Working in a time surrounded by debates around the cultural construction of gender, her work was fuelled by writings of Julia Kristeva and Michel Foucault. She would often cite Herculine Barbin, a nineteenth century hermaphrodite, whose memoirs were discovered and printed by Foucault in 1980. Chadwick commented, "Why do we feel compelled to read gender, and automatically wish to sex the body before us so we can orientate our desire and thus gain pleasure or reject what we see?" Chadwick's Piss Flowers (1991–92) questions the singularity and specificity of gender through an inversion of gender roles. Chadwick elaborated her interest in deconstructing gender binaries in a lecture she gave in 1991: "in language dual structures are defined as oppositional: where we have self, there must be other; gender is male or female, and most problematic and absurd of all is the split between mind and body".

== Works ==
=== Ego Geometria Sum (1983) ===
Ego Geometria Sum is an attempt to trace one's body back "through a succession of geometric solids". The work comprises ten plywood sculptures that reflect the mass of the artist's body at a succession of ages from premature birth to maturity at 30. Each sculpture takes the form of an object that symbolises that age, for example an incubator or a pram. The artist in her notebooks described the forms as "objects that a) contained me b) (re)oriented me c) moulded / shaped me". The work is printed with pictures of the object, places that relate to it and Chadwick's naked form, that conforms to the sculptures shape. While this is certainly an autobiographical work, Chadwick makes a purpose of not showing her face to emphasise a universal quality. The overlapping and juxtaposition of images speaks to the connectedness of the self and the world. The artist's notes at this time suggest that the work was an attempt to "go back in memory to the origin of symptoms" of a sense of alienation that she felt. She attempts to free the ego from the traumas of the past.

The accompanying photographs in this installation entitled The Labours I-X, show the naked artist bracing as she lifts each of the sculptures. The title refers to the mythical labours of Hercules that he is sentenced to after he kills his own children in a fit of rage. Chadwick's use of it suggests that attempting to encapsulate personal history is a Herculean task, requiring great strength and courage.

=== Loop My Loop (1991) ===
Loop My Loop is a back-lit cibachrome photograph of blond hair intertwined with a pig's intestines. The golden locks signify purity and love knotted with the intestines, which signifies the raw animalistic side to human nature. This work has links with the ideas of Georges Bataille, a French intellectual and literary figure who worked in fields such as anthropology, sociology, and history of art. Chadwick's Loop My Loop is similar to her work from 1990, titled Nostalgie de la Boue. In this work, two rounded cibachrome transparencies were hung one above the other. The top one contained a ring of earthworms, while the bottom pictured someone's scalp with the center imploding. Both images appear similar, but by placing the worms above the human scalp the distinction upholding the human above the animal is no longer held.

=== Piss Flowers (1991–1992) ===
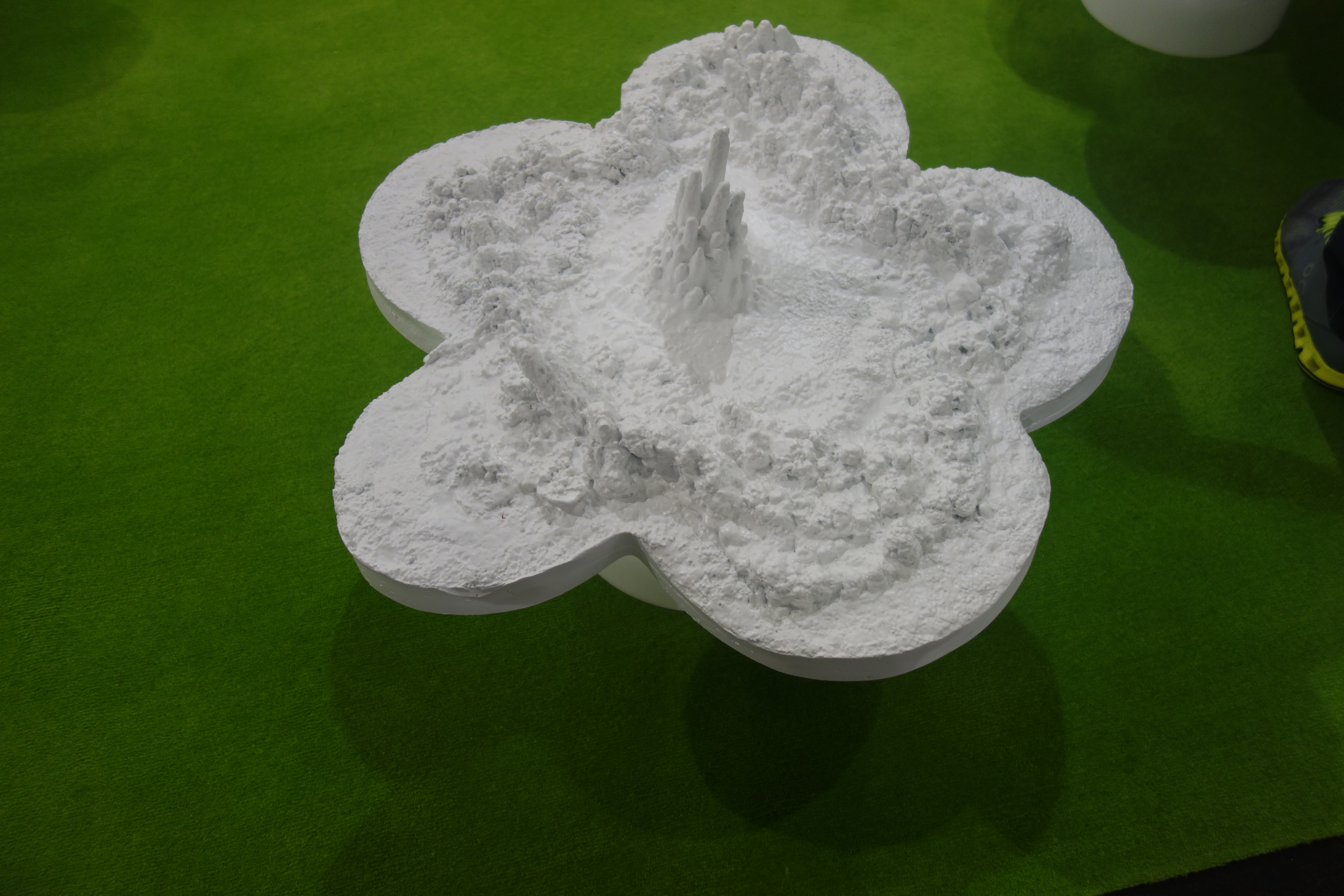
Helen Chadwick, Piss Flowers

Piss Flowers is a work made up of twelve sculptures that Chadwick made while on a residency at the Banff Centre for the Arts in Alberta, Canada, in February 1991. During their stay, she and her partner, David Notarius travelled to different locations, made mounds of snow and laid out a flower shaped metal cutter. They would take turns to urinate in the snow then pour plaster into the cavities. These casts were attached to pedestals that were based on a hyacinth bulb. The whole thing was then cast in bronze and enamelled white.

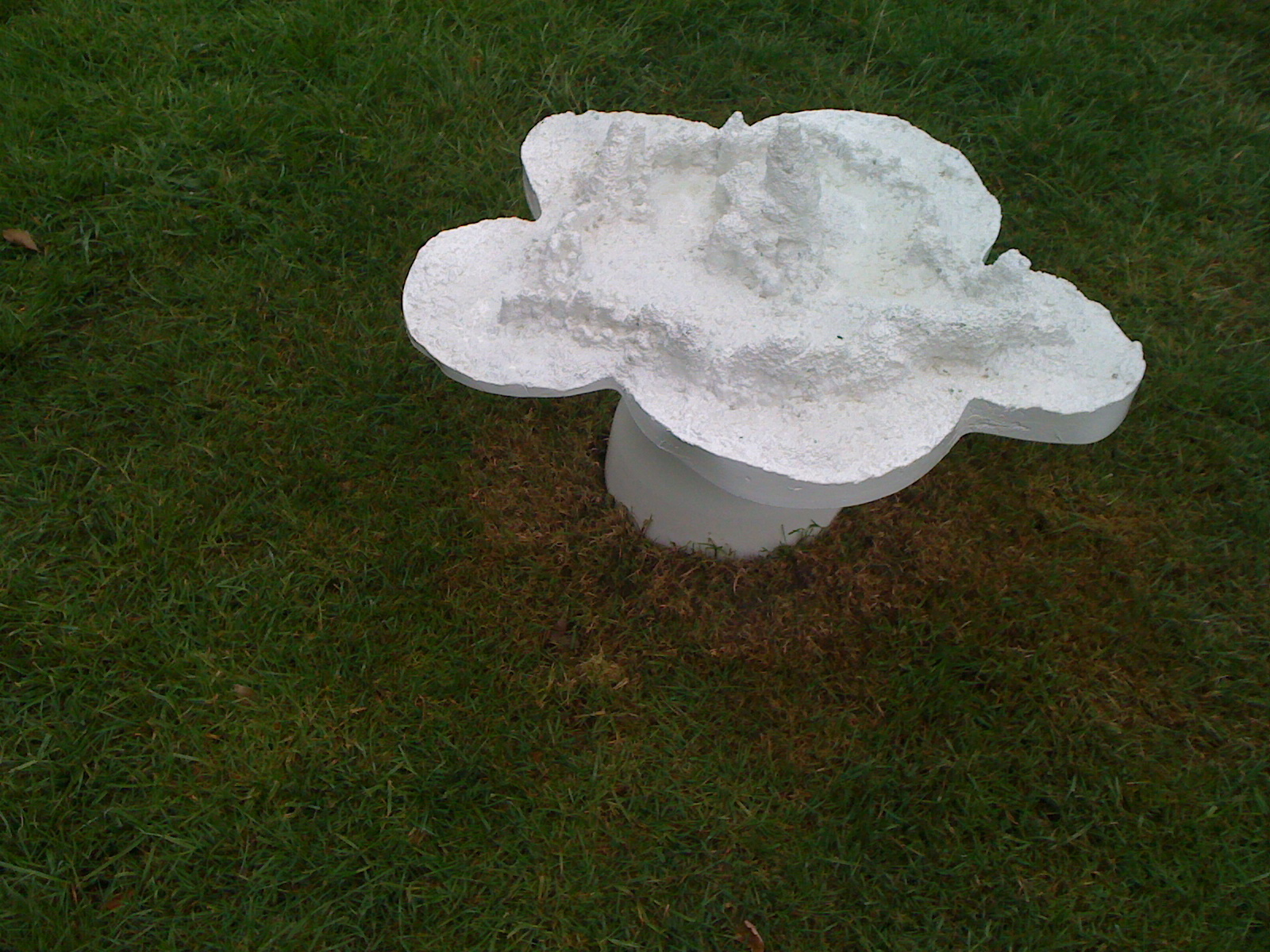
Another Piss Flower

The works are a result of her physical contact with the location, preserving a direct impact of reality. Chadwick describes the flowers as a "metaphysical conceit for the union of two people expressing themselves bodily". The work utilises the pleasure of taboo; elevating the medium of urine that is generally regarded as polluting and marginal in a dynamic and playful way. "It may have been mischievous to piss in the snow, but it was damn hard work to end up with the 12 bronzes", Chadwick recalled. "Piss Flowers took two years, largely because I had to find £12,000 to make them". The artist "sold herself" to make a programme about Frida Kahlo for the BBC in order to fund the work.

The use of a flower as the form was significant for Chadwick because they are the bisexual reproductive organs of plants containing both male and female sex organs. The woman's urine flow is strong and hot, resulting in a central penile form; the man's is diffuse and cooler, and creates the labial circumference. In a poem entitled Piss Posy (1991) Chadwick describes the works as "Vaginal towers with male skirt/ Gender bending water sport?". Chadwick plays on sexual difference, reversing gender roles and provoking uncertainty of the singularity and specificity of gender. Piss Flowers "synthesise sexual difference through the erotic play both of their making and their forms".

== Exhibitions ==
=== Of Mutability (1986) ===
Of Mutability was Chadwick's first major solo exhibition, held at the Institute of Contemporary Arts in 1986. Chadwick utilised the ceremonial character of the elegant neo-classical rooms of the upper galleries to house an installation made up of a number of autonomous artworks. One room was at the centre of the exhibition and took the name of The Oval Court (1984–86), an ovoid platform that lay in the middle of the space. The platform presents a twelve-part collage of layered blue toned A4 photocopies made directly of the artist's naked form, dead animals, plants and drapery suspended in an ovoid pool. The work speaks to the still life, evoking vanitas tradition in its subtle depictions of the transience of the things we surround ourselves with. Twelve figures, according to the artist's notes, represent the "12 gates to paradise", where she achieves "oneness with all living things". Five golden spheres rest atop the platform corresponding to the finger placing's of a huge hand, alluding to the touch of divine. On the walls of this room were photographs of the artist weeping, a Venetian glass mirror and printouts of computer-rendered drawings of the Baroque columns from the baldacchino of St Peter's in Rome. Chadwick's use of her own body invokes a human attachment to the world, suggesting that the concept of self is infinitely subject to change.

The second room housed Carcass (1986), a two-metre-high glass tower of rotting vegetable matter that moves and lives. It begins to compost, generating new organisms over time, Chadwick had to top it up daily to maintain its levels. During the exhibition a small leak appeared in the tower and in a state of panic the ICA staff laid the column, splitting a seam. When they attempted to lay it on its side, ten gallons of fermented liquid sloshed and blew off the end of the tower. Newspapers broadcast this accident, bringing attention to Chadwick as an exciting nonconforming artist.

=== Effluvia (1994) ===
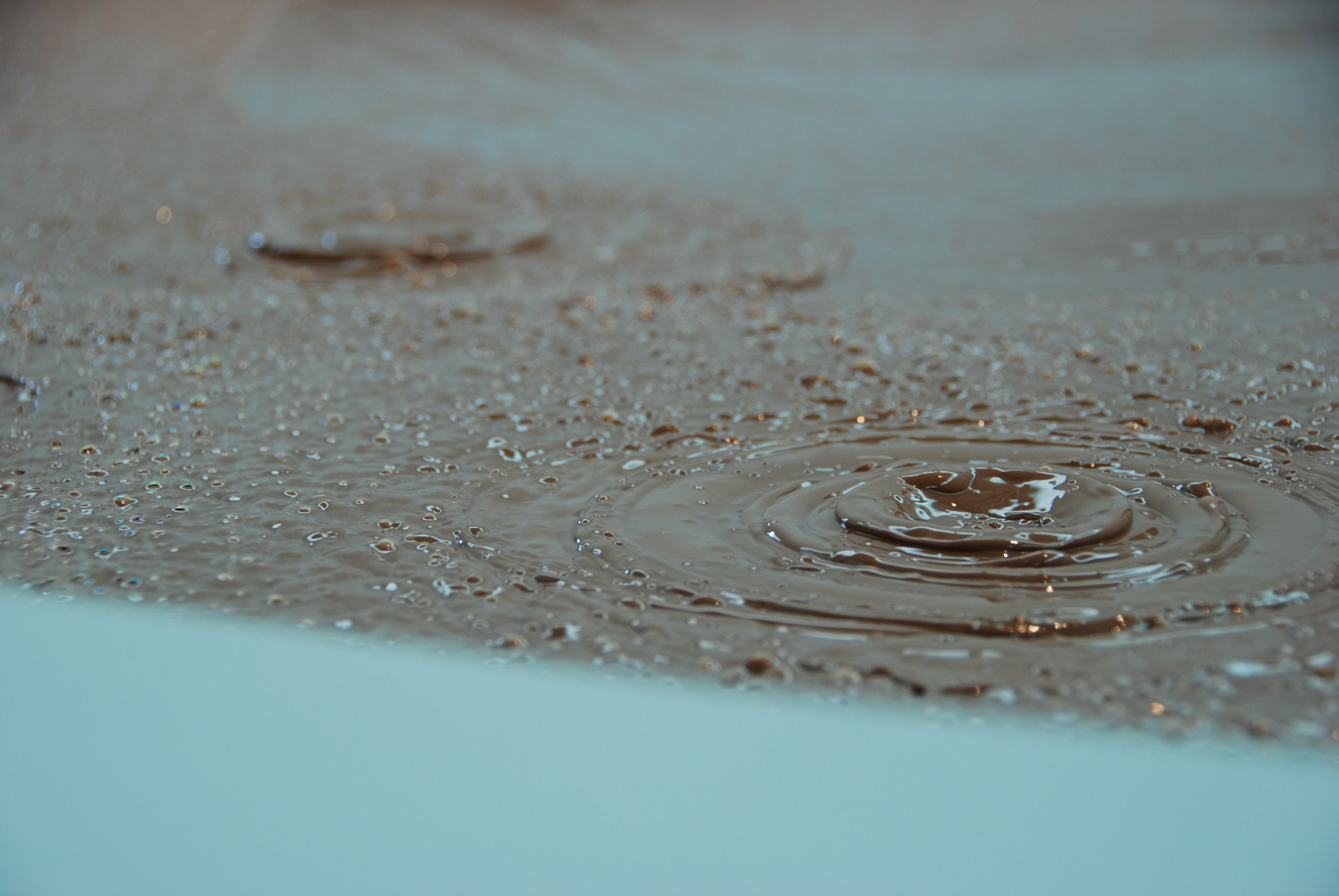
Helen Chadwick's Cacao

Effluvia responded to the parkland setting of the Serpentine; the installation was created in the form of a garden, surrounding themes of tamed and untamed nature with such works as Piss Flowers (1991–92) and a fountain of molten chocolate entitled Cacao (1994). The exhibition also contained a number of Chadwick's other important works including Viral Landscapes, a series of works where the artist combined images of cell groups with visually appropriate parts of the Pembrokeshire coastline in Wales. These works explore the relation between host and virus as a metaphor for that between the individual and the world. In the next room Chadwick exhibited a selection of her Meat Lamps (1989–91), large-format Polaroid images of meat slabs, bulbs, drapery and other visceral materials that were displayed on light boxes, often with an aura of light spilling around them. Chadwick set out to deconstruct binary opposition by reducing the work to present flesh as flesh. The exhibition also included new works Glossolalia (1993) and I Thee Wed (1993) that consisted of lamb tongues cast in bronze, fox pelts, and vegetables encircled in rings of fur.

Along with Piss Flowers (see Piss Flowers section), Cacao attracted the most attention. The work is a fountain of liquid chocolate whose smell permeates the gallery, the form evokes both phallus and flower. Associations with earth, shit and "base matter" are disturbing and simultaneously liberating, speaking to the pleasures of excess and the subject as a desiring self. When asked the reason for making this work Chadwick explained "my libido demanded it", describing it as "a pool or primal matter, sexually indeterminate, in a perpetual state of flux". On the walls that surrounded Cacao were Chadwick's Wreaths of Pleasure (1992–93), a series of circular luminous photographs framed in enamelled metal that are over a metre in circumference. Combining delicate suspensions of flowers and fruit in household liquids such as hair gel and milk, the work alludes to a fluidity of boundaries. The artist challenges the notions of a centred stable subjectivity, suggesting a constant permeation of self.

== Death and legacy ==
Chadwick died suddenly at age 42 of a heart attack in 1996. Although they declared no proof, pathologists suggested a link between her heart attack and a viral infection causing a myocarditis – an inflammation of the heart muscle that could have been triggered anywhere between the last few years of her life and the last weeks.

In 2004–2005 a retrospective of Chadwick's work organised by the Barbican Art Gallery toured four major galleries. These were the Barbican Art Gallery (London, UK), Liljevalchs konsthall (Stockholm, Sweden), Trapholt Kunstmuseum (Kolding, Denmark) and Manchester Art Gallery (Manchester, UK). In the preface to the catalogue, Marina Warner states that after the shock of Chadwick's death it took some time for "interest to return and for understanding to develop of her critical opus and her place in contemporary art".

Chadwick's impact on the British art scene as an artist and teacher helped pave the way for the Young British Artist (YBA) generation. Her expanded use of materials can be seen carried through the work of many these artists. Without Chadwick's Cacao, for example, it is impossible to imagine Anya Gallaccio's chocolate and flower installations. Since Chadwick's Barbican-organised retrospective, the full measure of her contribution to the trajectory of contemporary British art is starting to be realised. The Richard Saltoun Gallery in London represents the estate of Helen Chadwick, and has continued to show her work. Works From The Estate (2013) marked what would have been her 60th birthday, showing some of Chadwick's most famous works. The following year Bad Blooms (2014) exhibited Chadwick's Wreaths of Pleasure (1992–93).

Eight of Chadwick's notebooks, which reveal her ideas and critical practice through the making of a number of her works, are available online from The Leeds Museums & Galleries and the Henry Moore Institute Archive.

Tate Modern showed a retrospective of Chadwick's work from late September 2024 until June 2025.
