= The Blonde Odalisque =

Two paintings by François Boucher

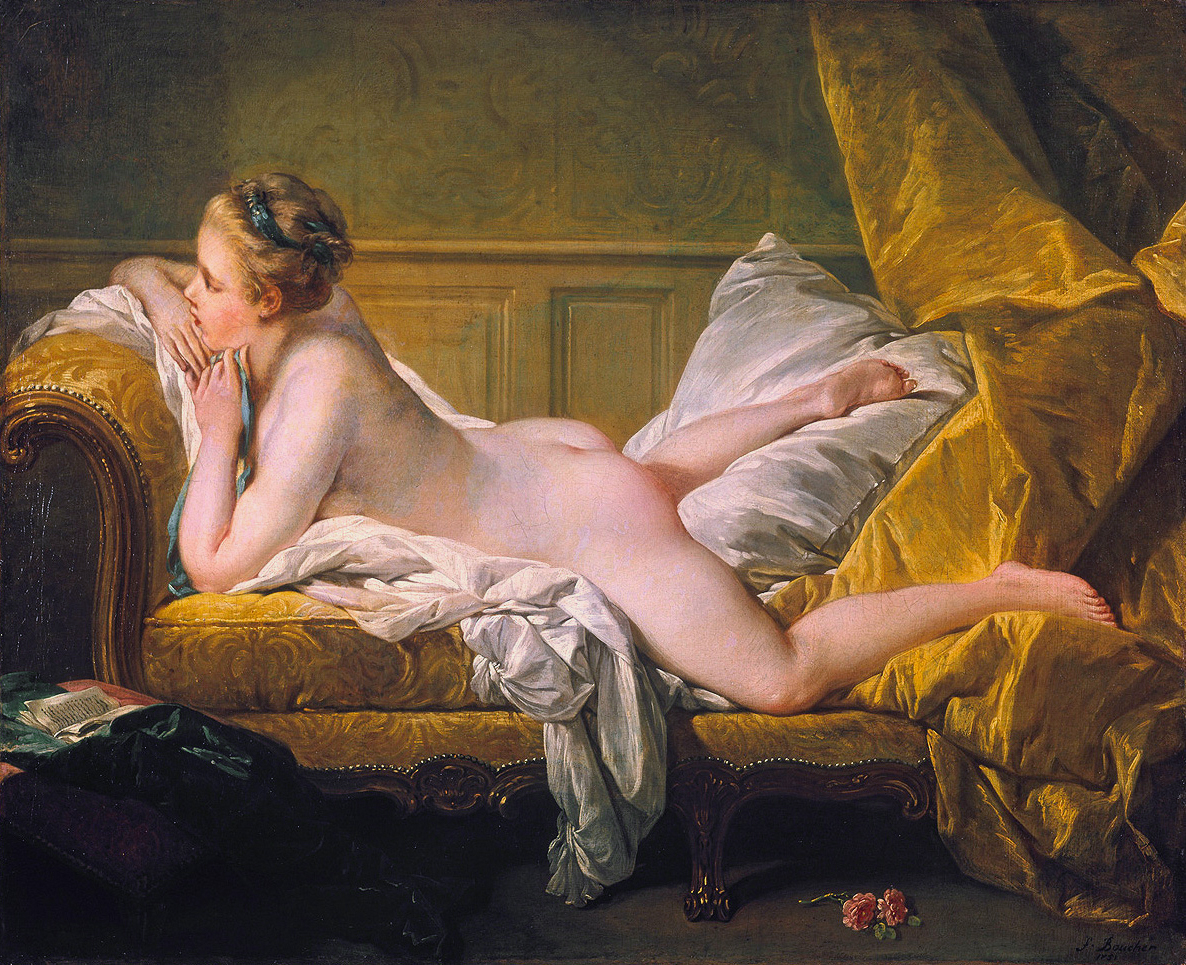
The 1751 version of the painting, which is currently held in the Wallraf–Richartz Museum in Cologne.

The 1752 version of the painting, which is currently held in the Alte Pinakothek in Munich.

The Blonde Odalisque, or Resting Girl (French: Jeune fille allongée, Jeune fille couchée or L'Odalisque blonde), are two oil-on-canvas paintings by the French painter François Boucher. The paintings feature a naked woman on her stomach on a couch. The first was made in 1751, whilst the second was made in 1752, although both were made by Boucher. The nude figure is thought to be Marie-Louise O'Murphy, one of the many mistresses of King Louis XV of France, who was only 14-15 years old when the painting was made. The paintings fall into the odalisque genre.

== Analysis ==
Boucher's The Blonde Odalisque, or Resting Girl, is filled with soft pastel colors such as pinks, yellows, and blues. The profusion of flowery tones boldly embodies the Rococo era. The nude girl and suggestive symbols throughout the painting help convey an eroticism. The different shades of yellow throughout the piece create a serene tone that accentuates the girl's pinkish nude body. The viewer's eye is directed to the girl by the drapes that hang down the side of the room. The open book that seems to be abandoned, the lone rose left on the floor, and even her expression can be interpreted a few different ways. She could either be surprised or anxious. Maybe someone is entering the room that she wasn't expecting, or she could be waiting anxiously for someone to arrive.

== Background ==
Intimacy and delicacy are common themes found in Boucher's work. Venus Consoling Love and The Triumph of Venus are two of Boucher's other works that convey these themes. Both pieces show how Boucher's work progressed and helped pave the way to creating The Blonde Odalisque'. His painting style is soft and delicate, yet bold brush strokes are representative of common Rococo themes such as delicacy and beauty.

Boucher and Marie-Louise O'Murphy met through their affiliation with the Académie royale de peinture et de sculpture in Paris, which is also known as the Academy of Painting. Boucher was the principal painter at the academy when he met Marie and chose her to be his chief model. Boucher claimed to have relied on Marie's looks for inspiration for his future paintings. Marie quickly succeeded as a model at the Academy of Painting and was eventually recognized by King Louis XV and became his youngest mistress.

== Marie-Louise O'Murphy ==
The woman seen in the painting is Marie-Louise O'Murphy, an Irish woman who was also known as Louison. Born in 1737, she was only 14 years old when she modeled for this painting. After the painting was commissioned by the French court of the Ancien Régime, King Louis XV was so intrigued by the painting that he summoned her for himself, becoming the King's youngest mistress. She stayed with the King for two years before she was seen as a threat to his other mistresses and was caught asking the King personal questions. She was later asked to leave the Parc-aux-Cerfs, which was what Louis XV's secret brothel was called. Madame de Pompadour, Louis XV's most famous mistress, would regularly dismiss young mistresses for trying to get closer to Louis XV; these accusations are often overlooked.

== See also ==
- 100 Great Paintings, 1980 BBC series
- Nude (art)
