= Fatty liver hemorrhagic syndrome =

Disease of birds

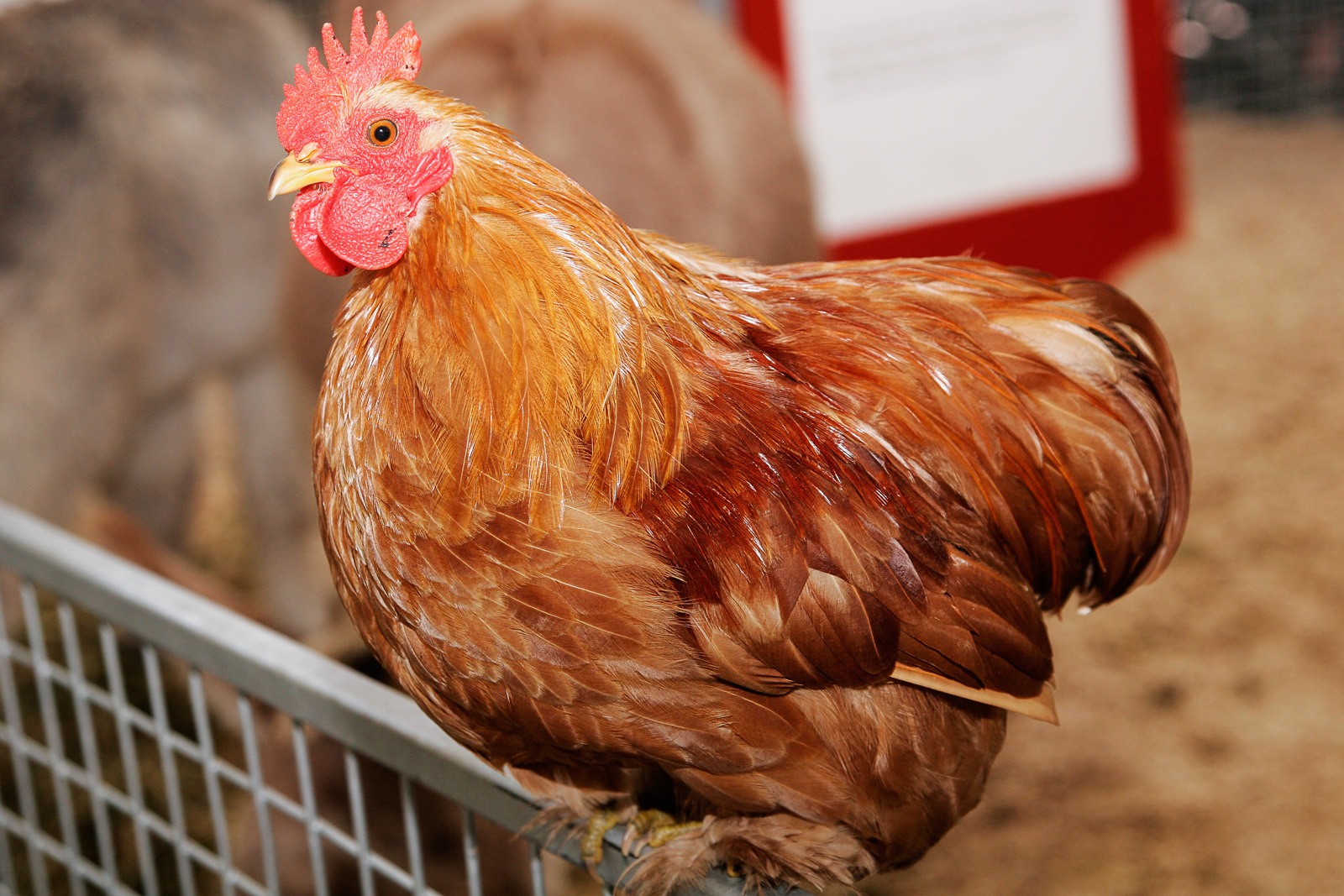
Chicken

Fatty liver hemorrhagic syndrome (also referred to as fatty liver syndrome or FLHS), a disease in chickens and other birds. Birds with this disease have large amounts of fat deposited in their liver and abdomen. This often results in an enlarged liver that is easily damaged and prone to bleeding. In some cases the disease is fatal, usually as a result of blood loss from an internal hemorrhage in the liver. The hemorrhage often occurs when a hen is straining to lay her egg. Fatty liver hemorrhagic syndrome is "the major cause of mortality in laying hens."

== Causes ==
Excessive dietary energy intake is believed to be the cause of fatty liver hemorrhagic syndrome. Heredity may also play a role, but it is not the entire cause for the disease. Birds housed in cages will more likely be affected because they are unable to exercise to burn off the extra dietary energy. A 2019 study showed 74% of caged hens died from FLHS whereas only 0–5% of mortalities in hens from cage-free barn or free-range systems were attributed to this condition. Walking hens are less likely to develop this problem. The disease is observed most often in birds that appear to be healthy and in a state of high egg production. As a result, death can occur quite unexpectedly.

== Symptoms ==
Affected birds are usually overweight and may also have pale combs. Generally, however, the disease has few or no symptoms prior to the bird's death.

== Treatment ==
Additional information needed The use of L-Tryptophan in the diet can decrease the syndrome.
