= Vilce Manor =

Manor in Latvia

Coordinates: 56°25′14″N 23°32′32″E

Vilce Manor is a historic manor estate covering 270.52 hectares, located in Vilce, Jelgava Municipality Latvia. Construction of the manor house began in the mid-18th century, and over time the manor was owned by several Baltic German noble families, including the von Medem, von Keyserlingk, von Grotthuss, and von Hahn families. The Vilce Manor complex comprises the manor house, farm buildings, residential structures, and a park. Following the agrarian reform of 1921, Vilce School was relocated to the manor house, where it has remained since.

== Owners ==
In 1462, Johann von Mengede, Master of the Livonian Order, granted landed estate between the Svēte, Vilce, and Platone rivers to Claus von Medeheym. In 1748, the Vilce manor was inherited by Kristoph Dietrich von Medem, who was married to Countess Anna von Keyserlingk. Both the Medem and Keyserling families supported the accession of Prince Charles of Saxony to the ducal throne of Courland and, following the return of Ernst Johan von Biron from exile in 1763, they became opposition. The situation of the Medem family changed when the daughters of Johann Friedrich von Medem appeared at court: Elisabeth, later a writer and a figure of the German Enlightenment, and Dorothea, who later became the wife of Duke Peter von Biron. It was this marriage that brought the Medem family the title of Counts of the Holy Roman Empire in 1779. In 1812, following the death of Carl Dietrich von Medem, the Vilce estate was put up for auction. In 1818, it was purchased by Dietrich Johann von Grotthuss. In 1824, the Vilce manor was inherited by his daughter Adelheide Agnes Maria, who was married to Johann Friedrich Wilhelm von Hahn. The last owner of the manor was Franz von Hahn. During the Latvian land reform, in the land redistribution plans of 1921 and 1923, it was envisaged that the 270.52 hectares formerly belonging to Vilce Manor would be divided into nine new farms. The manor house and the manor center were adapted to house Vilce Second-Level Primary School. Franz von Hahn retained ownership of Karenbeck manor.

== Alessandro Cagliostro ==
In 1779, the Sicilian adventurer, mystic, and self-proclaimed prophet Alessandro Cagliostro (born Giuseppe Balsamo) arrived in Jelgava, presenting himself as a Spanish count and colonel. He gained the confidence of the owner of Vilce Manor by staging magical seances and speaking of hidden treasure allegedly buried at the estate six hundred years earlier. Although Cagliostro had never previously visited Vilce Manor, he produced a drawing indicating the supposed location of the treasure. Subsequently, Cagliostro, accompanied by his wife, Serafina Feliciani, as well as Johann Friedrich von Medem and his daughter Elisa von der Recke, travelled to Vilce, where he indicated the site of the treasure in the forest. When Cagliostro became involved in the Affair of the Diamond Necklace in 1786, he cited Elisa von der Recke and her sister, Dorothea von Medem, Duchess of Courland, as witnesses who could vouch for his integrity. Outraged by the use of her name, Elisa von der Recke published the book Nachricht von des berüchtigten Cagliostro Aufenthalt in Mitau im Jahre 1779 und dessen magischen Operationen (Report on the Stay of the Notorious Cagliostro in Mitau in 1779 and His Magical Operations), exposing his deceptions. The work became a bestseller throughout Europe.

== Manor house ==
Construction of the manor house at Vilce Manor was initiated during the lifetime of Kristoph Dietrich Georg von Medem (1721–1782), around 1750s–1760s. This is indicated by the surviving Baroque portal, which features the alliance coat of arms of the Medem and Count Keyserling families. The building plan indicates that, on the park side, two lateral wings and stairs leading to a veranda were intended. The façades were painted white, while the stone plinth and rusticated elements were left unplastered and grey. The reconstruction of the manor house was carried out no earlier than the 1830s, when the estate came into the possession of Wilhelm von Hahn and his wife Adelheid, because, inheritance documents from 1829 describe the manor house of Vilce Estate in its earlier appearance, featuring vaulted cellars, eleven rooms and a hall on the ground floor, six rooms in the attic storey, three chimneys, and tiled stoves in the rooms. A second floor was added to the building, and the main facade was given a wide fronton, with a clock placed at its centre. Beneath the windows in the hall, there were wooden panels with mouldings. Originally painted white, these panels were repainted in the late 19th century with a finish imitating wood grain. The walls were painted yellow and decorated with ornamental bands along their upper edge. Descriptions from the post-war period contain notes regarding parquet flooring in certain rooms, double-leaf oak doors, and wooden panelling beneath the windows. A separate basement was constructed beneath the veranda to provide heating for a winter garden. Restoration works on the manor house began only in the 1990s. From the 1920s onwards, when the building was adapted for use as a school, the interior finishes became increasingly simplified, and the layout was partly altered to accommodate classrooms.

== Manor complex ==
The earliest references to the Vilce Manor complex date to the early 19th century, when an inventory of the estate lists two dwelling houses for servants, two barns, stable, two cattle-sheds, ice cellar, drier, two sheds and the chapel of manor. On both sides of the manor house courtyard stood two dwelling houses of servants. Both were wooden buildings roofed with tiles. The 1829 inheritance documents of Vilce Manor also describe paper and flour watermills, which belonged to the earliest phase of the manor’s development. The mills were built in 1801 by Carl Dietrich von Medem and were located on the bank of the Vilce River. The mill complex, equipped with two water wheels, was a large stone masonry structure. The products of the Vilce paper mill were distinguished by watermarks featuring the von Medem coat of arms, the initials “CvM,” and a countermark bearing the inscription “WILTZEN” and the year of production. The inheritance documents also mention the manor tavern, a masonry building with a tiled roof, as well as a mill tavern. The largest part of maintenance buildings was built during the 19th century. Greenhouses, dwelling house of servants and stable were situated to the south from the courtyard. There is an orchard on the right side of the carriage-drive; large cattle-shed and cart-house were built on the opposite side. The threshing-house was built in 1809 to the north of the courtyard. The landscape park close to the manor house was made at the same time, when the house was rebuilt - in about the 30's -40's of the 19th century. The Vilce river draws a boundary of the park that extends in 7 hectares square.

== School ==
The first school for the children of Vilce and Blankenfeld was established in 1837 at Jaunmuiža. In 1850, a new school building was constructed in Silakurši. In 1868, the Vilce four-grade school became a six-grade school. Following the Latvian land reform in 1921, Vilce School was relocated to the manor house, and its first long-serving headmaster was Indriķis Bazons (1922–1939). In 1937, on the school’s 100th anniversary, Minister of the Interior Vilis Gulbis presented the school with a flag bearing the embroidered inscriptions “For Work. For Light. For the Fatherland” and “Vilce Six-Grade Primary School”. Throughout the years of Soviet rule, the flag was safeguarded by Elza Vibure, who, with the onset of the Latvian national awakening, returned it to the school. During the Second World War, in 1944, the manor house was occupied by soldiers of the Soviet Army.
