= William Bousie =

Anglo-French merchant (d. after 1787)

William Bousie (died after 1787), was an Anglo-French merchant. In 1776 Bousie met Count Cagliostro in London. In 1783-1787 Bousie was involved with the Universal and Theosophical Societies, served as a liaison between the Swedenborgians in London, Paris and Avignon. Bousie was in contact with the Illuminés of Avignon.
