= Christoph August Tiedge =

German poet

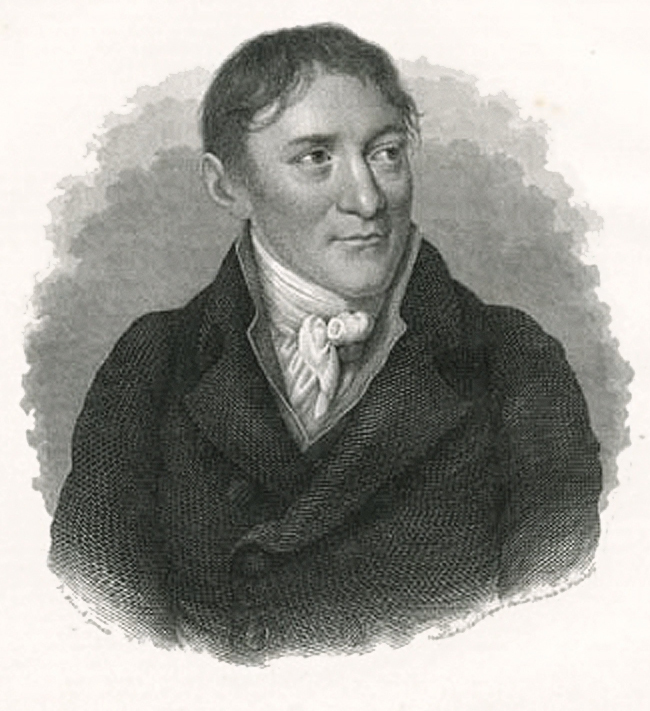
Christoph August Tiedge

Christoph August Tiedge (14 December 1752, Gardelegen – 8 March 1841, Dresden) was a German poet, who lived much of his life as a subject of the Holy Roman Empire.

== Biography ==
Tiedge was the eldest son of the rector of the Gelehrten Stadtschule in Gardelegen and his wife, and studied law in Halle, Holy Roman Empire. In 1788 he went to Halberstadt, acting for four years as secretary to the Domherr von Steder. After the Domherr died, Tiedge and his family moved to the vicinity of Quedlinburg. After the death of his wife, von Steder, in 1797, he alternated between living in Halle and Berlin and (from 1805 to 1808) accompanying his friend Elisa von der Recke through Germany, Switzerland and Italy. From 1819 Tiedge lived with Elisa in Dresden. Placed beyond material care by his friend's last will, he continued to live there after her death until his.

Some singable lyrics, of which "Schöne Minka, ich muss scheiden" is an example, first established his reputation, and Urania über Gott, Unsterblichkeit und Freiheit (1800; 18th ed., 1862), a lyric-didactic poem, inspired by the ethics of Emanuel Kant, enjoyed wide popularity in the beginning of the nineteenth century. A kind of sequel to it were the Wanderungen durch den Markt des Lebens (1833). Among his other poetical efforts, the Elegien und vermischte Gedichte (1803) met with the greatest success. After his death, the Tiedge Foundation was established in Dresden for the purpose of caring for the poet's grave and of granting subventions to poets and artists or their widows and children. Administered by the Saxon Ministry of Public Instruction, its funds amounted to more than 662,000 marks in 1901.

== Sources ==
- Gilman, D. C.; Peck, H. T.; Colby, F. M., eds. (1905). "Tiedge, Christoph August" . New International Encyclopedia (1st ed.). New York: Dodd, Mead. This work in turn cites:
  - Falkenstein, Tiedges Leben und poetischer Nachlass (Leipzig, 1841)
  - Eberhard, Blicke in Tiedges und Elisas Leben (Berlin, 1844)
  - Kern, Beiträge zu einer Charakteristik des Dichters Tiedge (Berlin, 1896)
