= Marc Bédarride =

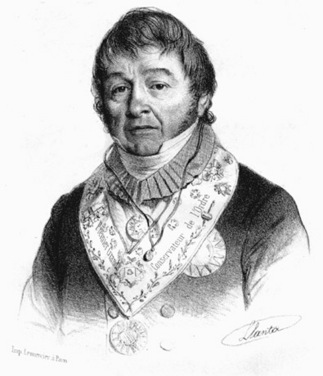
- Bédarride dressed in Rite of Misraim regalia from his 1845 work De l'ordre maçonnique de Misraïm
- Born: 4 February 1776; Cavaillon, Comtat Venaissin, Papal States
- Died: 1 May 1846 (aged 70)
- Military career
- Allegiance: First French Empire; Parthenopean Republic
- Branch: French Army
- Service years: 1798–180?
- Rank: Captain
- Commands: 18th "Les Emules de Mars" Line Battalion
- Conflicts: French Revolutionary Wars; Mediterranean campaign; War of the Second Coalition; Egyptian campaign; Battle of Marengo
- Other work: Freemason of the Rite of Misraim

Marc Bédarride (4 February 1776 – April 1846) was a French writer, military officer and Freemason. He served the French First Republic during the French Revolutionary Wars under Napoleon Bonaparte in Egypt and later in the Italian Peninsula. Although born in France, the conquests of the War of the Second Coalition brought him to the Italian Peninsula where his chief legacy was the founding of the masonic Rite of Misraim in 1813.

== Biography ==
=== Background ===
Bédarride came from a Sephardic Jewish family from Provence; the family took their name from Bédarrides where the family had lived for some time and had been familiar with Kabbalistic currents in Judaism there through the Dönmeh movement. Mardochée "Marc" Bédarride was born at Cavaillon, then part of Comtat Venaissin, Papal States on 4 February 1776 to Gad Bédarride (1740—25 December 1800) and Gentille Milhaud (1747—6 September 1831). He had two brothers; Jossuda "Joseph" Bédarride (1787–1840) and Michel Bédarride (29 August 1778 – 9 February 1856). Their father, Gad, became a freemason at Avignon in 1771.

=== Military ===
He served as part of Napoleon Bonaparte's Army as an officer during the French campaign in Egypt alongside Jean Poussielgue, Jean Baptiste Joseph Fourier, Bernardino Drovetti and Jean Baptiste Henraux. After returning to Europe from the Egypt campaign he arrived at Livorno in the Italian Peninsula. On 14 January 1799, he was appointed Captain of Staff of the Army of the Parthenopean Republic under the command of General Jean Étienne Championnet. He was commander of the 18th "Les Emules de Mars" Line Battalion at the Battle of Marengo.

=== Freemasonry ===
While serving in the French military, Bédarride became involved in Freemasonry. He was a scholar of Egyptology (something then very popular in France) and an honorary member of the Bonapartist Lodge of the Philosophical Scottish Rite "Saint Napoleon" of Palazzo Cocchi-Serristori in Florence. In 1801, he organized a meeting in Pisa of the most important Masonic lodges of the Kingdom of Etruria, together with Jacob Bédarride, Mathieu de Lesseps, the Consul General of France in Florence (and father of Ferdinand de Lesseps) and "Philalete Abraham" (perhaps Giulio Cesare Tassoni, Napoleonic diplomat).

In 1813 he founded in Naples the lodge "La Figlia della Sapienza" then directed in 1814 by the Grand Cofto General Lorenzo Montemayor (1768–1841) and historically linked to the lodge "I Figli della Libertà" which had been underground since 1799. He is remembered for having founded the Masonic "Rito Egizio di Misraim" in 1813 and, together with Jacob and Joseph, constituted the first Egyptian Rite of Paris on 19 May 1815, called Arc en Ciel (Arcobaleno), closely associated with the Italian and French circles of Filippo Buonarroti. The definitive structure of the Egyptian Rite of Misraim dates back to 1818, while in Brussels in 1819 it regulated the "Tegolatura Suprema Scala di Napoli", better known as "Arcana Arcanorum."

== Legacy ==
After his death, Bédarride's Rite of Misraim merged with the Rite of Memphis in 1880 under Giuseppe Garibaldi to become the Ancient and Primitive Rite of Memphis-Misraïm.

The Royal Masonic Cyclopaedia (1877) by Kenneth R. H. Mackenzie (author of the Cipher Manuscripts of the Hermetic Order of the Golden Dawn), considers the three Bédarride brothers; Marc, Michel and Joseph as "charlatans".

== See also ==
- Freemasonry in Italy
- Cagliostro
- Sabbateans
- Frankism

== Bibliography ==
- Marc Bédarride, De l'ordre maçonnique de Misraïm, Editions de Bénard, 1845.
- Gastone Ventura, I Riti Massonici di Misraim e Memphis, Atanor, Roma 1975
- Daniel Ligou, Dictionnaire de la Franc-Maçonnerie, Presses Universitaires de France, 1987.
- Gerard Galtier, Maçonnerie Egyptienne, Rose Croix et Neo-Chevalerie, Editions du Rocher, 1989.
- Franco Cristelli, Storia della Loggia Massonica "Napoleone" di Firenze, Centro Editoriale Toscano, 1992.
