= Graf Cagliostro =

Graf Cagliostro ('Count Cagliostro') is a comic opera in two acts by Mikael Tariverdiev, written in 1981 to a libretto by Nikolai Kemarsky, after the tale of the same name by Alexei Nikolayevich Tolstoy.

Tolstoy's novella, based on the quack Cagliostro, was updated by composer and librettist so that it impinges on the modern world, (and uses modern musical style). Tariverdiev wrote:

In writing 'Graf Cagliostro' I wanted to create a brand new genre of comic opera. I decided to return to the standard voices and traditional forms of opera buffa, with arias, secco recitative, developed in lively acts - but, of course, in a contemporary way.

== Roles ==
Role	Voice type	Premiere Cast (Conductor: - )
Praskovia Petrovna	soprano	
Cagliostro	baritone	
Alexei	tenor	
Maria	soprano	
Jan Lozhkin	tenor	
Four generals	baritone and bass	
Chorus of tourists, etc.		

== Recording ==
- Moscow Chamber Theatre, conducted by Vladimir Agronsky. Bomba Music, Russia 2003 (2 CDs)
