= Cage =

Enclosure used to confine, contain or protect something or someone

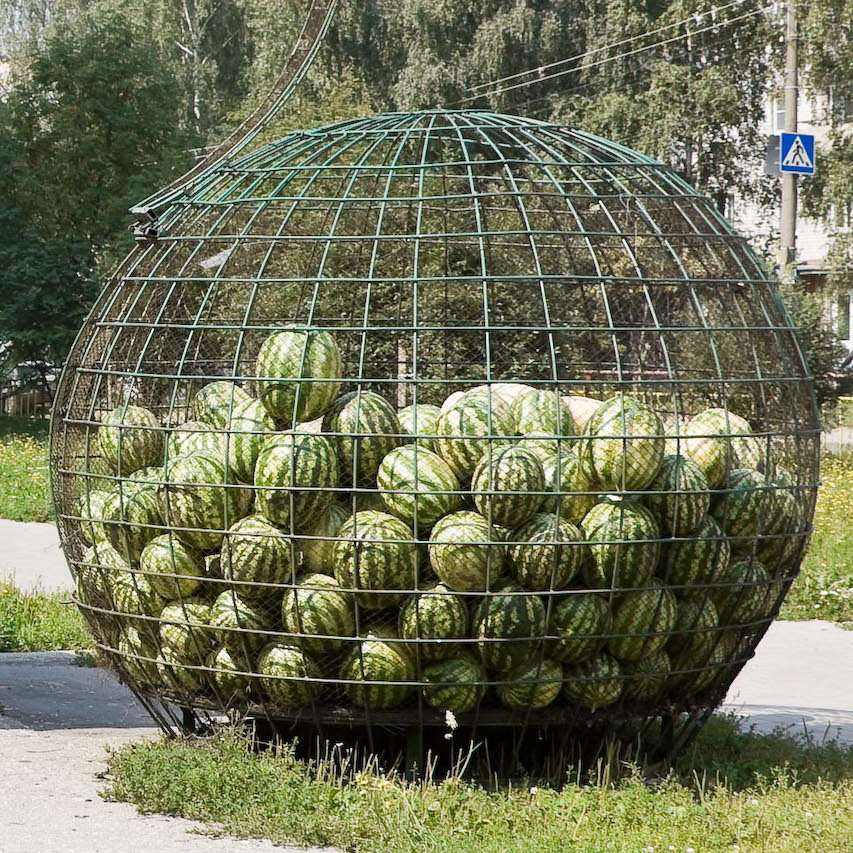
Spherical cage containing watermelons in Russia

A cage is an enclosure often made of mesh, bars, or wires, used to confine, contain or protect something or someone. A cage can serve many purposes, including keeping an animal or person in captivity, capturing an animal or person, displaying an animal at a zoo, or protecting an object from external threats (i.e. theft, damage).

== Construction ==
Since a cage is usually intended to hold living beings, at least some part of its structure must be such as to allow for the entry of light and air. Thus, some cages may be made with bars spaced closely together for the intended captive to slip between them, or with windows covered by a mesh of some sort.

Though cages may be commonly made of steel, their construction and design vary with the inclusion of other materials; for instance, a cage may be mainly built using wooden rods secured in place by using steel wire or even twine.

== Animal cages ==
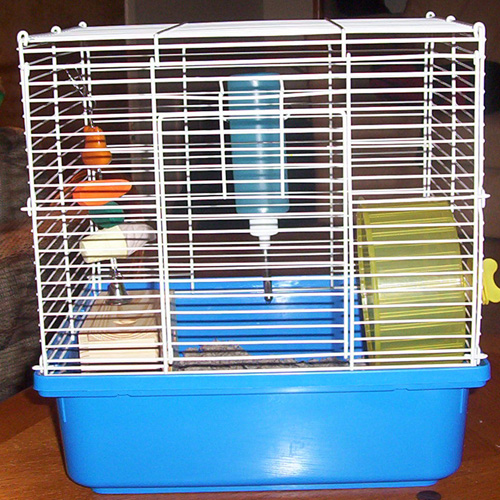
A cage designed to contain small animals

Cages often used to confine animals, and some are specially designed to fit a certain species of animal. One or more birds, rodents, reptiles, and even larger animals of certain breeds are sometimes confined in a cage as pets.

Animal cages have been a part of human culture since ancient times. For example, an Ancient Greek vase dated to 490 B.C. depicts a boy holding a possibly domesticated rabbit on his lap, with a cage with an open door in the background. The biblical Book of Jeremiah refers to a tribe being like "cages full of birds", and the Book of Ezekiel describes the capture of a lion in which the captors "pulled him into a cage and brought him to the king of Babylon".

The different laws governing the keeping of animals in captivity generally provide for the size of cages or minimum equipment, depending on the species, whether for transport or for breeding. Swiss legislation, for example, defines minimum absolute internal dimensions for pet cages, but the Swiss Animal Protection organization (PSA) states that even if these dimensions comply with the law, they are far from being in line with the needs of species. It is therefore necessary in practice to provide a much higher vital space to ensure the well-being of the occupants.

Animal protection associations have often argued for improving transport conditions in cages and for bans on battery cages, especially for egg-laying hens. The European legislation is constantly changing, but consumer behavior also influences breeding conditions.

=== Trapping ===
Cages also serve as a trapping tool. This is a common and illegal purpose of the cage, as poaching is illegal itself. These types of cages are used to trap an animal, or hold them for a certain period of time. U.S. President Theodore Roosevelt used a cage himself to capture a bear, as the cage serves a purpose for capturing large animals.

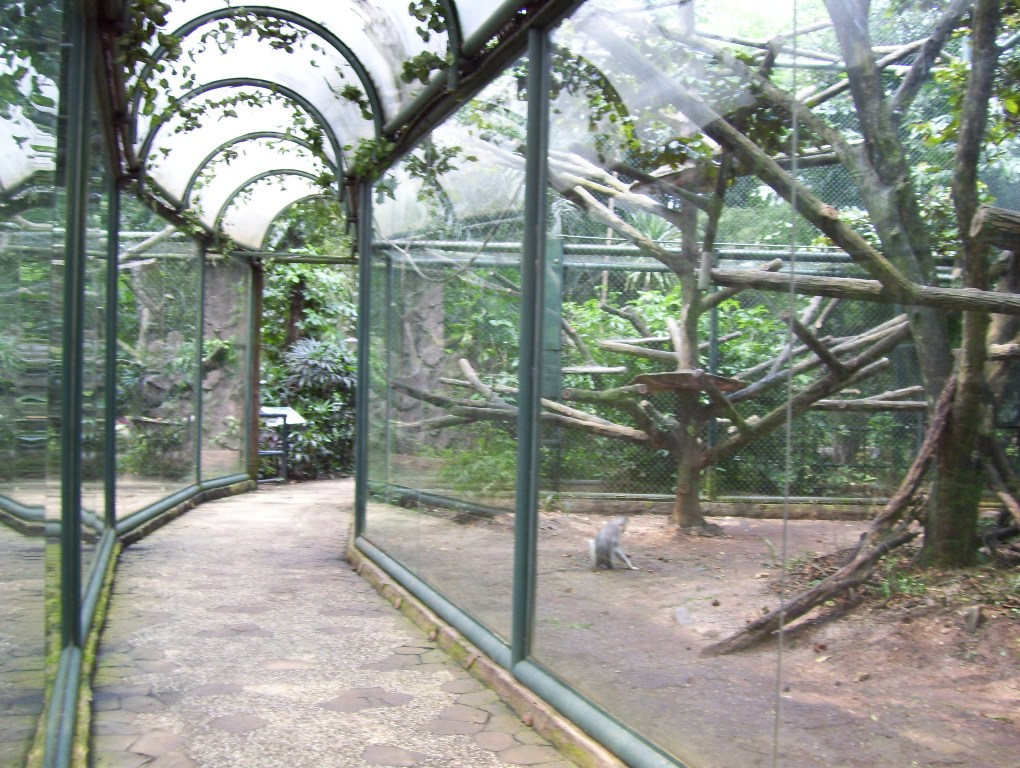
Zoo cage

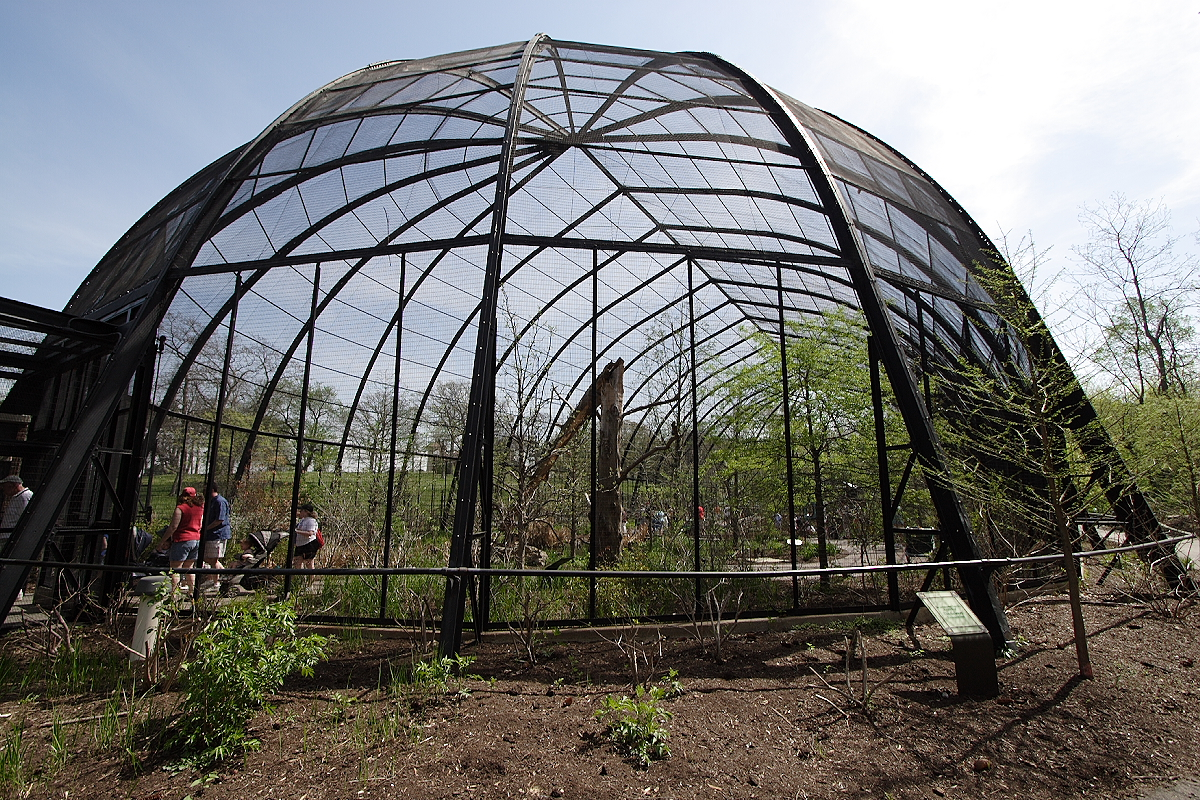
Aviary

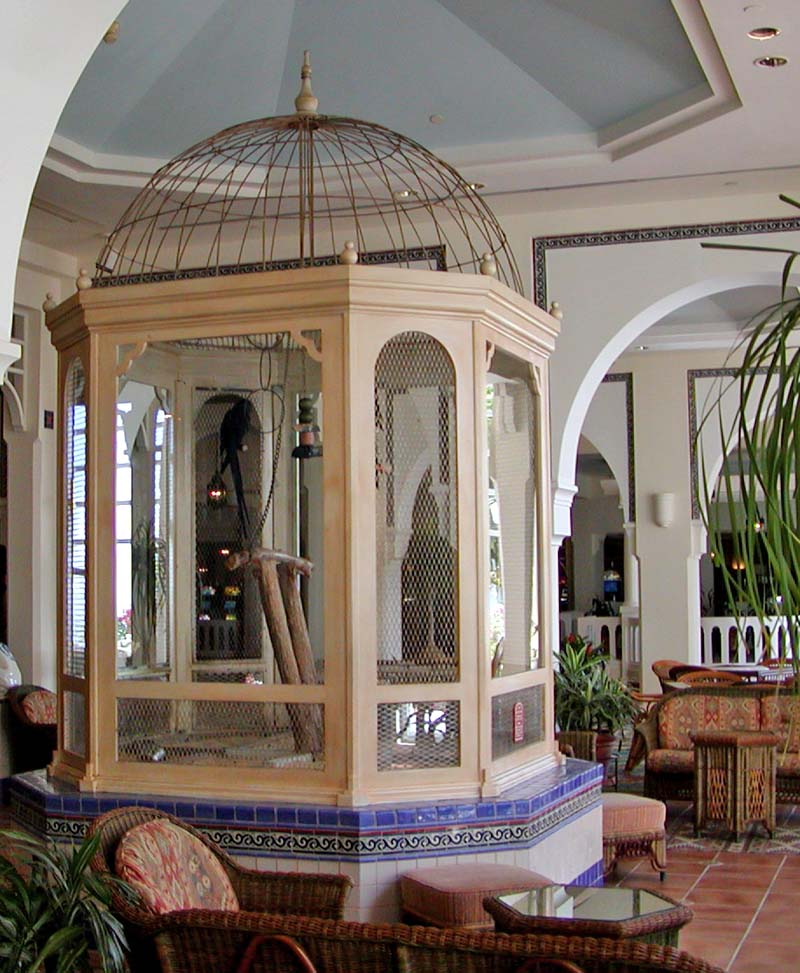
Decorative aviary

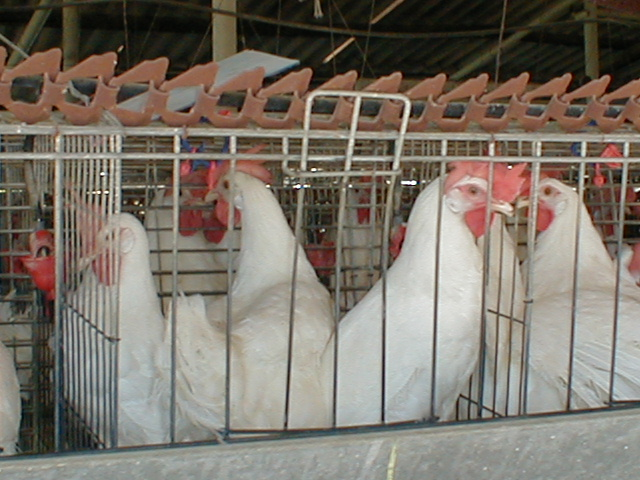
Battery cage

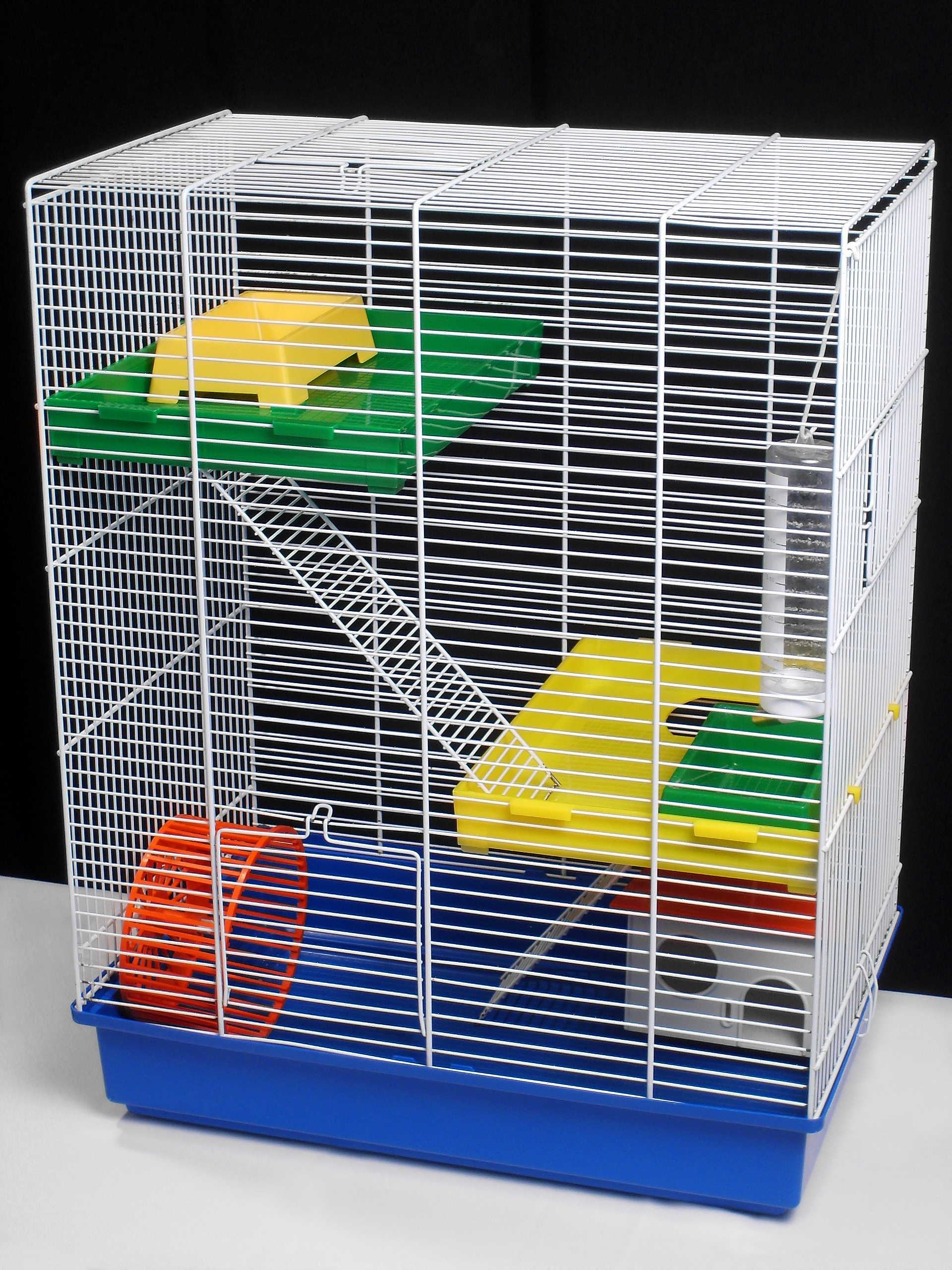
Hamster or mouse cage

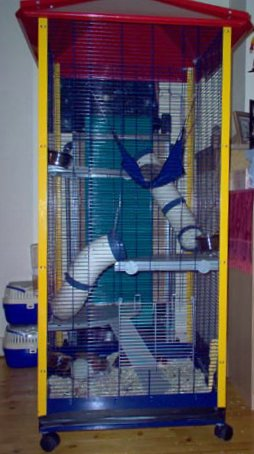
Rat cage

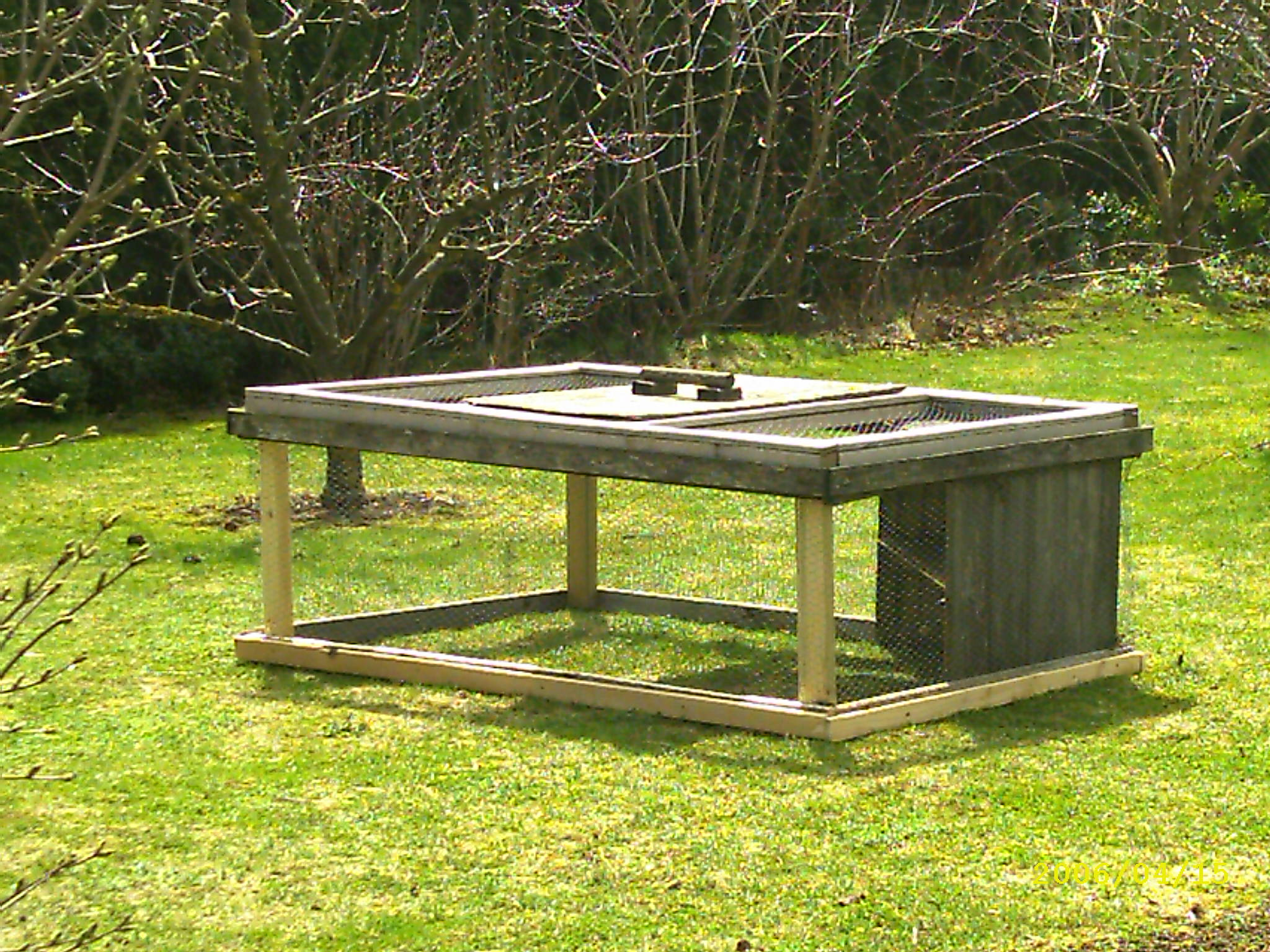
Rabbit cage

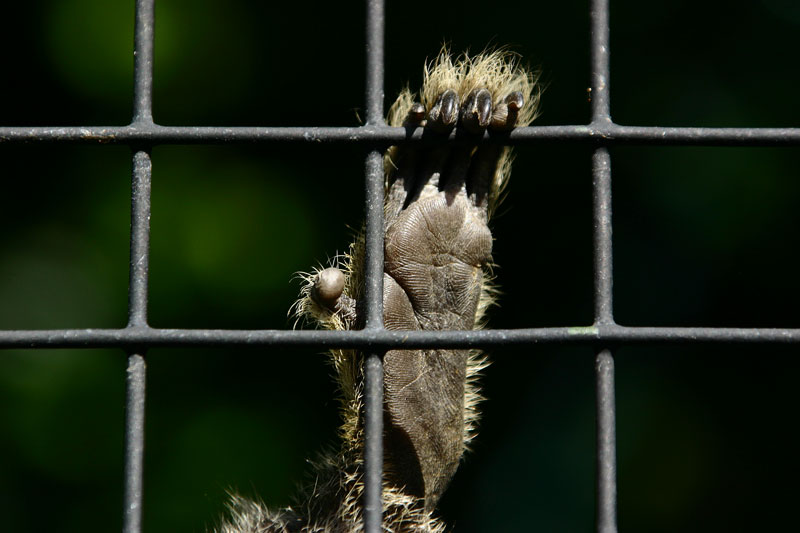
The hand of a marmoset caged at a butterfly park

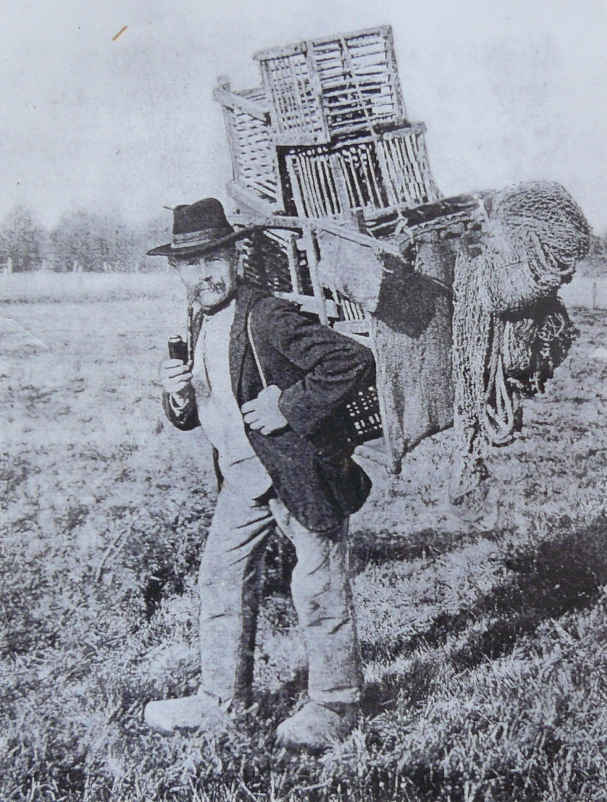
Cage of bird trapper (late 19th century)

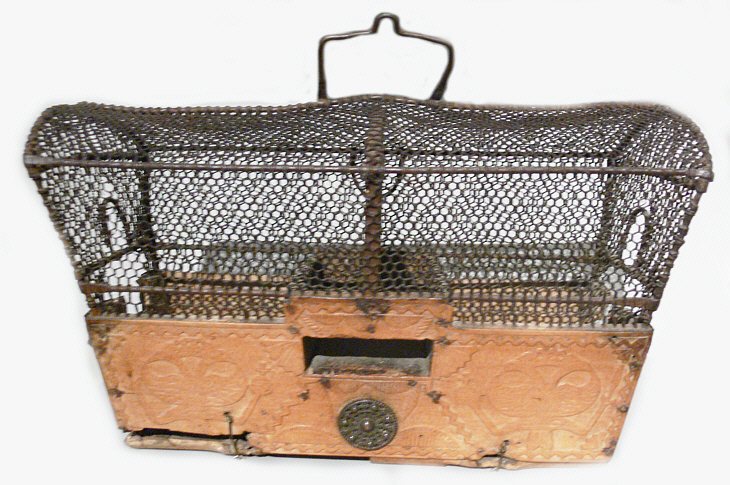
Birdcage (18th / 19th century)

== Human cages ==
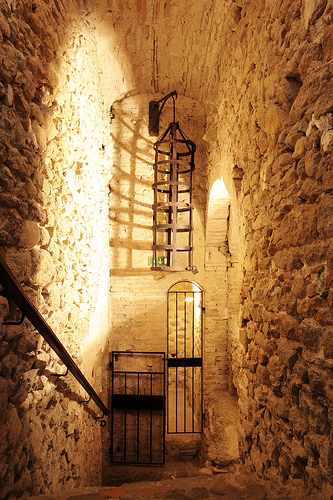
Gibbet at Forte di San Leo

=== Punishment ===
Cage and cage-like enclosures have historically been used for imprisonment, punishment and the public display of prisoners or executed criminals. In England and Wales, gibbeting, or "hanging in chains", involved displaying the body of an executed offender in an iron cage or framework. The practice predates the Murder Act 1752, which made post-mortem punishment mandatory for certain convicted murders, and remained in use until its abolition in 1834.

During the Vietnam War, prisoners held at the Côn Sơn prison complex in South Vietnam were confined in small cells known as "tiger cages". The use of these enclosures received international attention in 1970 after a United States congressional delegation documented conditions at the prison. Prisoners were sometimes restrained in painful positions while confined in cages. In medieval England, King Edward punished Robert the Bruce by having two of his female supporters encaged in public.

=== Safety ===
- Safety cage, in automobile safety
  - Roll cage, a frame built in or around the cab of a vehicle
- Shark-proof cage, used to protect divers

=== Entertainment ===
Cages are used in various forms of entertainment to create excitement from the sense that the entertainers are trapped in the cage. For example, cage dancing "refers to a scantily-clad feminine dancer, perhaps wearing a mini-skirt or hot- pants, and (supposedly) trapped inside of a hanging bird cage". Cage fighting involves two combatants, usually engaging in mixed martial arts, inside a cage-like structure, and "conjures up the image of two combatants trapped in a cage, trading vicious blows as the audience bays for blood". In Australia, a ban on the use of "cage-like enclosures" at such events was lifted in 2014. Steel cages are also one of the oldest form of enclosures used in professional wrestling. The first "steel cage match" of any kind took place on June 25, 1937 in Atlanta, Georgia. This match took place in a ring surrounded by chicken wire, in order to keep the athletes inside, and prevent any potential interference. Similarly speaking, the early history of basketball leagues would utilize wire cages for the basketball players to compete in a rougher manner than what would be found in the present-day era of the sport.

=== Homes ===
A metal-mesh storage cage beneath the 8th Avenue Viaduct in Denver, Colorado.

== Engineering ==
- Rebar cages used in reinforced concrete
- Cage (bearing) – a component of a rolling-element bearing
- Gabion – a cage filled with coarse gravel or rock for use in civil engineering, road building, military applications and landscaping
- Mine cage – similar to an elevator, for a shaft mine
- Cage, a separated enclosure in a computer colocation centre
- Faraday cage – an enclosure used to block electric fields

== Other uses ==
- Batting cage – an enclosure for baseball batting practice
- Bottle cage – a bicycle bottle holder
- Cage crinoline – a type of crinoline petticoat
- Cage trolley - used for transporting goods
- Fruit cage - used to protect fruit bushes from been eaten by birds
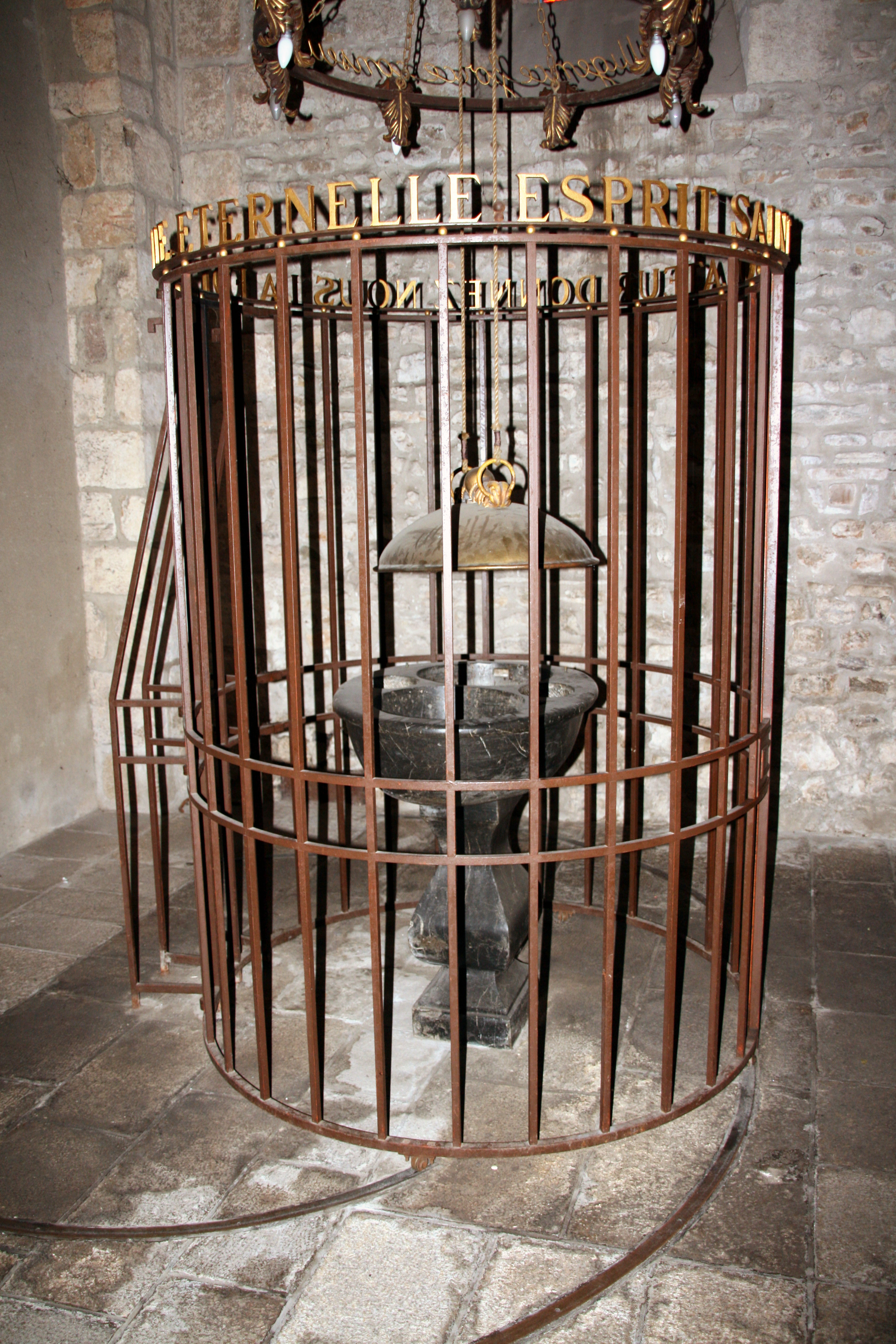
Cage protecting a baptismal font

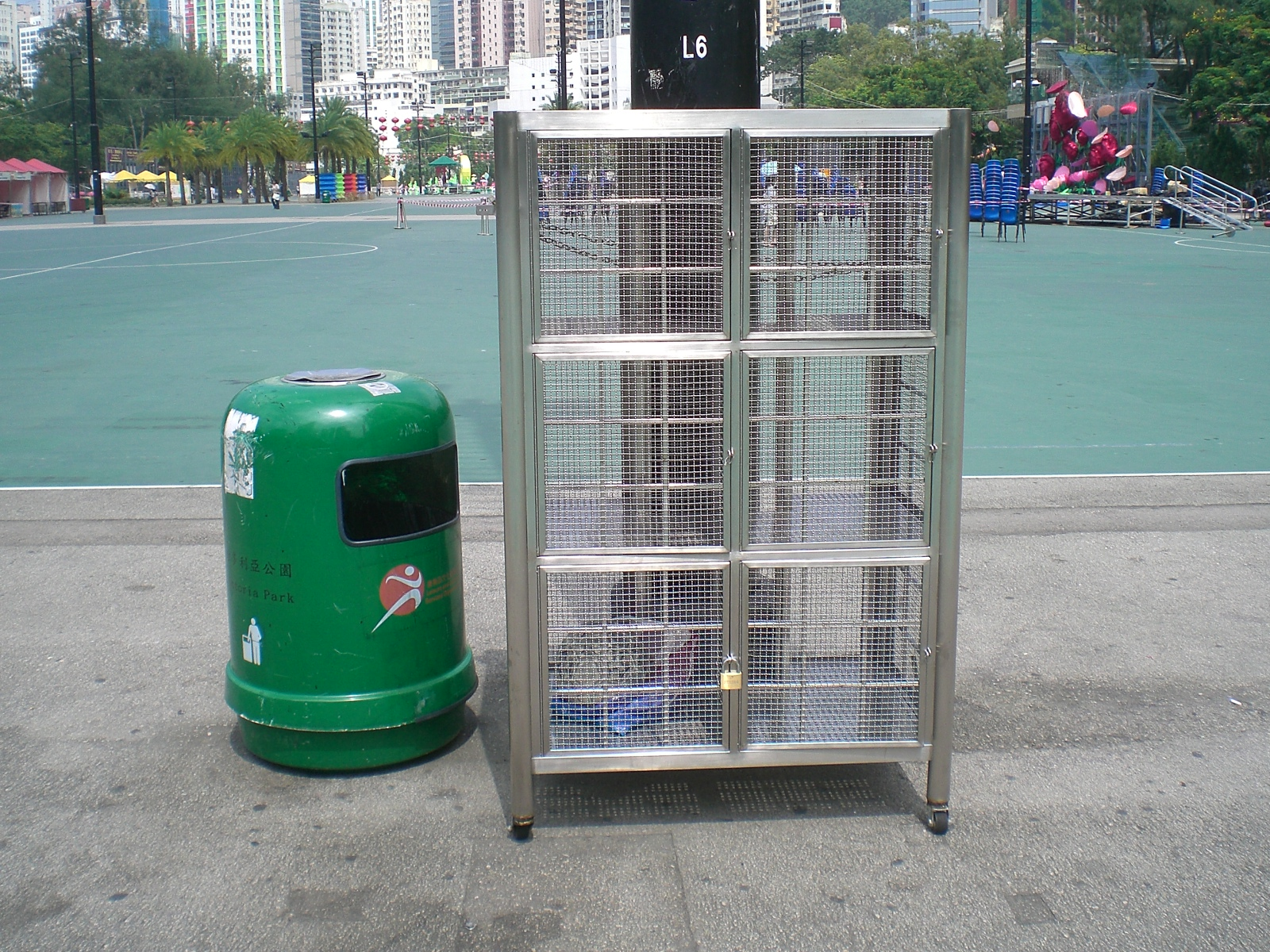
Locker cages in Hong Kong

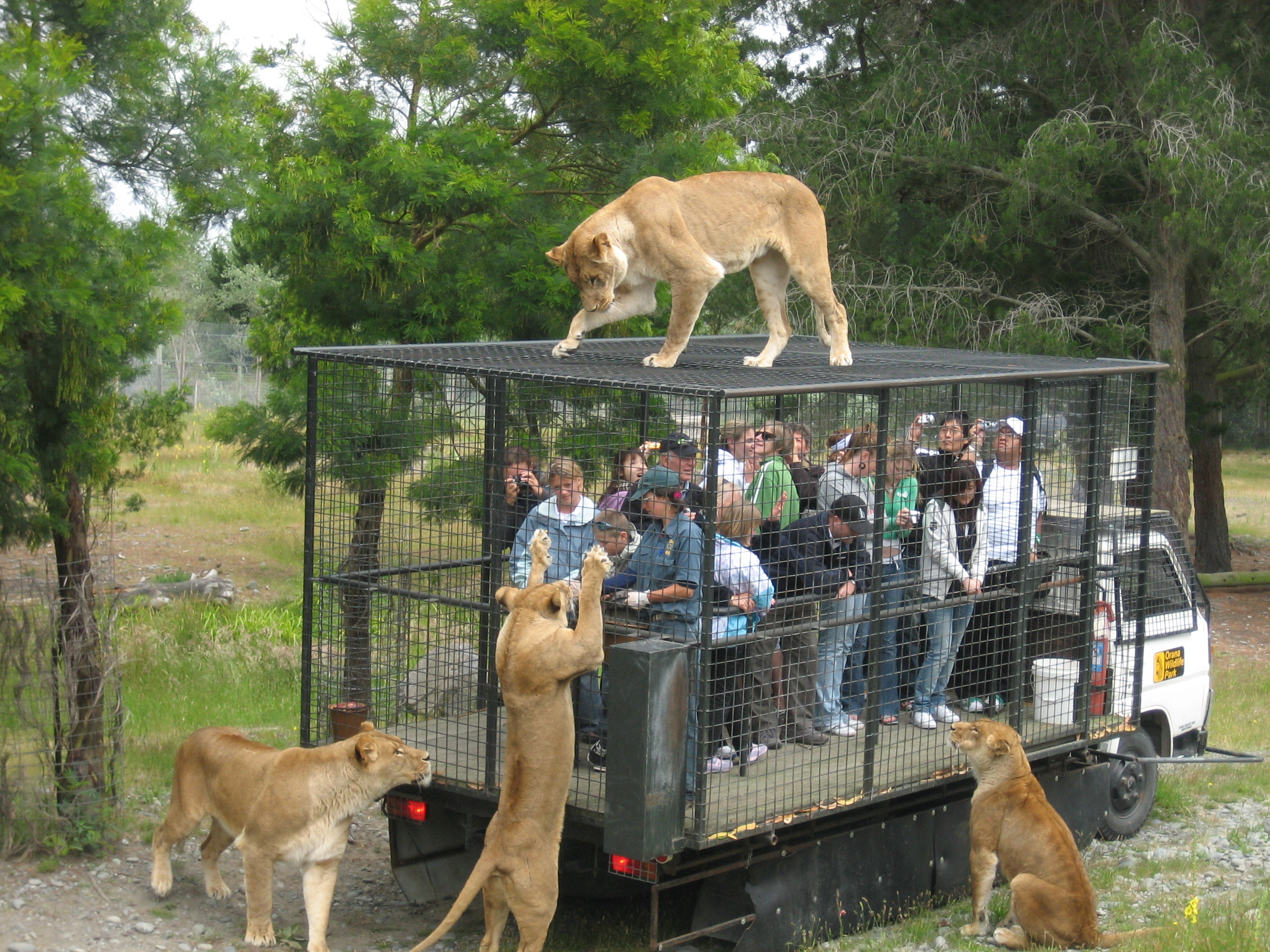
Protection cage

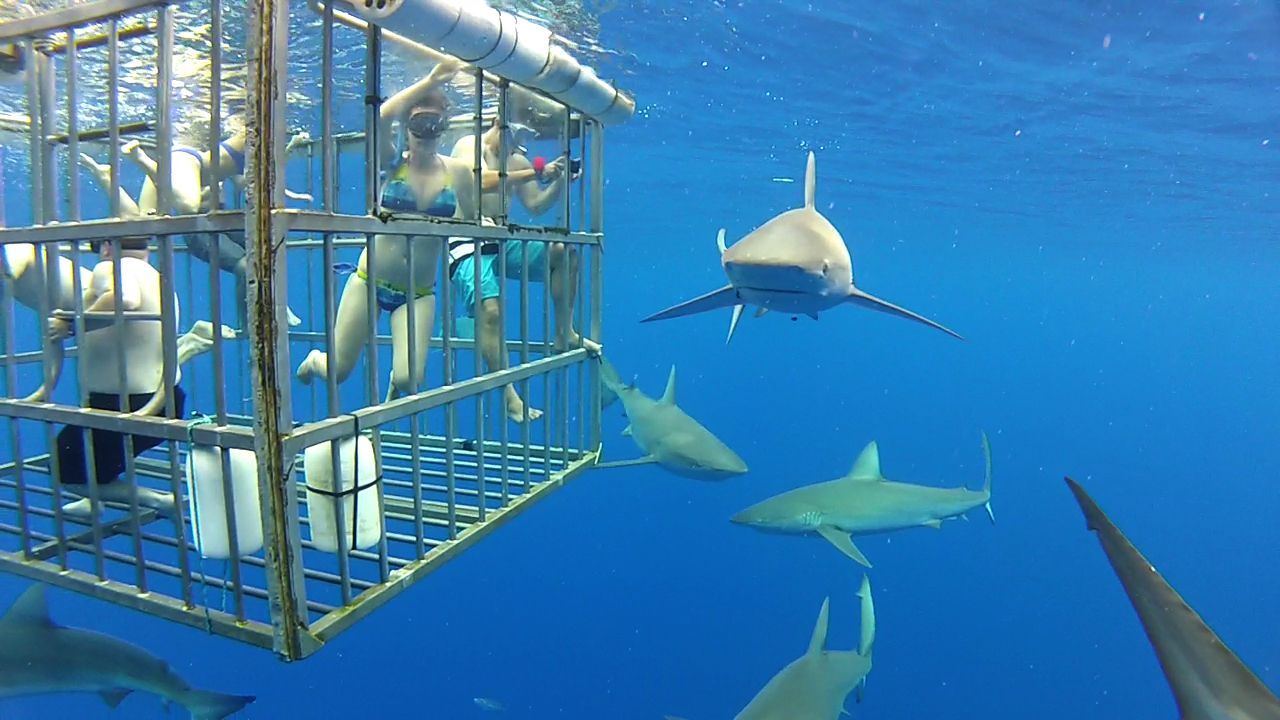
Sharks around a shark cage being used for shark tourism

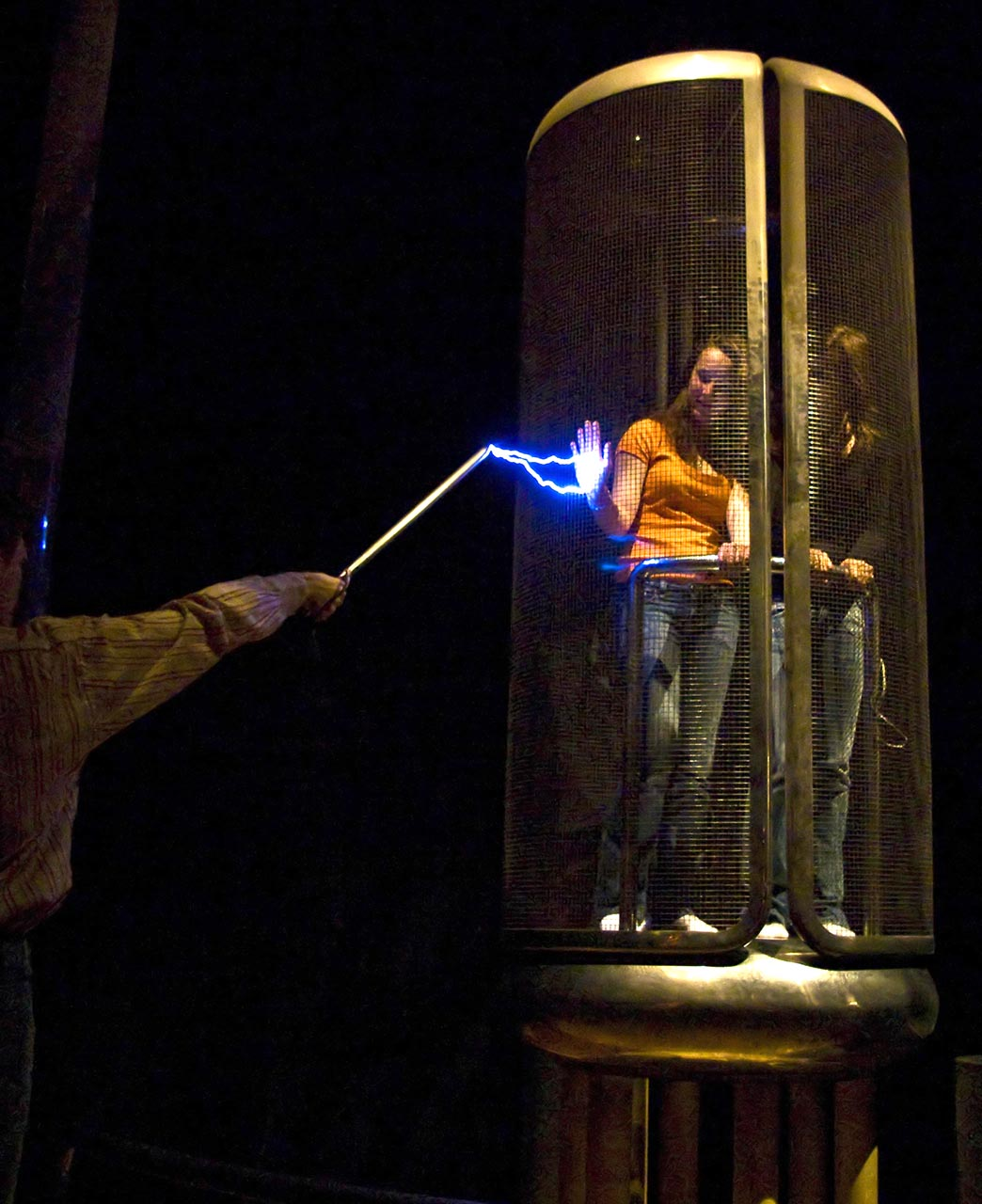
Faraday cage

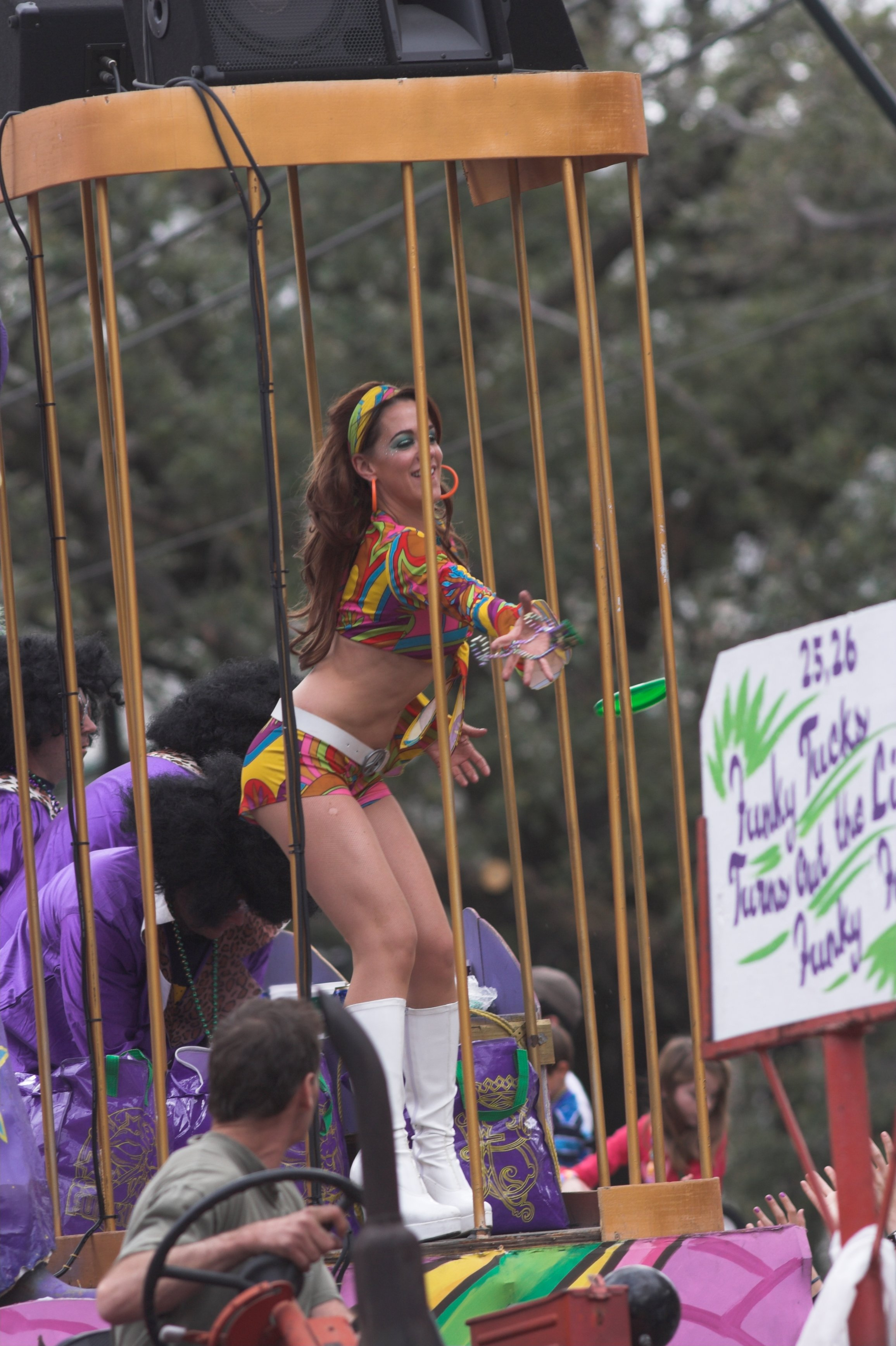
Go-go dancing cage

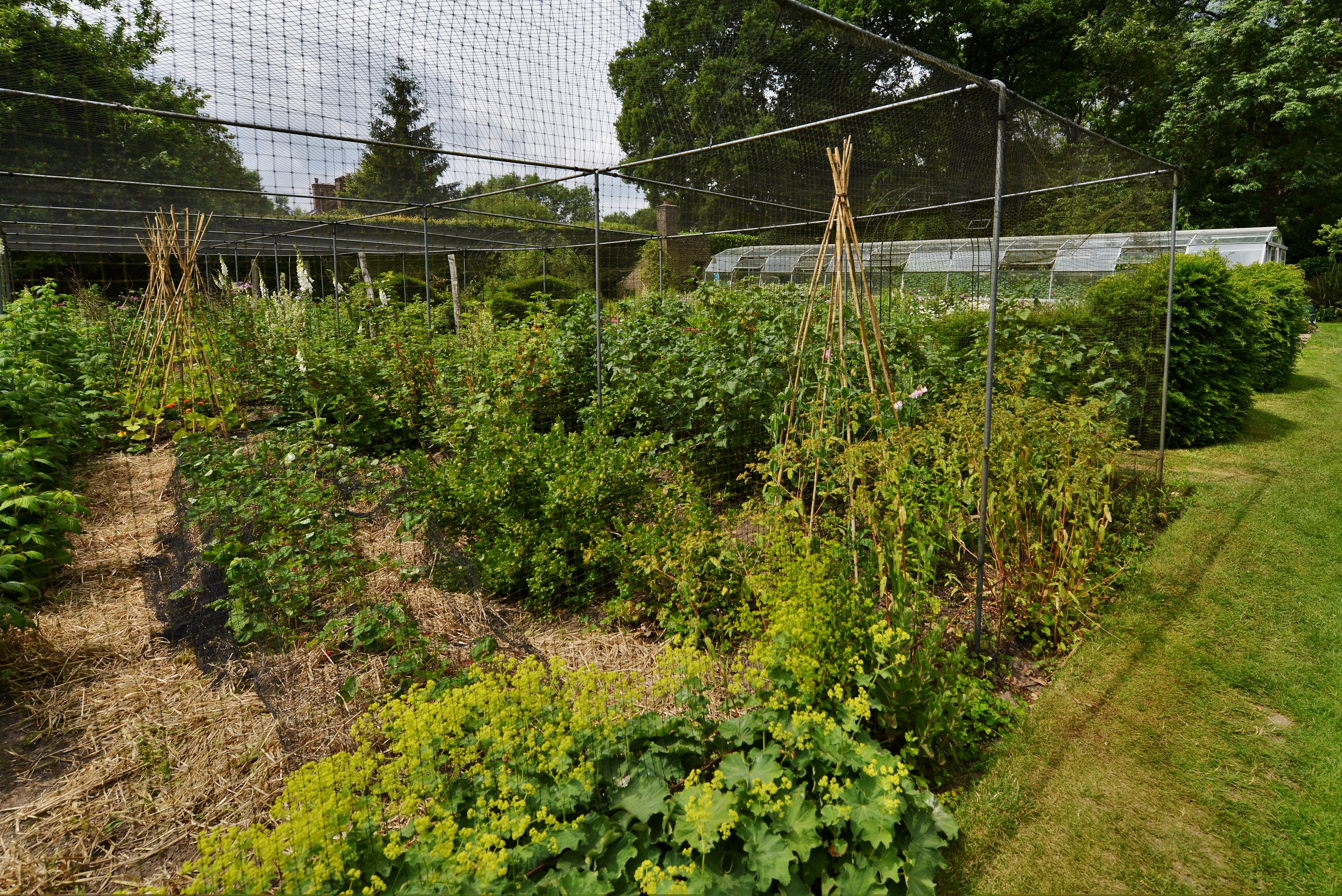
Soft fruit cages

== See also ==
- Aquarium
- Box
- Formicarium
- Gestation crate
- Iron maiden – an iron cabinet putative torture device
- Locker
- Jungle gym – inspired by monkeys shaking the bars of a cage
- Pen (enclosure)
- Terrarium
- Vivarium
