= Elisa von der Recke =

Baltic German writer and poet (1754–1833)

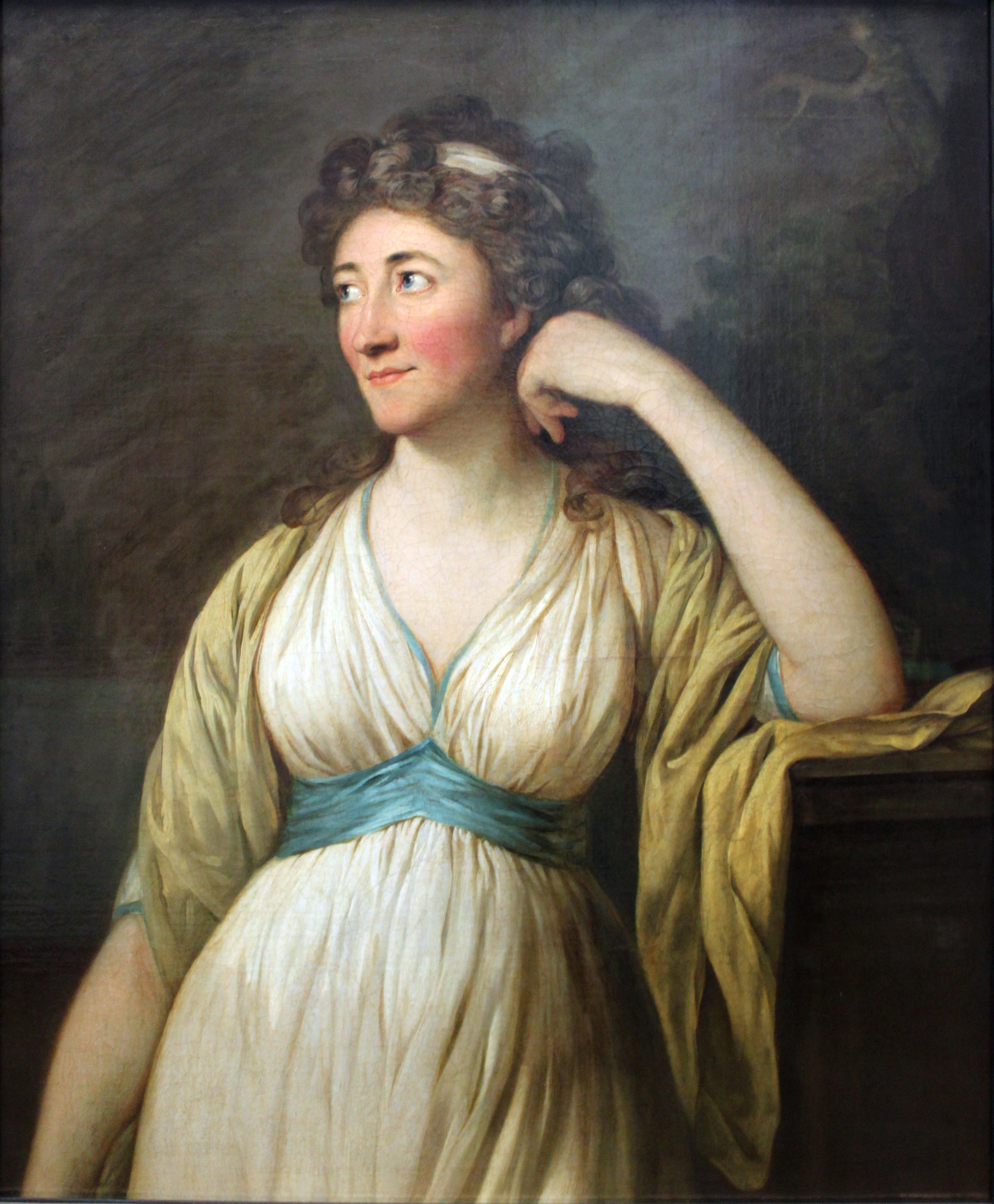
- Portrait by Anton Graff, 1797
- Born: 20 May 1754; Schönberg, Duchy of Courland and Semigallia (present-day Skaistkalne, Latvia)
- Died: 13 April 1833 (aged 78); Dresden, Kingdom of Saxony, German Confederation
- Occupations: Writer; poet
- Spouse: Georg Peter Magnus von der Recke (m. 1771; div. 1781)
- Partner: Christoph August Tiedge (from 1804)
- Children: 1 (died in infancy)
- Parent(s): Johann Friedrich von Medem (father); Louise Dorothea von Korff (mother)
- Relatives: Dorothea von Medem (half-sister)

Elisabeth "Elisa" Charlotte Constanzia von der Recke (née von Medem; 20 May 1754 – 13 April 1833) was a Baltic German writer, poet, and memoirist. She is best known for her exposé of the occultist Alessandro Cagliostro, which made her famous across Europe and earned her the gratitude of Catherine the Great. Her writings reflect the tension between rational and mystical religious views during the late Enlightenment era.

== Early life and family ==
Elisa von der Recke was born in Schönberg, Skaistkalne parish, in the Duchy of Courland and Semigallia (present-day Latvia). She was the daughter of Graf (later Reichsgraf) Johann Friedrich von Medem (1722–1785) and his first wife, Louise Dorothea von Korff (1736–1757). After her mother's early death, Elisa received a limited education in her grandmother's household, where she was forbidden to read books. Her stepmother, Agnes Elisabeth von Brukken (1718–1784), later helped provide her with a general education.

Her younger half-sister was Dorothea von Medem, who became Duchess of Courland. Elisa later carried out diplomatic work on her sister's behalf after the Duchy was annexed by the Russian Empire in 1795.

In 1771, she married Kammerherr Georg Peter Magnus von der Recke (1739–1795) for reasons of social standing, living with him at Neuenburg Castle (now Jaunpils Castle). The marriage was an unhappy one; she separated from him in 1776 and they divorced in 1781. Their only daughter, Frederika, died in 1777.

== Life ==
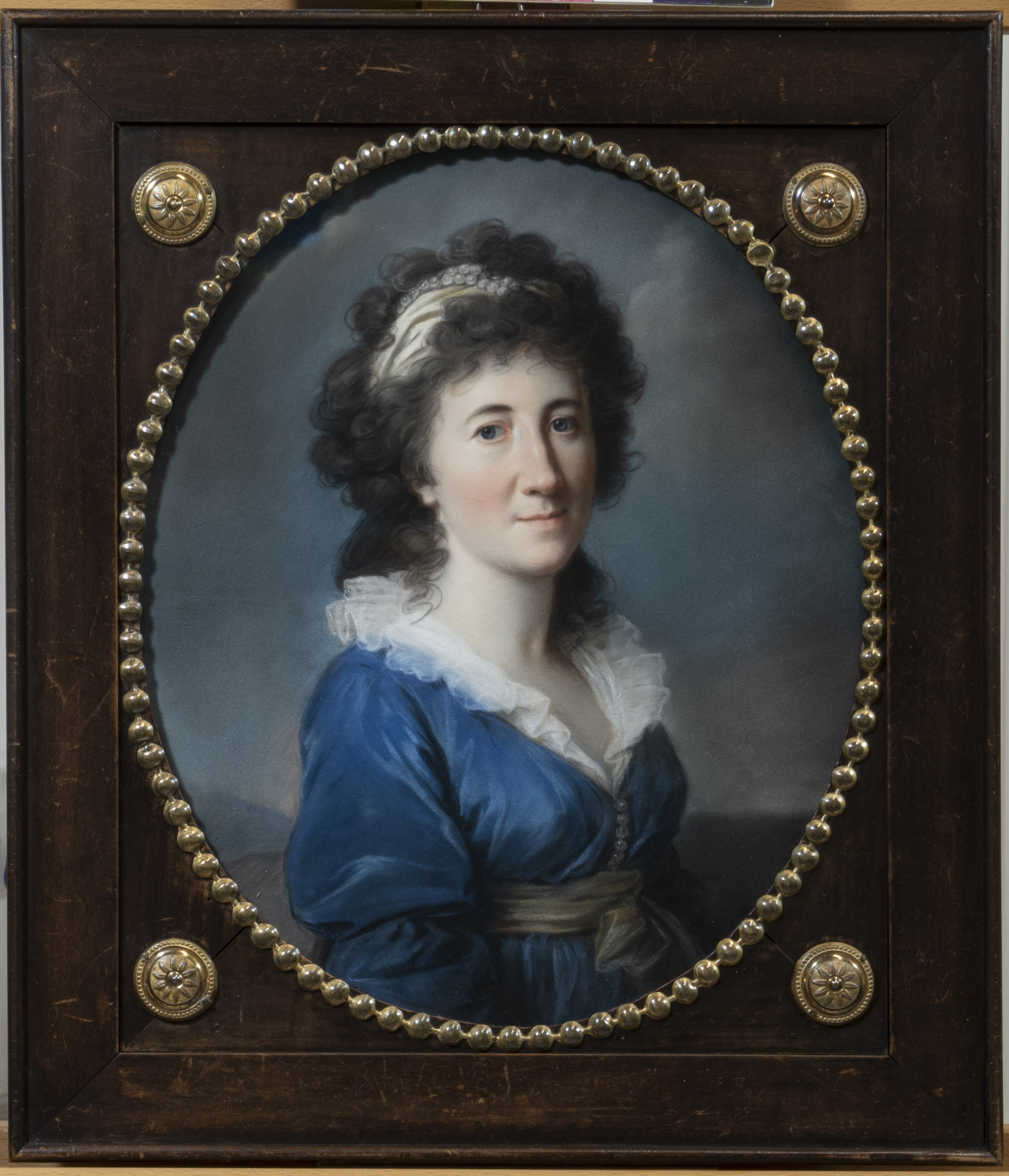
Portrait of Elisa von der Recke (née von Medem), pastel attributed to Johann Heinrich Schröder, 1799/1800. Collection of the Rundāle Palace Museum. Photo: Ints Lūsis.

== Encounter with Cagliostro and literary fame ==
In 1779, while living in Mitau (now Jelgava, Latvia), von der Recke became involved with the notorious occultist "Count" Alessandro Cagliostro. She and her female relatives participated in "Egyptian Freemasonry" ceremonies led by Cagliostro's wife, Seraphina. However, von der Recke eventually became disillusioned with Cagliostro's claims and his amorous advances toward her.

In 1787, she published her first book, Nachricht von des berüchtigten Cagliostro Aufenthalt in Mitau im Jahre 1779 und dessen magischen Operationen (Account of the Notorious Cagliostro's Stay in Mitau in 1779 and His Magical Operations), a memoir and exposé that detailed his deceptions and charlatanism. The book caused a sensation across educated Europe. Catherine the Great of Russia, who was skeptical of Cagliostro, granted von der Recke the revenues from the domain of Pfalzgrafen near Mitau in recognition of her work, making her financially independent.

The Russian poet and diplomat Wilhelm Küchelbecker later described her as follows:

"Elise von der Recke, born Countess Medem, a majestic, tall woman, she was once one of the first beauties in Europe; now, in her sixty-fifth year of life, Elise still captivates with her kindness, her intelligence, her imagination – von der Recke was a friend of the most illustrious persons who immortalised the last years of Catherine's century: the great empress respected and loved her, especially because she hated the ruinous superstition which Cagliostro and similar deceivers began to spread."

== Literary and intellectual network ==
Throughout her life, von der Recke traveled extensively across Europe to meet the leading intellectual figures of her time. She established friendships and maintained prolific correspondence with many prominent writers and thinkers, including Johann Wolfgang von Goethe, Friedrich Schiller, Christoph Martin Wieland, Johann Gottfried Herder, Friedrich Gottlieb Klopstock, Matthias Claudius, Johann Bernhard Basedow, Immanuel Kant, Johann Georg Hamann, Carl Philipp Emanuel Bach, and Friedrich Ludwig Schröder.

She also maintained friendships with the painters Anton Graff and Johann Heinrich Wilhelm Tischbein, who created portraits of her. Graff painted her portrait in 1797, which now hangs in the Alte Nationalgalerie in Berlin.

== Later life in Dresden ==
From 1798, von der Recke lived almost exclusively in Dresden, Kingdom of Saxony. In 1804, she began cohabiting with her long-time friend and fellow author, Christoph August Tiedge (1752–1841), who wrote the poetic-philosophical work Urania. Their household became a center of religious-sentimentalist culture, where they sang chorales by Johann Gottlieb Naumann and hosted literary gatherings.

From 1804 to 1806, she traveled through Italy with Tiedge, spending time in Rome where she met the Danish sculptor Bertel Thorvaldsen, who created marble portrait busts of her (now in the Thorvaldsen Museum).

Throughout her life, von der Recke cared for thirteen foster daughters. She was also the godmother of Theodor Körner, the German poet and patriot.

== Death and burial ==
Elisa von der Recke died in Dresden on 13 April 1833 at the age of 78. She is buried at the Innerer Neustädter Friedhof (Inner Neustadt Cemetery) in Dresden, alongside her long-time companion Christoph August Tiedge.

== Masonic and esoteric associations ==
Von der Recke is recognized in the history of Freemasonry as one of the notable women associated with the fraternity during the 18th century. Her involvement with Cagliostro's "Egyptian Freemasonry" ceremonies in Mitau in 1779 represents an early instance of women's participation in Masonic-style esoteric rituals. However, her later exposé of Cagliostro established her as a critic of occult charlatanism within Enlightenment intellectual circles.

== Writings ==
Von der Recke's works consist mainly of pietist-sentimentalist poems, journals, and memoirs.[citation:1] Her religious writings demonstrate the tension between rational and mystical views of religion characteristic of the late Enlightenment.[citation:5] The loss of loved ones in her early life initially made her sympathetic to concepts such as magic and spirit communication, but after reading the works of Lessing and other Enlightenment philosophers, she became devoted to rational religious ideals.[citation:5]

=== Selected works ===
- Nachricht von des berüchtigten Cagliostro Aufenthalt in Mitau im Jahre 1779 und dessen magischen Operationen (1787) – her most famous work, an exposé of Cagliostro
- Leben des Grafen Johann Friedrich von Medem nebst seinem Briefwechsel hauptsächlich mit der Frau Kammerherrinn von der Recke, seiner Schwester (1792, edited by Johann Lorenz Blessig)
- Familien=Scenen oder Entwickelungen auf dem Masquenballe (c. 1794, published 1826)
- Über Naumann, den guten Menschen und großen Künstler (article in Neuen Deutschen Merkur, 1803)

=== Published posthumously ===
- Geistliche Lieder, Gebete und religiöse Betrachtungen (Leipzig: Teubner, 1841)
- Elisa von der Recke. Band 1. Aufzeichnungen und Briefe aus ihren Jugendtagen (1902, edited by Paul Rachel)
- Elisa von der Recke. Band 2. Tagebücher und Briefe aus ihren Wanderjahren (1902, edited by Paul Rachel)
- Herzensgeschichten einer baltischen Edelfrau. Erinnerungen und Briefe (Stuttgart: Lutz, 1921)
- Tagebücher und Selbstzeugnisse (1984, edited by Christine Träger; ISBN 3-406-30196-7)

== Legacy ==
Von der Recke is remembered as a significant figure of the German Enlightenment, particularly for her role in exposing Cagliostro's deceptions and for her extensive literary network across Europe. Her writings and correspondence provide valuable insight into the intellectual and cultural life of the late 18th and early 19th centuries.

The Riga Museum of World Freemasonry includes von der Recke among "Eight Women" who made significant contributions to the history of women in Freemasonry. A 2013 thesis from Brigham Young University examined her religious writings within the context of Enlightenment-era debates between rational and mystical approaches to religion.

== See also ==
- Alessandro Cagliostro
- Age of Enlightenment
- Baltic German literature
- Christoph August Tiedge

== Sources ==
- "Рекке, Елизавета Шарлота" . Brockhaus and Efron Encyclopedic Dictionary (in Russian). 1906.
- Michelle S. James and Rob McFarland: "Collaborating with Spirits: Cagliostro, Elisa von der Recke, and the Phantoms of Unmündigkeit" in Laura Deiulio and John Lyon (Eds.) Gender, Collaboration, and Authorship in German Culture: Literary Joint Ventures 1750-1850, New York: Bloomsbury, 2019. 101-138.
- James, Michelle S.; McFarland, Rob (2019). "Collaborating with Spirits: Cagliostro, Elisa von der Recke, and the Phantoms of Unmündigkeit". Gender, Collaboration, and Authorship in German Culture: Literary Joint Ventures 1750-1850. New York: Bloomsbury. pp. 101–138.
- Leyh, Valérie; Müller, Adelheid; Viehöver, Vera (2018). Elisa von der Recke: Aufklärerische Kontexte und lebensweltliche Perspektiven. Germanisch-romanische Monatsschrift. Vol. 90. Heidelberg: Universitätsverlag Winter. ISBN 978-3-8253-6904-0.
- Müller, Adelheid (2012). Sehnsucht nach Wissen: Friederike Brun, Elisa von der Recke und die Altertumskunde um 1800. Berlin: Reimer. ISBN 978-3-496-01471-3.
- Enlightened Ecstasy: The Poetry and Writings of Elisa Von Der Recke. Brigham Young University. 2013.
