= Alessandro Cagliostro =

Italian occultist (1743–1795)

Count Alessandro Cagliostro
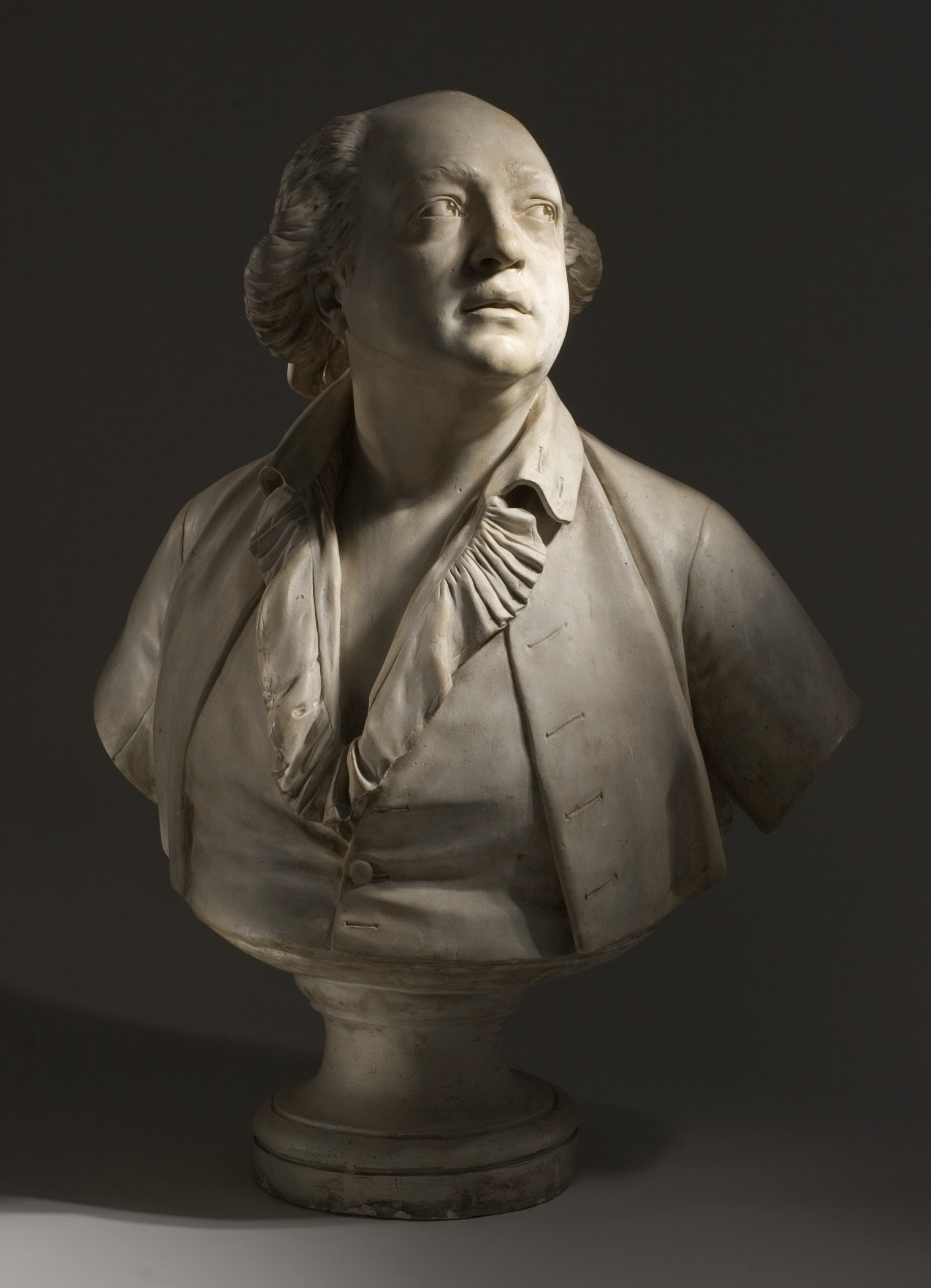
- Bust by Jean-Antoine Houdon, c. 1786
- Born: Giuseppe Balsamo; 8 June 1743; Albergheria, Palermo, Kingdom of Sicily
- Died: 26 August 1795 (aged 52); Forte di San Leo, Papal States
- Other names: Beppo Balsamo; Joseph Balsamo; Joseph Cagliostro
- Occupations: Occultist; adventurer; magician; confidence trickster

Giuseppe Balsamo (Note: Italian pronunciation: [dʒuˈzɛppe ˈbalsamo].) (2 June 1743 – 26 August 1795), known by the alias Count Alessandro di Cagliostro, was an Italian occultist, self-styled magician and confidence trickster. He became a glamorous figure associated with the royal courts of Europe where he pursued various occult arts, including psychic healing, alchemy, and scrying. In his 1833 essay, Count Cagliostro, Carlyle pronounced him the "Quack of Quacks".

== Early life and education ==
Cagliostro's real name was Giuseppe Balsamo. Cagliostro himself, as well as many of his contemporaries and friends, stated that he was descended from the noble Byzantine Greek family of Komnenos; in particular, he claimed descent from the Megas Komnenos branch, which ruled the Empire of Trebizond. The fact that his original surname, Balsamo, is of Greek origin, as well as the fact that his birthplace, Albergheria, was largely inhabited by Greeks, support the fact that Cagliostro had, at least some, Greek ancestry.

Cagliostro's parents were Pietro and Felicita Balsamo. Pietro, the son of a ribbon merchant, owned a prosperous shop and the Balsamos were described as "honest tradespeople". However, for unknown reasons, Pietro was forced to declare bankruptcy and died at age 45, leaving his wife to raise Giuseppe, one brother and one sister. Giuseppe, called 'Beppo', was taken under the wing of his godfather and maternal uncle, Giuseppe Cagliostro, after whom the boy was named and whose surname he would adopt. Cagliostro Senior saw the child's intelligence and wanted him to be educated for the Church. He placed him in the care of the Hospitallers at the Seminary of St Roch di Palermo. The boy repeatedly ran away; each time, he was "recaptured in vagabond company". Beppo was then sent to the Benedictine convent Santissimo Salvatore near Caltagirone, which had high walls and where he was forced to train as a novice. Here, it was discovered that he had an aptitude for natural history and herbalism. He was placed under the tuition of an apothecary, from whom he learned the first principles of chemistry and medicine. He was soon able to manipulate drugs, but it was noted that he was eager to "discover secrets which would further the interests of charlatanry". It was also noted that he had a "natural perversity", and an "innate viciousness". Beppo escaped from the convent and returned to Palermo, where he fell into a life of drunkenness, gambling, brawling and frequent arrests. The influential people of the city, who were friends of his family, interceded to keep him out of jail. He sold forged theatre tickets, stole from his uncle, committed extortion against a friend, and forged a will to help another party illegally obtain an inheritance. While he was a skilled artist, and earned money by giving drawing lessons, he was also skilled "at arms" and engaged in duels. All of this occurred before he had turned 15. In his neighbourhood, he was known as "Beppo Maldetto", or "Beppo the Cursed".

By age 17, the rogue, still using the names Giuseppe Balsamo or Beppo Balsamo, had developed into an effective imposter, presenting himself as an initiate of the occult sciences. Handsome and haughty, and speaking little, Balsamo held others spell-bound. He had been seen evoking spirits and was believed to converse with angels. He attracted the attention of a superstitious goldsmith named Marano and told him of a treasure buried in an olive field. Balsamo told Marano that, through a ceremonial evocation, he could discover the precise location of the treasure; but, to carry out the ceremony, he needed 60 ounces of gold. Marano could not resist, and he met Balsamo in the olive field, with the gold. Balsamo carried out the ceremony, to the extent that Marano was overcome by emotion. He fell to the ground, and Balsamo began to beat him with sticks. Balsamo left the goldsmith for dead and fled with the gold. By the time the goldsmith had been delivered home and had reported the incident to police, Balsano had sailed for nearby Messina. Messina was the home of an aunt, the sister of his uncle Giuseppe Cagliostro. She was very wealthy but Beppo discovered that she had recently died, and had left her money to charity. However, he could still benefit from her reputation and, under his own name, he was wanted by police; he changed his name and was, from then on, known as Count Alessandro Cagliostro.

In Messina, Cagliostro met a man known only as 'Althotas'. For some time, it was thought that Cagliostro had invented him, but an investigation by the Roman Inquisition proved his statements true. Althotas was an alchemist, a chemist and a physician, fluent in several languages and educated "in the entire circle of human sciences". It was agreed that Cagliostro would become his student. Over the next three years, the pair travelled throughout Egypt and then, said Cagliostro, through "all the principal kingdoms of Africa and Asia", visiting and learning from priests and alchemists. Althotas claimed that he had discovered scientific methods of producing gold and precious stones; however it was achieved, they amassed a considerable sum of money. They also obtained letters of introduction to Manuel Pinto da Fonseca, Grand Master of the Order of Saint John, a powerful Portuguese nobleman who was infatuated with alchemy and who maintained his own laboratory at his home in Malta. Here, Cagliostro stated, Althotas died and his education was complete.

== Career ==
By this time, c. 1754 and aged 21, Cagliostro had earned the respect of Pinto, who inducted him as a Knight of Malta, supplied him with money and sent him to Naples, accompanied by the Chevalier d'Aquino, of the Neapolitan House of Caramanica. Here, with a priest he had known in Palermo, he attempted to open a gambling house. This attracted negative attention from the Neapolitan government and Cagliostro left for France. Here, he presented himself as a pious man, occasionally wearing the garb of a priest. He visited churches and was often at the homes of cardinals; these connections produced letters of introduction which led him, c. 1767, to Rome.

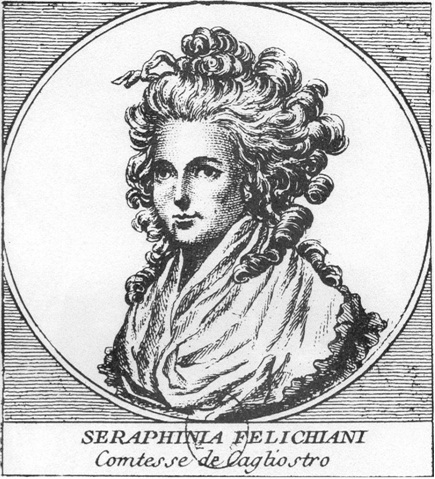
Serafina Cagliostro

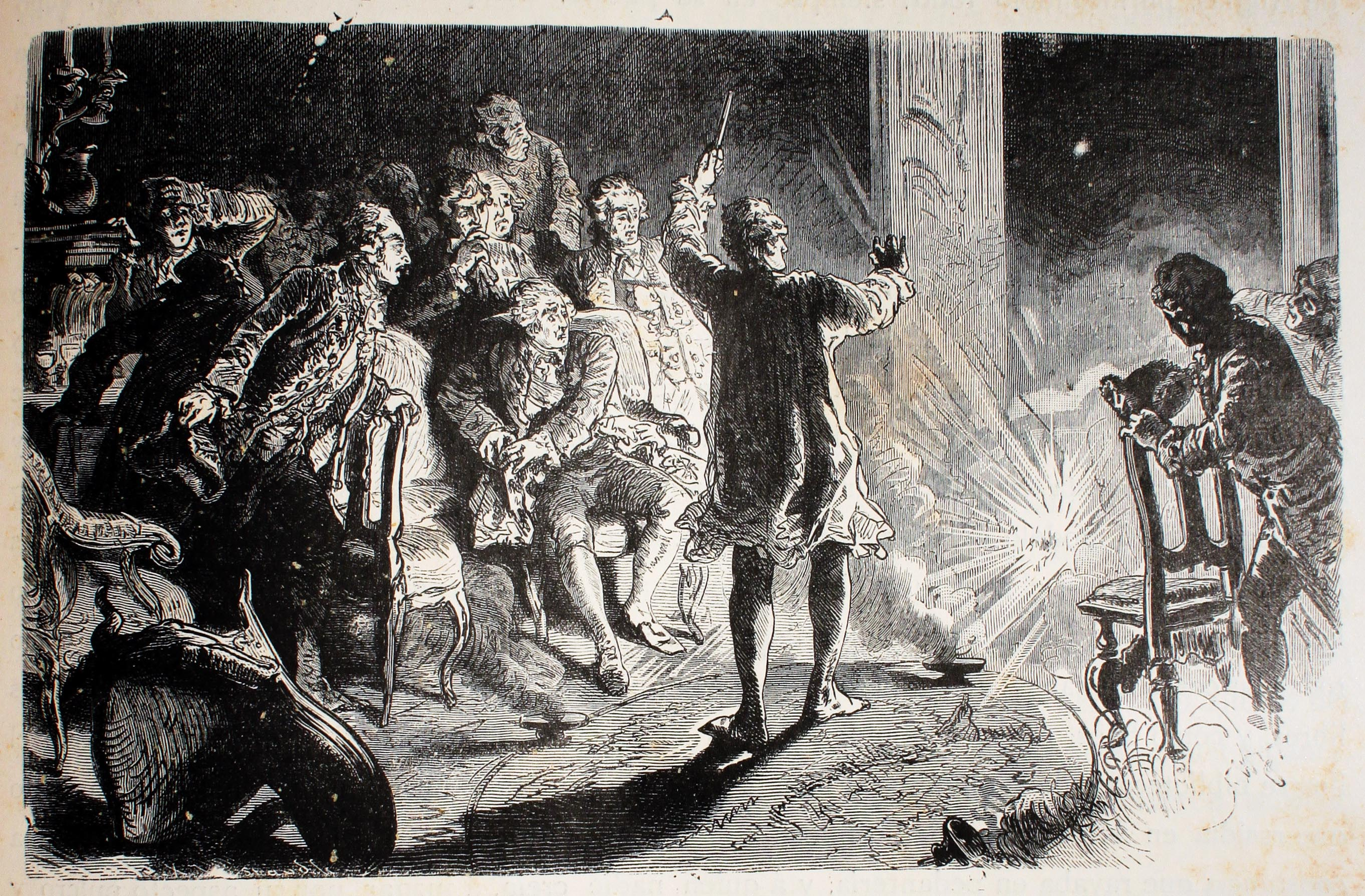
19th-century illustration of a Cagliostro performance in Dresden

In Rome, Cagliostro moved into the Antico Albergo del Sole al Pantheon (Hotel of the Sun). He made small sums by selling 'art', in fact, cheap drawings dressed up to appear valuable. He dressed well and presented himself as a man of noble birth. By now, his appearance had become less attractive—Carlyle describes him as a "dusky, bull-necked, mastiff-faced, sinister-looking individual". But when he met and fell in love with a beautiful 14-year-old girl named Lorenza Seraphinia Feliciani (c. 8 April 1751 – 1794), known as "Serafina", his presentation was enough to impress her father, who allowed them to marry in 1768. The couple lived with her parents but, as Lorenza testified, Cagliostro immediately began to teach her how to attract men and, in the most lascivious fashion, gratify them. This led to quarrels with her parents and the couple had to move to their own house. From there, Serafina was forced to "entangle" men with sexual favours, with her husband assuring her that adultery was no crime if it was used to advance a woman's interests. Also from that house, with two other men, Cagliostro made large sums of money by forging bills of exchange. They were eventually caught and had to flee Rome.

From then on, Cagliostro and Serafina spent years travelling. They tried to settle in Bergamo but Cagliostro's identity was discovered; they were briefly jailed then stripped of their funds and expelled from the city. They went through Galicia, to Genoa, then Antibes, Barcelona, Madrid and Lisbon, living on the proceeds of Serafina's prostitution and Cagliostro's various scams, which included the sale of 'amulets' and 'cures'. In 1776, they reached London, by which time they were financially comfortable. Here, Cagliostro made an enemy of the blackmailer Charles Théveneau de Morande, who was also the editor of Le Courier de l'Europe, a highly-influential Franco-British newspaper. Cagliostro saw the newspaper as a means of advancing his interests; de Morande, who knew all about Cagliostro's history, attempted to extract funds from him and was rebuffed. De Morande began exposing Cagliostro in print, making sure that everyone in Europe knew who and what he was. This exposure availed nothing; Cagliostro continued to be welcomed by the illustrious people of the day.

In 1772, the Cagliostros travelled to Paris in the company of another man, known only as 'M. Duplaisir', who was likely Serafina's lover. After Cagliostro had stolen all of his money, Duplaisir urged Serafina to flee and return to her parents. She took his advice but was thwarted by her husband, who used his connections to have her arrested. While Serafina spent several months in Sainte-Pélagie Prison, Cagliostro made a considerable sum of money selling a potion to "beautify the complexion". He then went further, claiming to be in possession of the solutions offered by the Hermetic Mystery, of the Elixir of life, and of the skills of the Philosopher's stone and mesmerism. Eventually, as people discovered his fraud, he was forced to flee. Accompanied by Serafina, he fled to Brussels, across Germany and Italy and, eventually, back to his native city of Palermo. His reason for returning to a city where he was a wanted man, for the incident with the goldsmith and the forging of the will, is not known, but he was immediately arrested and jailed. He was released when Serafina found a man to play the role of Marchese Pellegrini, a fictitious prince of Naples, who claimed to be the couple's protector and demanded that Cagliostro be set free. The couple was welcomed in Naples, travelled to Marseilles and back to Barcelona, where Cagliostro swindled an alchemist out of a considerable sum. They then returned to London.

On 12 April 1777, "Joseph Cagliostro" was admitted as a Freemason of the Espérance Lodge No. 289 in Gerrard Street, Soho, London. Carlyle reports that Serafina was also admitted, and made a 'Masoness', and that Lodge 289, which charged five guineas for admission, was of 'low rank' on the social scale. Cagliostro also found a book on Egyptian Masonry and, from then on, claimed to be a master of that art. Referring to himself as the "Grand Cophta", he brought others into lodge meetings and there, and at private homes, practised increasingly bizarre rituals on people, promising them "perfection" through "physical and moral regeneration". Eventually, he was arrested and spent some time in King's Bench Prison.

In December 1777, Cagliostro and Serafina left London and travelled through Switzerland, Germany and Prussia, visiting lodges of the Rite of Strict Observance looking for converts to Cagliostro's "Egyptian Freemasonry". In the spring of 1778, they arrived in Saint Petersburg. In spite of the ongoing exposure in Le Courier de l'Europe, and his increasingly rude and quarrelsome temperament, Cagliostro still had access to those in the highest levels of society, and he was able to offer his potions to the Empress, Catherine the Great. After her physician tested his wares and found them to be useless, the Prussian Ambassador formally complained that Cagliostro had been caught wearing a Prussian officer's uniform, and the Spanish Ambassador charged that he was wanted in Cádiz for forging bills, Cagliostro fled Russia. In Courland, the poet Countess Elisa von der Recke wanted his assistance in communicating with departed loved ones; she soon realised that he was a fake and publicly exposed him. After stealing a large sum of money from an aristocrat in Warsaw, Cagliostro and Serafina travelled to Vienna, Frankfurt and, in 1783, Strasbourg. By now, they were very wealthy, sumptuously dressed and accompanied by many servants. The couple entertained, and lived, lavishly. Privately, looking "haggard and jaded", they no longer got along and "brawling abounded".

In Strasbourg, where Cagliostro donated to the poor and treated people with "Extract of Saturn", he was able to lure into his net the enormously wealthy Prince Cardinal de Rohan, Archbishop of Strasbourg, telling him "Your soul is worthy of mine; you deserve to be made participator of all my secrets." The two became fast friends, with Cagliostro using Rohan's influence and money to his own ends. In 1784, with Rohan in Paris, Cagliostro was again on the move, establishing Egyptian Masonic lodges in Naples, Bourdeaux and Lyon. By 1785, Cagliostro was in Paris, where both men became embroiled in the Affair of the Diamond Necklace. They were arrested and jailed in the Bastille for nine months. On 31 May 1786, Cagliostro was acquitted but banished from France. He and Serafina returned to London.

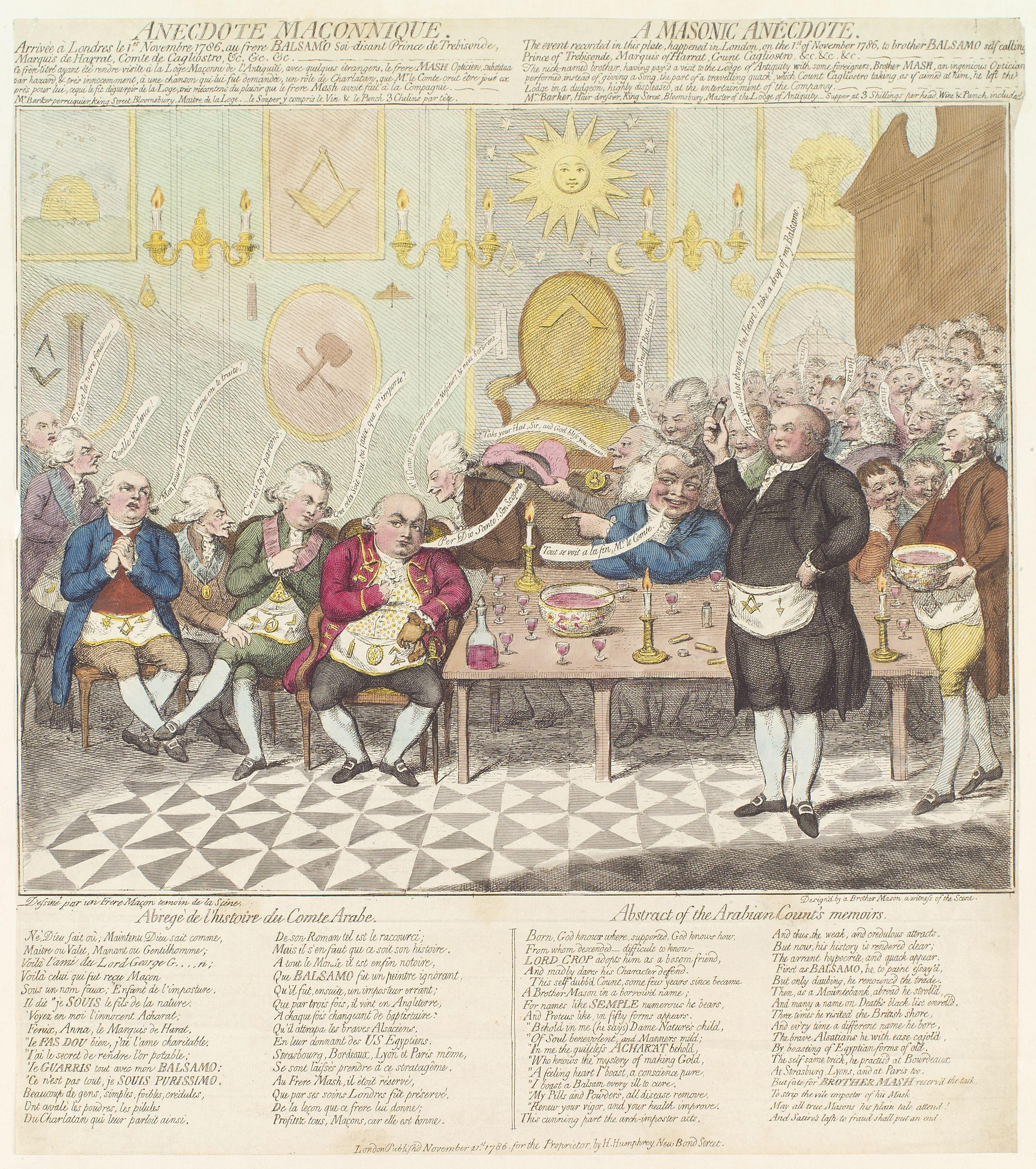
Satire on Cagliostro at a Masonic meeting in London in 1786, by James Gillray

== Downfall and death ==
While Cagliostro was in London, the French government hired a Palermo lawyer to conduct a full genealogical and biographical report on Cagliostro. During his 1788 tour of Italy, Johann Goethe met the lawyer and heard all about Joseph Balsamo. As he related in his Italian Journey, Goethe went to see Cagliostro's family. He found Felicità Balsamo still alive and living in poverty with her daughter and grandchildren. Cagliostro still owed his sister a large sum of money and had abandoned his family.

In London, Cagliostro had finally been able to deal with Le Courier de l'Europe, by forcing Charles Morande to print a public retraction and apology for all that he had written about him. In his 1787 Letter to England, which he sent to several newspapers and magazines, Cagliostro claimed to set the record straight, blaming various other parties for misunderstandings and unjust accusations and prosecutions. But the damage had been done; his 'Egyptian Pills', potions and rituals were not selling, the English government was investigating him, and he knew he was being watched by French spies.

In May 1787, the couple left London, but they had nowhere to go. They were thrown out of Switzerland, Savoy and Turin and began pawning their belongings to survive. By May 1789, Serafina had had enough and insisted that they return to Rome. Cagliostro tried to establish a Masonic Lodge in Rome; for this, on 29 December 1789, he was arrested by the Inquisition and locked up in the Castel Sant'Angelo. Serafina was also jailed. She had begun to tell others the truth about her husband months earlier; now, she confessed everything. Thinking that he could talk his way out of prison, Cagliostro began to offer counter-confessions. Serafina was sent to a convent, where she died in 1794, age 43. In April 1791, the Inquisition, now in possession of the Palermo lawyer's investigatory results, officially condemned Egyptian Masonry and sentenced Cagliostro to life in prison. He died in his cell at the Forte di San Leo on 26 August 1795, age 52.

== Legacy ==
Portuguese author Camilo Castelo Branco credits Joseph Balsamo with the creation of the Egyptian Rite of the Freemasons and intensive work in the diffusion of Freemasonry, by opening lodges all over Europe and by introducing the acceptance of women into the community. The idea of an "Egyptian freemasonry" was maintained in Italy by the Rite of Misraïm, founded in 1813 by the three Jewish Bédarride brothers and in France, the Rite of Memphis founded in 1838 by Jacques Etienne Marconis de Nègre; these unified under Giuseppe Garibaldi as the Ancient and Primitive Rite of Memphis-Misraïm in 1881.

Cagliostro is also rumoured to have received initiation into the Egyptian Rite in Naples under the guidance of Raimondo di Sangro, Prince of Sansevero, around 1767.

Cagliostro was an extraordinary forger. Giacomo Casanova, in his autobiography, narrated an encounter in which Cagliostro was able to forge a letter by Casanova, despite being unable to understand it. Occult historian Lewis Spence comments in his entry on Cagliostro that the swindler put his wealth, acquired by trickery, to good use by starting and funding a chain of maternity hospitals and orphanages around the continent. He carried an alchemistic manuscript, The Most Holy Trinosophia, amongst others, with him on his ill-fated journey to Rome, and it is alleged that he wrote it.

== In popular culture ==
=== Stage ===
- After her experience with Cagliostro and other charlatans, Catherine the Great wrote three anti-occult plays, in German and in Russian: Der Betrüger (The Fraudster; 1785), Der Verblendete (The Deluded One; 1785), and Der Sibirische Schaman (The Siberian Shaman; 1786).
- Johann Wolfgang von Goethe wrote a comedy based on Cagliostro's life, Der Gross-Cophta (The Great Cophta; 1791).
- Latvian playwright Mārtiņš Zīverts wrote the play Kaļostro Vilcē (Cagliostro in Vilce) in 1967.

=== Literature ===
- In the 1816 short story "The Sandman" by E. T. A. Hoffmann, Spallanzani is said to resemble a portrait of Cagliostro by Daniel Chodowiecki.

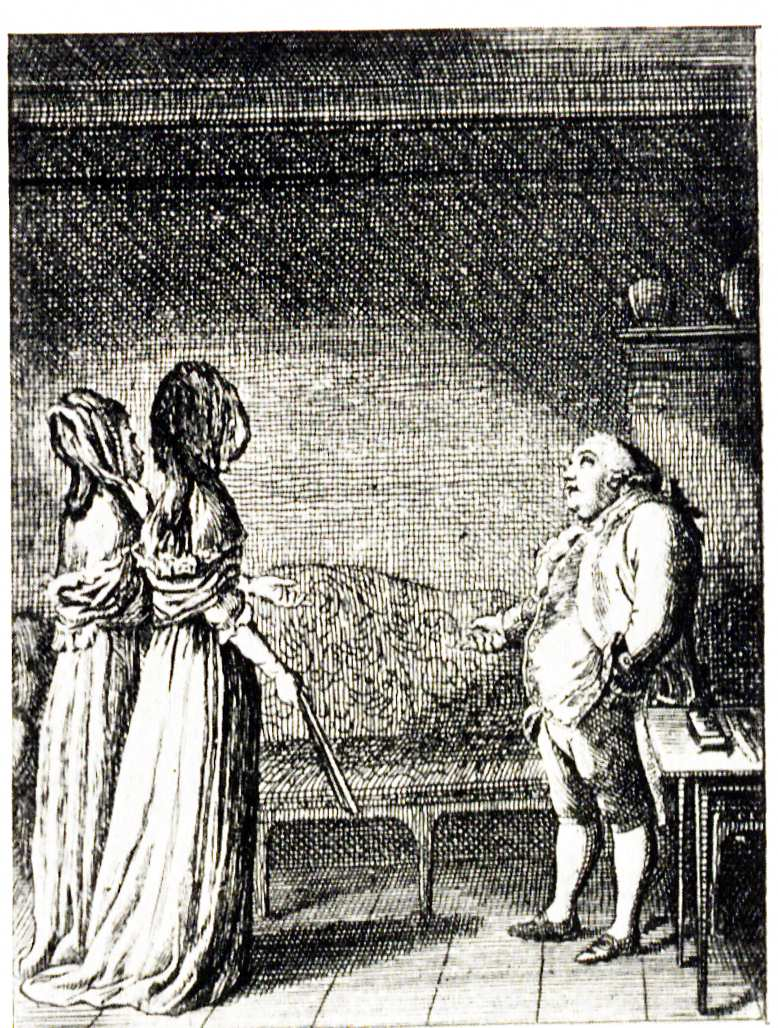
Cagliostro by Daniel Chodowiecki

- George Sand includes Cagliostro as a minor character in her historical novel The Countess of Rudolstadt (1843).
- Alexandre Dumas père used Cagliostro in several of his novels, especially in Le Collier de la Reine (The Queen's Necklace, 1850), Joseph Balsamo (1853) and The Countess de Charny (1855).
- Mikhail Kuzmin wrote a novella called The Marvelous Life of Giuseppe Balsamo, Count Cagliostro (1916).
- Aleksey Nikolayevich Tolstoy wrote the supernatural love story Count Cagliostro (1921), in which the Count brings to life a long-dead Russian princess. The story inspired the 1984 Soviet TV movie Formula of Love.
- Harry Stephen Keeler paid tribute to the magician in his 1929 novel The Spectacles of Mr. Cagliostro.
- William Bolitho Ryall's Twelve Against the Gods (1929) has a section on Cagliostro.
- Josephine Balsamo, a descendant of Joseph Balsamo who calls herself Countess Cagliostro, appears in Maurice Leblanc's Arsène Lupin novels (1905–1932).
- Cagliostro Street appears as a location in John Dickson Carr's 1935 novel The Hollow Man, aka The Three Coffins.
- In The Book and the Beast, a 1943 short story by Robert Arthur Jr., the use of a grimoire attributed to Cagliostro causes gruesome deaths.
- Cagliostro is featured in three stories by Rafael Sabatini, The Lord of Time, The Death Mask and The Alchemical Egg, which are included in his 1946 collection Turbulent Tales.
- There are numerous references to Cagliostro in the 1946 detective novel He Who Whispers by John Dickson Carr.
- In Robert A. Heinlein's Glory Road (1963), the Empress Star uses "Balsamo" as an alias, and refers to Giuseppe Balsamo as her uncle.
- Cagliostro is frequently mentioned in Umberto Eco's 1988 novel Foucault's Pendulum.
- Cagliostro is a character in Robert Anton Wilson's The Historical Illuminatus Chronicles (1991).
- Cagliostro makes a number of appearances as a vampire in Kim Newman's Anno Dracula series of novels (1992-2022).
- Cagliostro is a character in the 1997 novel Superstition by David Ambrose.
- Cagliostro is a character in Psychoshop, a 1998 novel by Alfred Bester and Roger Zelazny.
- Cagliostro is often mentioned in the 2007 novel Napoleon's Pyramids by William Dietrich in connection with Freemasons and ancient Egyptian artifacts.
- In the novel Kun Lun by Kilburn Hall (2014), Alessandro Cagliostro, Joseph Balsamo and Giuseppe Balsamo are names that the time traveller Count St. Germain has used.

=== Music ===
- Cagliostro appears as a principal character in the 1794 opera Le congrès des rois, a collaborative work of 12 composers.
- The French composer Victor Dourlen (1780–1864) composed the first act to Cagliostro, ou Les illuminés which premiered on 27 November 1810.
- Adolphe Adam wrote the opéra comique Cagliostro which premiered on 10 February 1844.
- The Irish composer William Michael Rooke (1794–1847) wrote the (unperformed) opera Cagliostro.
- In 1850, Albert Lortzing wrote the libretto for a comic opera Cagliostro, but did not compose music for it.
- In 1875, Johann Strauß (Sohn) wrote the operetta Cagliostro in Wien (Cagliostro in Vienna).
- The French composer Claude Terrasse (1867–1923) wrote Le Cagliostro which premiered in 1904.
- The Polish composer Jan Maklakiewicz (1899–1954) wrote the ballet Cagliostro w Warszawie which premiered in 1938.
- The opera Cagliostro by the Italian composer Ildebrando Pizzetti (1880–1968) was performed on Italian radio in 1952 and at La Scala on 24 January 1953.
- The Romanian composer Iancu Dumitrescu (1944–) wrote the 1975 work Le miroir de Cagliostro for choir, flute and percussion.
- The comic opera Graf Cagliostro was written by Mikael Tariverdiev in 1983.
- The American composer John Zorn (1953–) composed Cagliostro for solo viola in 2015.

=== Film ===
- Cagliostro has been portrayed in film by:
  - Georges Méliès, Le Miroir de Cagliostro (Cagliostro's Mirror) (1899)
  - Fryderyk Jarossy, Kaliostro (1918)
  - Reinhold Schünzel, The Count of Cagliostro (1920)
  - Hans Stüwe, Cagliostro (1929)
  - Boris Karloff, The Mummy (1932)
  - Ferdinand Marian, Münchhausen (1943)
  - Orson Welles, Black Magic (1949)
  - Howard Vernon, The Erotic Rites of Frankenstein (1972)
  - Bekim Fehmiu, Cagliostro (1975)
  - Tarō Ishida, Lupin III: The Castle of Cagliostro (1979)
  - Nodar Mgaloblishvili, Formula of Love (1984)
  - Nicol Williamson, Spawn (1997)
  - Christopher Walken, The Affair of the Necklace (2001)
  - Robert Englund, The Return of Cagliostro (2003)

=== Television ===
- Cagliostro appears as a depraved sorcerer, played by Henry Daniell, in a 1961 episode of the series Thriller, titled "The Prisoner in the Mirror".
- Jean Marais portrays Cagliostro in the 1973 mini-series Joseph Balsamo.
- In "Diana's Disappearing Act", a 1978 episode of the Wonder Woman TV series, a descendant of Cagliostro's (played by Dick Gautier) is the villain. Attempting alchemy, he succeeds in temporarily turning lead into gold.
- A magician named Cagliostro (Jose Ferrer) is murdered in "Death Casts a Spell", a 1984 episode of Murder She Wrote.
- In "The Pharaoh's Curse", episode 36 of the 2002 series The Twilight Zone, an illusionist played by Xander Berkeley strives to learn the secrets behind a centuries-old illusion, which has originated with Cagliostro.
- Cagliostro and Lorentzia (Serafina), appear as antagonists in the 2006 TV anime Le Chevalier d'Eon. While Cagliostro is portrayed as a bumbling money-grubber, Lorentzia has magic powers.
- Cagliostro is a swindling alchemist in the 2012 anime TV series Senki Zesshou Symphogear AXZ.
- In the series Samurai Jack (the seventh episode of the third season, 2020), the title character follows a quest for the crystal of Cagliostro.
- In the Marvel Cinematic Universe series What If...? (2021-2024), Cagliostro is an ancient, millennia-old sorcerer.

=== Comics ===
- The Phantom comic book (based on a comic strip of the same name) featured Cagliostro as a character in the 1988 story "The Cagliostro Mystery", written by Norman Worker and drawn by Carlos Cruz.
- The third Kid Eternity comic book, published in 1946, featured Cagliostro's risen spirit.
- In the DC Comics universe, Cagliostro is described as an immortal (JLA Annual 2), a descendant of Leonardo da Vinci as well as an ancestor of Zatara and Zatanna (Secret Origins 27).
- In Marvel Comics' Tomb of Dracula and Dracula Lives comic books, Cagliostro is a frequent enemy of Dracula. In Iron Man #149, Cagliostro trains Doctor Doom in sorcery.
- The manga Rozen Maiden gives Count Cagliostro as one of many aliases adopted by the legendary dollmaker Rozen. He was shown to be in prison whittling wood.
- He is a character in Todd McFarlane's comic book Spawn. He was introduced to the series by writer Neil Gaiman. Here, Cogliostro was once a spawn of Hell bound by his duty to the daemon Malebolgia. Having freed himself of the curse through alchemy and sorcery, he is teaching Spawn to do the same throughout the series.

=== Video games ===
- Cagliostro is the namesake of a playable character in the Japanese Mobile game Granblue Fantasy.
- Payday 2 by Overkill and Starbreeze studios features Cagliostro's manuscript as a key story item and opens a deep mystery within the game involving secret societies, immortality and nephilims.
- Cagliostro is a villain in the Spiders video game Steelrising. His penchant for magic and alternative medicine is referenced; for example, in one scene, he is shown practising hypnosis with a pendulum.
- Cagliostro is featured in Fate/Grand Order as a Pretender-class servant.
- Cagliostro appears as an opponent in the card cheating game Card Shark.
