= The Queen's Necklace (1946 film) =

- Directed by: Marcel L'Herbier
- Written by: Frantz Funck-Brentano; Charles Spaak
- Starring: Viviane Romance; Maurice Escande; Jacques Dacqmine
- Cinematography: Roger Hubert
- Edited by: Émilienne Nelissen
- Music by: Maurice Thiriet
- Production company: Île de France Film
- Distributed by: Consortium du Film
- Release date: 11 September 1946
- Running time: 118 minutes
- Country: France
- Language: French

The Queen's Necklace (French: L'affaire du collier de la reine) is a 1946 French historical drama film directed by Marcel L'Herbier and starring Viviane Romance, Maurice Escande and Jacques Dacqmine. The film portrays the Affair of the Diamond Necklace which damaged the reputation of the French queen Marie Antionette during the 1780s.

It was shot at the Saint-Maurice Studios and on location at the Palace of Versailles. The film's sets were designed by the art director Max Douy.

== Cast ==
- Viviane Romance as Jeanne de la Motte
- Maurice Escande as Cardinal de Rohan
- Jacques Dacqmine as Rétaux de Villette
- Michel Salina as Comte de la Motte
- Jean Hébey as King Louis XVI
- Marion Dorian as Marie Antoinette
- Pierre Dux as Alessandro Cagliostro
- Jean-Louis Allibert as Camille Desmoulins
- Pierre Bertin as Abbé Loth
- Palau as Boehmer
- Pierre Magnier as Procureur Joly de Fleury
- Paul Amiot as Maître Doillot, l'avocat de Jeanne
- Marcel Delaître as Maître Target, l'avocat de Rohan
- Hélène Bellanger as Duchess of Polignac
- Florence Lynn as Princesse de Lamballe
- Robert Dartois as Monsieur de Soubise
- Saint-Pol as Bijoutier Bassange
- André Philip as Deschamps
- André Varennes as Premier président d'Aligre
- Marcel Vibert as Avocat général Séguier
- André Wasley as Pierre André de Suffren
- Marcel Lagrange as Duc de Villeroi
- Monique Cassin as Nicole, la fille Oliva
- Luc Andrieux as Un geôlier
- Jacques Berlioz
- Chukry-Bey
- Jacques François as Comte d'Artois
- Lucas Gridoux as Un membre du Parlement
- Pierre Labry as Hubert
- Philippe Lemaire
- Johnny Marchand
- Jean-Pierre Mocky as Un page de la reine
- Jean Morel as M. de Breteuil
- Paul Ménager
- Philippe Olive as Maître Breton
- Georges Paulais as Un huissier
- Marcel Rouzé
- Roger Vincent as Un abbé de cour
- Yvonne Yma as La femme Hubert

== Bibliography ==
- Klossner, Michael. The Europe of 1500-1815 on Film and Television: A Worldwide Filmography of Over 2550 Works, 1895 Through 2000. McFarland, 2002.
