= List of ambassadors of France to the Kingdom of Great Britain =

A list of French ambassadors to the Kingdom of Great Britain:

== French diplomats to the Kingdom of Great Britain ==
Arms of Royal House of Bourbon

Image	From	Until	Ambassadors
	1697	1701	Camille d'Hostun de La Baume, comte later duc de Tallard
	1701	1715	Jean-Baptiste Colbert, marquis de Croissy et de Torcy (Secretary of State for Foreign Affairs of France)
	1701	1702	Chevalier Jean-Baptiste de Poussin (Acting Attaché)
	1702	1705	Louis de Rouvroy, duc de Saint-Simon (Chargé d'affaires)
	1703	1710	Abbé François Gaultier (Acting Attaché)
	1705	1707	Nathaniel, Baron Hooke (Military Attaché: Brigadier-General, French Army)
	1708	1710	Charles Auguste de Goyon, Count of Gacé (Chargé d'affaires)
	1710	1710	Count Luigi Ferdinando Marsigli (Franco-Italian Acting Attaché)
	1711	1711	Chevalier Nicolas Mesnager (Acting Attaché)
	1712	1712	Louis d'Aumont, 3rd Duke of Aumont (Minister Plenipotentiary)
	1712	1713	Nicolas du Blé, marquis of Clermont and d'Huxelles (Minister Plenipotentiary)
	1713	1713	Nicolas Mesnager, later comte de Saint-Jean (Acting Attaché)
	1713	1716	Charles-François d'Iberville, marquis de La Bonde
	1716	1718	Abbé Guillaume Dubois (later Cardinal)
	1716	1722	Philippe Néricault Destouches, later comte de Langeron (Acting Attaché)
	1718	1718	Yves d'Alègre, marquis de Tourzel
	1718	1720	Henri, marquis de Saint-Nectaire
	1722	1724	Théodore Chevignard de Chavigny, comte de Toulongeon
	1724	1727	François-Marie, comte later duc de Broglie
	1727	1731	Joachim Trotti, marquis de La Chétardie
	1731	1731	Théodore Chevignard de Chavigny, comte de Toulongeon
	1731	1732	Abbé Jacques Deschamps (alias Morel Deschamps, Acting Attaché)
	1733	1735	Philippe de Montboissier de Beaufort, marquis de Canillac
	1735	1736	Bishop Roger de Bussy-Rabutin (Minister Plenipotentiary)
	1737	1739	Gaston-Pierre-Charles de Lévis, vicomte de Lomagne later duc de Mirepoix
	1740	1740	Chevalier Étienne de Silhouette (Acting Attaché)
	1741	1742	Gabriel-Jacques de Salignac, vicomte de Saint-Julien later marquis de Fénelon (Ambassador Extraordinary)
War of Austrian Succession (1741–1748)
	1746	1747	Jerónimo, duc de Grimaldi
	1747	1747	General Ricardo Wall y Devereux (Military Attaché (Borbón-Condé)) (Note: General Ricardo Wall y Devereux's diplomatic mission to London was for negotiating peace between the Bourbons and Great Britain but ran into difficulties partly because of reservations in British ministerial quarters about his Irish and Jacobite roots. He later served as Prime Minister of Spain.)
	1747	1748	Bishop Guy de Guérapin de Vauréal (Acting Attaché)
	1748	1749	Louis de Cardevac, marquis d'Havrincourt (Minister Plenipotentiary)
	1749	1754	Gaston-Pierre-Charles de Lévis, duc de Mirepoix (Ambassador Extraordinary)
	1751	1752	Antoine-François, marquis de Lambertye (Chargé d'affaires)
	1752	1753	Charles Gravier, comte de Vergennes (Minister Plenipotentiary)
	1754	1754	François Beauharnais de Beaumont, marquis de La Ferté (Military Attaché)
	1754	1755	Charles-François de Broglie, marquis de Ruffec (Ambassador Extraordinary)
	1756	1757	Chevalier Charles d'Éon (Acting Attaché)
	1758	1761	Chevalier Jacques-Abraham Durand d'Aubigny (Minister Plenipotentiary)
Seven Years' War (1756–1752)
	1762	1763	Louis-Jules Barbon Mancini-Mazzarini, duc de Nevers
	1763	1767	Claude-Louis-François Régnier, comte de Guerchy later marquis de Blosset
	1768	1770	Louis-Marie-Florent de Lomont d'Haraucourt, duc du Châtelet
	1770	1776	Jean-Étienne Say (Acting Attaché)
	1770	1776	Adrien-Louis de Bonnières, duc de Guînes
	1776	1778	Emmanuel-Marie-Louis, marquis de Noailles
American War of Independence (1778–1782)
	1783	1783	Elénor-François-Elie, marquis de Moustier (Chargé d'affaires)
	1784	1787	Jean-Balthazar, comte d'Adhémar (Minister Plenipotentiary)
	1788	1791	Anne-César, chevalier later marquis de La Luzerne
French Revolution (1792–1801)
	1791	1792	Jean-Marie de Bancalis de Maurel, marquis d'Aragon
	1792	1793	François-Bernard de Chauvelin, marquis de Grosbois
	1792	1793	Charles de Talleyrand-Périgord, Bishop emeritus later Prince de Talleyrand (Envoy Extraordinary)
	1793	1793	Citizen Hugues Maret later duc de Bassano (Envoy Extraordinary)
	1793	1794	Citizen François later marquis de Barthélemy (Envoy Extraordinary)
	1794	1794	Citizen Claude Monneron (Envoy Extraordinary)

== See also ==
- List of ambassadors of France to England
- List of ambassadors of France to the United Kingdom
- Foreign Affairs Ministers during the French Revolution (French Wikipedia)
- French Revolutionary Government Foreign Ministers (French Wikipedia)
