= Louis Auguste Le Tonnelier de Breteuil =

French aristocrat and diplomat (1730–1807)

Louis Auguste Le Tonnelier
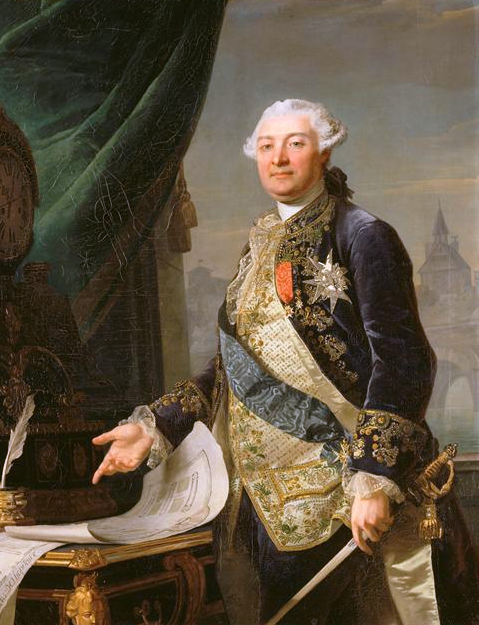
- Portrait by François-Guillaume Ménageot

Chief Minister of the French Monarch
- In office 11 July 1789 – 16 July 1789
- Monarch: Louis XVI
- Preceded by: Jacques Necker
- Succeeded by: Jacques Necker

Secretary of State of the Maison du Roi
- In office 1784 – 24 July 1788
- Monarch: Louis XVI
- Preceded by: Antoine-Jean Amelot de Chaillou
- Succeeded by: Pierre-Charles Laurent de Villedeuil

Ambassador of France to Austria
- In office 1774–1783
- Monarch: Louis XVI
- Preceded by: Jean-François Géorgel

Viguier of the French Co-Prince of Andorra
- In office 1780–1783
- Monarch: Louis XVI
- Preceded by: Jean de Perper
- Succeeded by: Joseph Bonifaci Goma Montou

Ambassador of France to the United Kingdom
- In office 1760–1770
- Monarch: Louis XV
- Preceded by: Aimeric Joseph de Durfort-Civrac
- Succeeded by: Jacques-Abraham Durand d'Aubigny

Personal details
- Born: 7 March 1730 Azay-le-Ferron, Kingdom of France
- Died: 2 November 1807 (aged 77) Paris, French Empire

Louis Charles Auguste Le Tonnelier, Baron de Breteuil, Baron de Preuilly (French: [lwi oɡyst lə tɔnəlje də bʁətœj]; 7 March 1730 – 2 November 1807) was a French aristocrat, diplomat and statesman. He was the last chief minister of the Bourbon Monarchy, appointed by King Louis XVI only one hundred hours before the storming of the Bastille.

== Soldier and ambassador ==
Breteuil was born in 1730 at the Château d'Azay-le-Ferron (Indre) into a well-connected aristocratic family: one of his relations was confessor to the king's cousin and another was the famed mathematician and linguist Émilie, marquise du Châtelet-Laumont. He received an excellent education in Paris and later joined the army, where he fought in the Seven Years' War. In 1758 he left the army and joined the French Foreign Ministry. He was quickly appointed French ambassador to the Archbishop-elector of Cologne, where he proved to have valuable diplomatic skills. Two years later in 1760 he was sent to St Petersburg as the French ambassador to Imperial Russia, where he arranged to be temporarily absent from his post at the time of the palace revolution by which Catherine II was placed on the throne. In 1763 he was sent to Stockholm (Sweden), and subsequently represented his government at Vienna in 1770 (Habsburg monarchy), in 1773 Naples (Kingdom of Naples), and again at Vienna until 1783.

In Sweden, he became a favourite friend of the young King Gustav III, but Catherine the Great of Russia disliked him. Others saw Breteuil as a loud and impulsive fool, Joseph II and several high-ranking Austrian politicians sneered at the "fool" behind closed doors.

== Household Minister ==
During the riots of 1783, when the nobility protested against arbitrary imprisonments, the minister Bréteuil decided to abolish incarceration at the Chateau de Vincennes, which was transformed into a granary, and Bréteuil even permitted visitors to examine the oubliettes. But this may have backfired, as, according to Joseph Droz, people were horrified at what they saw, and that even given this, "that in the Bastille there were even worse things to be seen."

After he returned to France, Breteuil was appointed Minister of the King's Household. In this capacity he introduced considerable reforms in prison administration. He was a liberal and humanitarian minister, and succeeded in moderating the censorship laws. He believed passionately that the monarchy should encourage intellectuals, and not view them as enemies. In 1784 he was named to a position in the Académie des Inscriptions et Belles-Lettres.

Breteuil's time as Household Minister corresponded with the infamous Affair of the Diamond Necklace, which pitted him against his enemy, the Cardinal de Rohan. Breteuil's loyalty to Queen Marie Antoinette earned him her gratitude and trust at this difficult time. Unfortunately, Breteuil underestimated the strength of public sympathy for those responsible, and his direct attack on Rohan left the Queen open to public humiliation. He presently came into collision with Charles Alexandre de Calonne, who demanded his dismissal in 1787.

On 14 September 1788, anti-monarchy protests renewed, and in October 1788, protestors demanded money for fireworks, they demanded that anyone in a carriage dismount and salute to Henri IV, and they also burned effigies representing Breteuil, as well as Calonne and the Duchess de Polignac. They then proposed burning Marie Antoinette in effigy, but the troops were deployed and they dispersed the crowds with great bloodshed in the Place de la Grève.

On 24 July 1788, Breteuil resigned, exhausted by the struggle for power in the King's Council. He then asked to be allowed to say farewell to the queen. Marie-Antoinette did not resent him for his handling of the affair, and even promised to help him in future if she could.

== Appointment as Prime Minister ==
As France became increasingly unstable, Breteuil retired to his château in Dangu. Though Breteuil was disgusted with French politics at the time, he remained absolutely loyal to the Monarchy, despite his liberal views on social culture. He complained that "anybody who dares to stand up for the old ways is despised" and claimed that "we are rushing like madmen to our destruction".

Breteuil was contacted by conservative members of the queen's circle in 1789. He agreed to become Chief minister once they had ousted Jacques Necker from the post. Necker was popular, but royalists saw him as a dangerous publicity-seeker and a radical. A carefully orchestrated plan was drawn-up by Breteuil, the duchesse de Polignac, the King's brother the comte d'Artois and with the support of Marie-Antoinette. However, unable to restrain his hatred for Necker, the comte d'Artois rushed ahead with the plan too early. Necker was dismissed weeks before Breteuil believed he should be. Breteuil was appointed Chief minister on 12 July 1789. Partly as a result of Necker's dismissal, the Bastille was stormed on 14 July.

== Government in exile ==
In such dangerous times, many prominent Royalists were forced to flee France. The duchesse de Polignac escaped to Switzerland, and Louis XVI sent the comte d'Artois abroad to save him from assassination. Breteuil went first to Spa (in present-day Belgium) before journeying to Switzerland with the first party of émigrés.

The French royal family were placed under house arrest in October. The hatred and violence surrounding them gave the Queen reason to fear for her family's life. To Marie Antoinete's horror and disgust, Artois (living in Turin) then appointed Calonne to his council. Marie Antoinette despised Calonne, and his appointment was the end of her friendship with her brother-in-law. She was convinced that he could no longer be trusted to preserve the monarchy's best interests. It was Marie Antoinette's decision, therefore, that Breteuil be appointed Prime Minister-in-exile. Louis XVI supported her in this move, but it was Marie Antoinette who took the initiative and formalised Breteuil's appointment. In effect, he was now the Royal Family's chief diplomat abroad. At Soleure, in November 1790, he received from Louis XVI exclusive powers to negotiate with the European courts, and in his efforts to check the ill-advised diplomacy of the émigré princes, he soon brought himself into opposition with his old rival Calonne, who held a chief place in their councils.

== Varennes ==
In coordination with Marie Antoinette's favourite, the Swedish count Axel von Fersen, Breteuil organised the royal family's escape from Paris in 1791, garnering support from King Gustav III of Sweden. The attempt almost succeeded, but was foiled at the last minute by Jean-Baptiste Drouet, the Republican son of a local postmaster. It was also Breteuil who negotiated with the monarchies of Europe to persuade them to fight the French Revolution and, later, attempted to organize economic warfare against the French Republic. After the failure of the flight to Varennes, Breteuil received instructions from Louis XVI, designed to restore amicable relations with the princes. His distrust of the king's brothers and his defense of Louis XVI's prerogative were to some extent justified, but his intransigent attitude towards these princes emphasized the dissensions of the royal family in the eyes of foreign sovereigns, who looked on the comte de Provence as the natural representative of his brother and found a pretext for non-interference on Louis's behalf in the contradictory statements of the negotiators.

His attempts were ultimately in vain. The Bourbon monarchy in France was overthrown in 1792, followed by massacres of many Royalists in Paris. In January 1793, Louis XVI was executed. In October, Marie Antoinette met a similar fate. In 1795, their son, Louis XVII died in prison.

== Later life ==
Breteuil himself was the object of violent attacks from the party of the princes, who asserted that he persisted in exercising powers which had been revoked by Louis XVI. After the execution of Marie Antoinette he retired into private life near Hamburg. Breteuil spent the next decade in exile. His loyalty to the House of Bourbon had ended with the death of the little boy-king in 1795. He was hated by Louis XVI's two surviving brothers, particularly by the comte d'Artois.

Breteuil was allowed to return to France in 1802 by Napoleon Bonaparte, having made his peace with the First French Empire. He tried to urge other Royalists to join him, but he was largely unsuccessful. Most preferred to stay loyal to the exiled Bourbons.

Breteuil died in France in 1807. A Bourbon Restoration occurred in 1814, but was deposed again by the 1830 July Revolution.

== Legacy ==
Breteuil's secret correspondence with Louis XVI and Marie Antoinette was discovered in an Austrian castle by historian Munro Price. His findings were presented in The Fall of the French Monarchy: Louis XVI, Marie-Antoinette and the baron de Breteuil, (sometimes titled The Road from Versailles). To date, it is the most comprehensive book on Breteuil's career and his fight to save the French Monarchy.

The Pavillon de Breteuil, in Sèvres, France, home of the International Bureau of Weights and Measures, is named after the baron.

== Sources ==
- Munro Price, "The ministry of the hundred hours : a reappraisal", French History, 4.3 (1990), pp 317–339
- Munro Price, The Baron de Breteuil : A First Minister in Emigration, The French Émigrés in Europe, 1789-1814, (London:Institut Français) 1999

Political offices
Preceded by Philippe Henri, marquis de Ségur	Secretary of State for War; 1787	Succeeded by Athanase Louis Marie de Loménie, comte de Brienne
