= The Affair of the Necklace =

2001 film by Charles Shyer

- Theatrical release poster
- Directed by: Charles Shyer
- Written by: John Sweet
- Produced by: Charles Shyer; Redmond Morris; Andrew A. Kosove; Broderick Johnson
- Starring: Hilary Swank; Jonathan Pryce; Simon Baker; Adrien Brody; Joely Richardson; Christopher Walken
- Narrated by: Brian Cox
- Cinematography: Ashley Rowe
- Edited by: David Moritz
- Music by: David Newman
- Production company: Alcon Entertainment
- Distributed by: Warner Bros. Pictures (United States); Summit Entertainment (International)
- Release dates: November 30, 2001 (limited); December 7, 2001 (United States)
- Running time: 118 minutes
- Country: United States
- Language: English
- Budget: $30 million
- Box office: $1.2 million

The Affair of the Necklace is a 2001 American historical drama film directed by Charles Shyer and written by John Sweet, based on the 1785 scandal at the court of Louis XVI that became known as the Affair of the Diamond Necklace, which contributed to discreditation of the French monarchy on the eve of the French Revolution.

It had a limited release on November 30, 2001, before being released in the US on December 7. The film received negative reviews from critics. The film became a box-office bomb, grossing approximately $1.2 million worldwide against a budget of $30 million. At the 74th Academy Awards, it received a nomination for the Best Costume Design.

== Plot ==
Jeanne de Valois-Saint-Rémy, orphaned at an early age, is determined to reclaim her noble title and the home taken from her family when she was a child. When she is rebuffed by Marie Antoinette and fails to achieve her goal through legal channels, she joins forces with the arrogant, well-connected gigolo Rétaux de Villette and her own wayward, womanizing husband Nicholas. They concoct a plan to earn her enough money to purchase the property.

King Louis XV had commissioned Parisian jewelers Boehmer & Bassenge to create an opulent 2,800-carat (560 g), 647-diamond necklace to present to his mistress Madame du Barry, but the king died before it was completed. Hoping to recover the high cost of the necklace, its creators try to persuade Queen Marie Antoinette to purchase it. Knowing its history, she declines.

Jeanne approaches debauched libertine Cardinal Louis de Rohan and introduces herself as a confidante of the Queen. For years the Cardinal has yearned to regain the Queen's favor and acquire the position of Prime Minister of France, but Antoinette refuses to talk to him as she heard rumors of him speaking ill of her mother, the Empress of Austria. When he is reassured by occultist Count Cagliostro that Jeanne is legitimate, he allows himself to be seduced by her promise to intervene on his behalf. He begins to correspond with the Queen and is unaware that his letters to her are intercepted and the Queen's responses are forgeries intended to manipulate him. The tone of the letters becomes very intimate. The Cardinal becomes more and more convinced that Marie Antoinette is in love with him, and he becomes ardently enamored of her.

Jeanne allegedly arranges a meeting between the two in the gardens of the Palace of Versailles. Portraying the Queen is Nicole Leguay d'Oliva, an actress bearing some resemblance to her. Heavily cloaked, with her face in the shadows, she agrees to forget their past disagreements. The Cardinal believes his indiscretions have been forgiven and he once again is in the Queen's good favor.

Jeanne advises the Cardinal the Queen has decided to purchase the necklace but, not wanting to offend the populace by openly buying such an expensive trinket, she wishes him to do so on her behalf, with a promise to reimburse him for the cost by the Feast of the Assumption. The Cardinal gladly agrees and presents the necklace to Rétaux de Villette, believing him to be an emissary from the Queen. Nicholas sells some of the diamonds, and Jeanne uses the profits to buy her family home.

The Cardinal begins to panic when Jeanne disappears and his correspondence with the Queen comes to an abrupt end. Nicholas is almost arrested for selling without proper certification, but he escapes. Jeanne advises him to not sell any more diamonds in Paris. She sends correspondence to the jewelers, saying that Marie Antoinette is no longer interested in the necklace and they must ask the Cardinal for reimbursement. However, Minister Breteuil comes upon an anxious Boehmer on his way to the Cardinal's estate. The Cardinal is invited to visit the palace on the Feast of the Assumption, at which time he assumes he will be repaid in full and named Prime Minister. Instead, King Louis XVI, who has been made aware of his machinations by Minister Breteuil, has him imprisoned in the Bastille. Soon to follow are everyone else involved in the plot, excluding Nicholas who fled to the border and into Austria. A trial finds the Cardinal, Count Cagliostro, and Nicole Leguay d'Oliva innocent of all charges. Rétaux de Villette is found guilty and banished from France. Jeanne is found guilty, whipped and branded before being imprisoned; she later escapes to London where she publishes her memoirs and regales the locals with her tales. Eventually, Marie Antoinette, assumed to be a key player in the affair by an increasingly angry and restless populace, meets her fate at the guillotine. Via an epilogue, Breteuil explains that Jeanne never returned to France as she died after falling from her hotel room window and was rumored to have been killed by Royalists.

== Cast ==
- Hilary Swank as Jeanne de Saint-Rémy de Valois
  - Hayden Panettiere as Young Jeanne de Saint-Rémy de Valois
- Jonathan Pryce as Cardinal Louis de Rohan
- Christopher Walken as Count Cagliostro
- Simon Baker as Rétaux de Villette
- Adrien Brody as Nicholas de la Motte
- Joely Richardson as Marie Antoinette
- Brian Cox as Baron de Breteuil/Narrator
- Simon Shackleton as King Louis XVI
- Hermione Gulliford as Nicole Leguay d'Oliva

== Production ==
=== Filming ===
The filming locations included the Palace of Versailles, Vaux-le-Vicomte, Alincourt, Compiègne, and Paris in France, and St. Barbara Church, Lednice, and Valtice in the Czech Republic. Interiors were filmed at the Barrandov Studios in Prague.

=== Music ===
The soundtrack included "Movement I: Mercy" by Alanis Morissette and Jonathan Elias, "Le Réjouissance - Allegro" and "Allegro from Sonata" by Georg Friedrich Händel, "Beatus vir" by Claudio Monteverdi, "The Four Seasons, Summer - First Movement" by Antonio Vivaldi, "Aire A6 in G Minor" by William Lawes, "Exsultate, Jubilate", and "Requiem Aeternam, Dies Irae" by Wolfgang Amadeus Mozart, and "Heidenröslein" by Franz Schubert.

== Historicity ==
- In the film, it is shown that Jeanne and her family were rich and had a family estate. In reality, Jeanne and her family were very poor, living in the slums of Paris.
- The film portrays Jeanne as a member of the House of Valois. In reality, she was a member of an illegitimate branch of the family, the house of Valois-Saint-Remy, descended from Henry de Saint Rémy, an illegitimate son of Henry II.
- Jeanne had two siblings; an older brother, Jacques, and a younger sister Marie-Anne. In a deleted scene, Jeanne is shown with her unnamed baby brother.
- According to her memoirs, Jeanne's father was the son of a minor nobleman. Her father was deep in debt and sold off the family property when Jeanne was young. There is no mention of him being a reformist, as portrayed in the film. He tried to regain his wealth when the family moved to Paris, but he died later and Jeanne's mother ran away, leaving her children to beg on the streets. Jeanne and her family were seen as no threat to the current monarchy.
- In the film, Marie Antoinette explains that Madame du Barry, Louis XV's mistress was recently banished from the French court. In fact, du Barry was banished from Versailles in 1774 shortly before the king died from smallpox, and the necklace was presented to Marie Antoinette in 1778, and again in 1781, but she refused the necklace both times.
- Jeanne was a con artist who sought to use the necklace to gain wealth, power, and possibly royal patronage. In the film, Jeanne used the diamonds as profit to buy her family estate.
- Nicholas de la Motte actually sold the diamonds in London. He did not sell any in Paris.
- Jeanne did escape to London, disguised as a boy, where she died from falling from a hotel window in 1791. Some speculate that she was trying to hide from tax collectors, while others say it was an act of revenge from French royalists.
- Count Cagliostro left France for England after he was acquitted. He later went to Rome, where he was accused and imprisoned for being a forger. He died at the Fortress of San Leo in 1795.
- Cardinal de Rohan kept the forged letters. When he was arrested, he presented the letters and the sales contract to the king, the queen, the Minister of the Court, and the Keeper of the Seals. The king furiously pointed out the forged signature "Marie Antoinette de France" and stated that royalty do not use surnames. In the film, de Rohan had the letters burned.
- Cardinal de Rohan's acquittal received popular enthusiasm as a victory over the royal court, particularly the Queen. He was expelled from his position as grand almoner and he exiled himself to his Chaise-Dieu. After the revolution, he left for his bishopric at Strasbourg in Alsace. He died in Ettenheim in 1803.

== Reception ==
=== Critical reception ===
On the review aggregator website Rotten Tomatoes, 15% of 62 critics' reviews are positive, with an average rating of 3.8/10. The website's consensus reads: "A film about court intrigue, The Affair of the Necklace turns out to be more dull than juicy. Swank seems flat and miscast in the central role of Jeanne." Metacritic, which uses a weighted average, assigned the film a score of 42 out of 100, based on 22 critics, indicating "mixed or average" reviews.

Roger Ebert of the Chicago Sun-Times gave it 2 out of 4 and wrote: "The storytelling is hopelessly compromised by the movie's decision to sympathize with Jeanne. We can admire someone for daring to do the audacious or pity someone for recklessly doing something stupid, but when a character commits an act of stupid audacity, the admiration and pity cancel each other, and we are left only with the possibility of farce."

Paul Clinton of CNN praised Hilary Swank and Charles Shyer's contributions to the film, writing, "Shyer is known for such lightweight comedies as Baby Boom (1987) and Father of the Bride (1991), but he's made a major change with this lavish period piece," and on the casting of Swank, he said, "Her graphic portrayal of Brandon Teena in Boys Don't Cry (1999) gave no hint as to whether or not she could pull off [an] 18th-century drama complete with feathered hats and tight corsets. She can."

Kevin Thomas of the Los Angeles Times wrote, "Shyer and Sweet bring consistent clarity and ever-increasing depth to the playing out of Jeanne's bold scheming and single-minded resolve; a tone of brisk wit gives way effortlessly to poignancy and ultimately tragedy."

Richard Roeper found the film to be very entertaining and was willing to overlook the script's historical liberties, stating "I'm sure that it's sort of a 'Fractured Fairy Tale' version of the real events that happened, but the fact that it was inspired by real-life events made me enjoy it all the more."

=== Accolades ===
Award	Category	Recipients	Result	Ref.
Academy Awards	Best Costume Design	Milena Canonero	Nominated	
Golden Satellite Awards	Best Costume Design	Milena Canonero	Nominated	
