= Jeanne de Valois-Saint-Rémy =

French noblewoman and con artist (1756–1791)

Jeanne de la Motte
- Comtesse de la Motte (self-proclaimed)
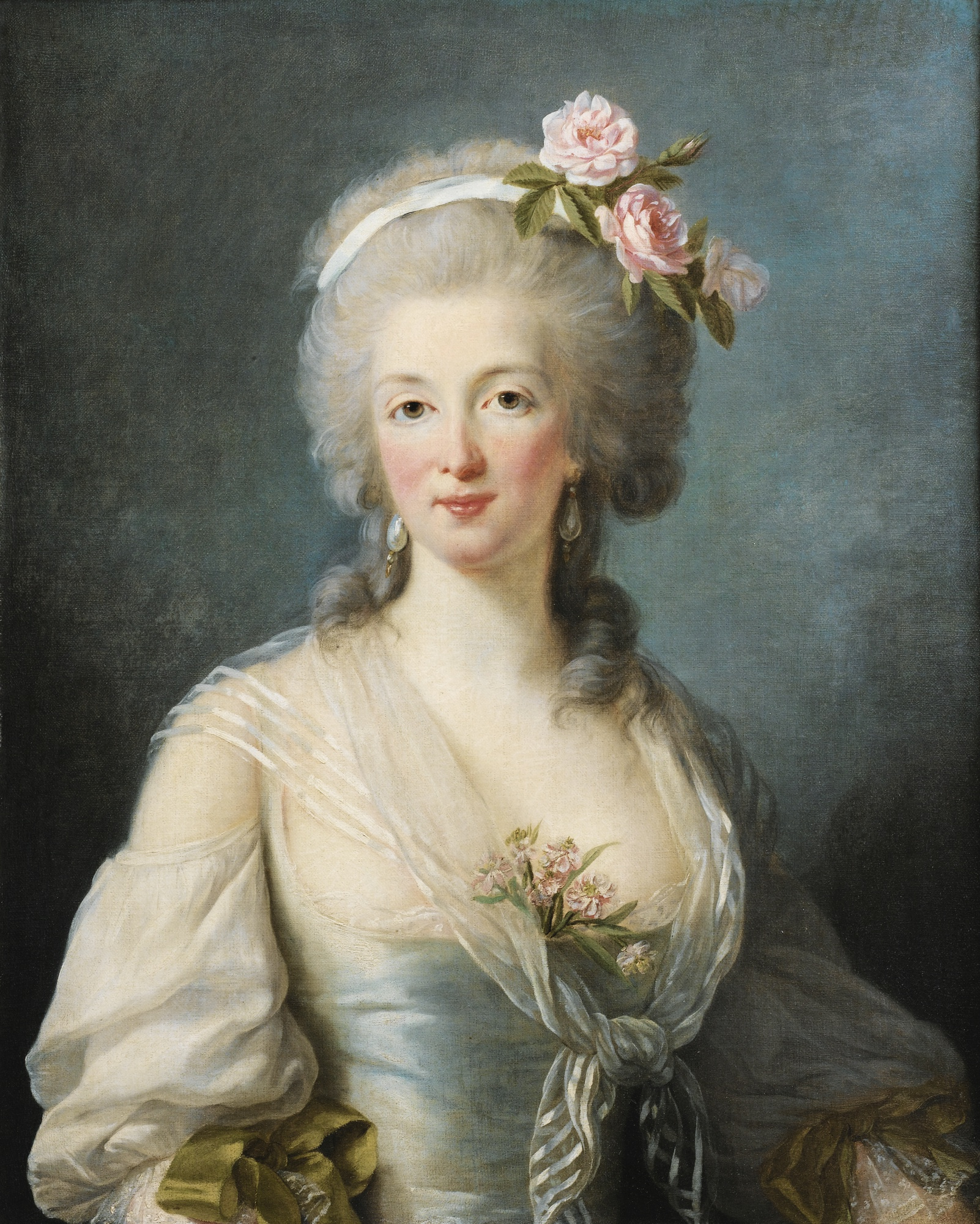
- Portrait of Jeanne de la Motte by Élisabeth Vigée Le Brun
- Born: Jeanne de Saint-Rémy de Luz de Valois; 22 July 1756; Fontette, Aube, France
- Died: 23 August 1791 (aged 35); London, United Kingdom
- Buried: St. Mary's Churchyard, Lambeth, London, United Kingdom
- Spouse: Nicholas de la Motte (m. 1780)

Jeanne de Valois-Saint-Rémy, self-proclaimed "Comtesse de la Motte" (22 July 1756 – 23 August 1791), was a French noblewoman, notorious adventuress and a thief; she was married to Nicholas de la Motte, whose family's claim to nobility was dubious. She herself was an impoverished descendant of the Valois royal family through an illegitimate son of King Henry II. She has been known for her prominent role in the Affair of the Diamond Necklace, one of many scandals that led to the French Revolution and helped to destroy the monarchy of France.

== Early years and marriage ==
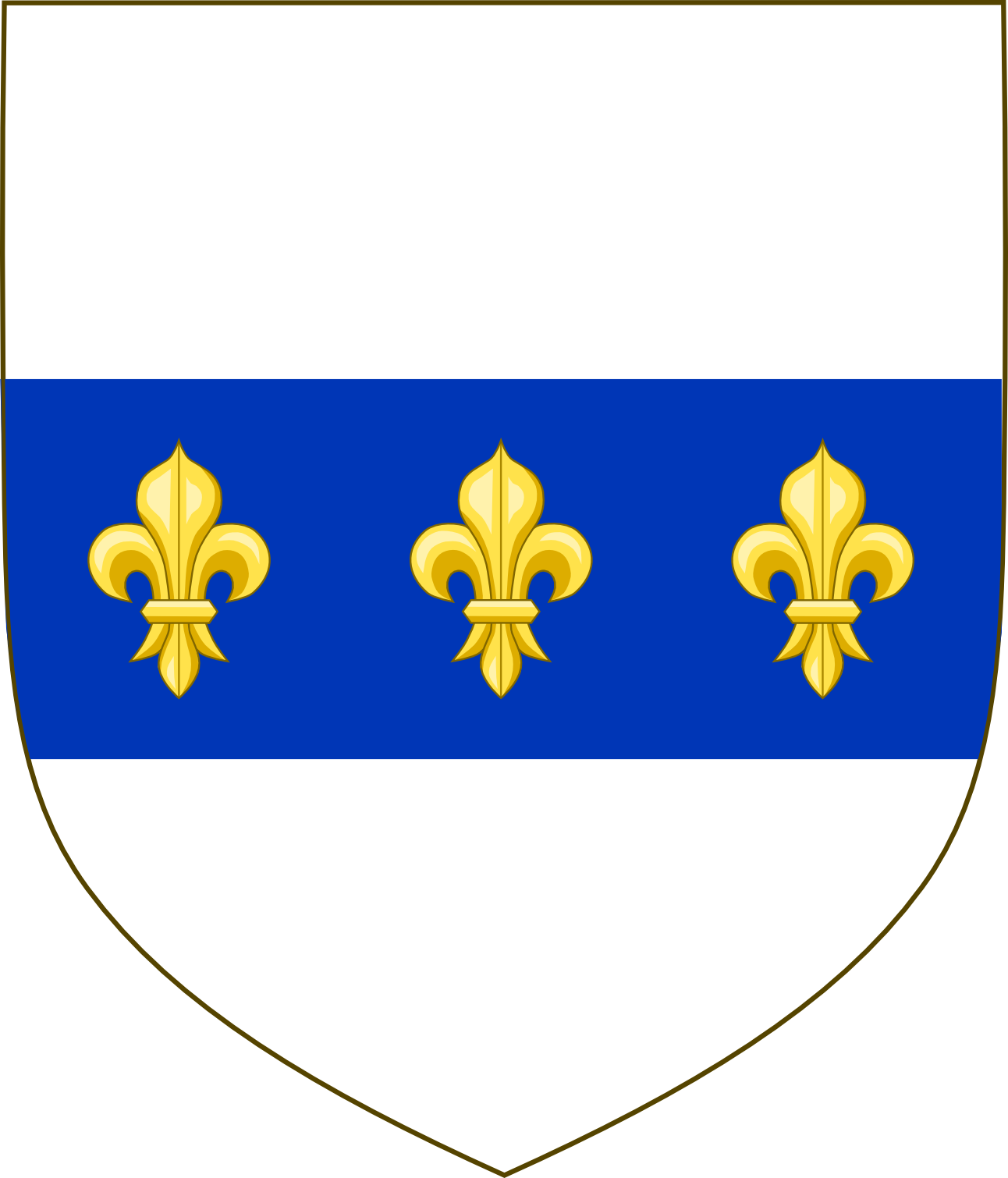
Coat of Arms of Valois de Saint-Rémy family

Jeanne de Saint-Rémy de Luz de Valois was born on 22 July 1756 in Fontette (northeastern France near Bar-sur-Aube) to a family in a financially precarious position. Her father, Jacques I de Saint-Rémy, Baron de Saint-Rémy, Seigneur de Luze (1717–1762), was a direct male-line descendant of Henri de Valois, Count of Saint-Rémy, Baron de Fontette (1557–1621), an illegitimate son of King Henry II by his mistress, Nicole de Savigny; despite having royal blood of the House of Valois, Jacques was known as a drunkard and to live from expedients. Her mother was Marie Jossel (1726–1783), a court servant girl, daughter of Pierre Jossel and Françoise Pitois, whom Jacques married in Langres in 1755, four years after the birth of their first son Jacques (b. 1751) and two years after the birth of their second son Joseph (b. 1753).

Jeanne was the third of six children. Three of Jacques de Valois de Saint-Rémy and Marie Jossel's six children died in childhood: Joseph (9 March 1753 – 9 December 1753), Marie Marguerite Anne (17 February 1759 – 23 May 1767) and Jean (5 March 1760 – 9 March 1760). The three surviving de Valois de Saint-Rémy children, Jacques II (25 July 1751 – 1785), Jeanne, and Marie-Anne (2 October 1757 – 28 April 1836) were neglected, went barefoot, tended the cows, and often found it necessary to beg for food. According to Count Beugnot as written in his Mémoires, they were rescued by his father and the abbot of Langres. According to another source, the family moved to Boulogne near Paris where a priest and one of his rich parishioners, Madame de Boulainvilliers, took care of them. Her elder brother, Jacques II de Saint-Rémy, Baron de Valois (1751–1787), became a Lieutenant of the King's ships, commander of a frigate and a Knight of the Order of Saint Louis. He never married, nor had children and died on military duty on Saint-Louis Island. Her younger sister Marie-Anne de Saint-Rémy (1757-1836) went back to religious life. She became a canoness and lived in Germany, where she died in 1836. Of the three siblings, Jeanne would be the only one to achieve notoriety. None of the three Saint-Rémy children had any known living descendants.

In any case, their Valois ancestry was ascertained by a genealogist at Versailles, and as a result of legal dispositions set up to help children from impoverished noble families, Jacques was granted a yearly stipend of 1000 pounds and a post in a military academy; Jeanne and Marie-Anne went to a boarding school in Passy and were given a stipend of 900 pounds. They were supposed to become nuns in the Longchamps monastery, but instead chose to go back to Bar-sur-Aube where they lived with the Surmont family. On 6 June 1780, Jeanne married Marc-Antoine-Nicolas de la Motte, Surmont's nephew and an officer of the gendarmes. At the time of her wedding, Jeanne was heavily pregnant; only one month later (7 July) her newborn twins were baptized as Jean-Baptiste de la Motte (b. 6 July 1780) and Nicolas-Marc de la Motte (b. 6 July 1780). Both children lived only a few days.

While the de la Motte family's claim to nobility was dubious, both husband and wife assumed the title Comte and Comtesse de La Motte Valois.

== Affair of the Diamond Necklace ==
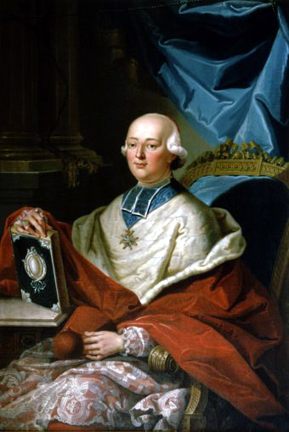
Cardinal Prince Louis de Rohan

When it became clear that Nicolas was unable to meet the couple's financial needs to maintain them in the extravagant style that his wife avidly desired, Jeanne resolved to ask for a more generous pension from the royal family due to her royal blood. She decided to approach Queen Marie Antoinette, anticipating sympathetic reception based on commonality of gender. Jeanne therefore made frequent visits to Versailles in the hope of catching the Queen's attention. At that time, any ordinary citizen dressed in suitable attire could enter the palace and its gardens, and observe the royal family. Nevertheless, Marie-Antoinette had been told of Jeanne's questionable lifestyle and refused to meet her.

The marriage between Jeanne and her husband was unsuccessful although they continued to live together. Jeanne took a lover, Rétaux de Villette, a common gigolo and Nicolas's fellow officer in the gendarmerie. Around 1783, she met Cardinal Prince Louis de Rohan. Jeanne quickly became his mistress and confidante. As a result, she became aware that the Prince wanted nothing more than to win Marie Antoinette's approval. Nevertheless, the Queen shunned the Cardinal because he had attempted to thwart her marriage to Louis XVI and she was aware of his scandalous and venal lifestyle.

Jeanne was described as having been slender with small breasts; she had white skin, chestnut-brown hair, limpid blue eyes, and a "winning smile". The Abbé Georgel, Cardinal de Rohan's loyal servant, describes Jeanne as having "the wiles of a Circe." She obtained some money from the Cardinal, and a commission for her husband in the Comte d'Artois's bodyguard.

At the same time, the jeweler Charles Auguste Boehmer was trying to sell a particularly expensive and luxurious diamond necklace originally designed for Madame du Barry. He had invested a fortune into this piece of jewelry and had to sell it fast to avoid bankruptcy. He soon realized that only the King could possibly buy such an item, but Louis XVI and the Queen refused the necklace.

Jeanne, with the active help of her husband and de Villette, concocted a plan to use this situation to their financial advantage. Rétaux de Villette was a master forger and wrote letters from 'the Queen' to the "comtesse". In the fake letters, the Queen stated that she wanted the necklace, but was aware of the reluctance of the King to buy it due to the current dismal financial situation of the country. She hoped that the Cardinal could lend her the money as a secret favor. Jeanne de la Motte was named as the Queen's agent. The Cardinal believed these letters to be authentic and agreed to buy the necklace for the Queen. The Cardinal knew very well that the Queen never met Jeanne in public, but believed that she was her trusted agent due to a secret liaison. In fact, in August 1784 in the gardens of the Palace of Versailles, a late night rendezvous was arranged, where the Cardinal met 'the Queen' (in reality a prostitute who resembled her, called Nicole le Guay d'Oliva) and received forgiveness. The jeweler was contacted and asked to bring the necklace.

The necklace was given to Jeanne de la Motte to pass on to the Queen. Her husband promptly began selling the diamonds in Paris and London. The affair came to light only when the Cardinal was arrested. Also soon arrested were Jeanne de la Motte, Rétaux de Villette, Nicole d'Oliva, and Count Cagliostro, a self-proclaimed holy man of whom the Cardinal was a patron, and who Jeanne accused of being the one who persuaded the Cardinal to purchase the necklace. "Comte" Nicholas de la Motte stayed in London.

While they were not directly implicated and could have tried the swindlers without publicity, the King and the Queen insisted on a public trial to defend their honor.

Nevertheless, the trial actually had the opposite effect and destroyed the reputation of the Queen, because the public saw her as the guilty party. The Cardinal was found not guilty and acquitted. King Louis XVI promptly had him exiled to one of the Cardinal's own properties in southern France. Rétaux de Villette was found guilty of forgery and exiled. Nicole d'Oliva was acquitted. Count Cagliostro, though acquitted, was exiled from France by order of the King. Jeanne de la Motte was found guilty and sentenced to be whipped, branded and imprisoned. The public sympathized with her. She was condemned to life imprisonment in the Salpêtrière, but soon escaped disguised as a boy.

== Escape to London and accidental death ==
Jeanne made her way to London, where in 1789 she published her memoirs entitled Mémoires Justificatifs de la Comtesse de Valois de La Motte, which attempted to justify her actions while casting blame upon Marie Antoinette.

Jeanne died in London as a result of injuries sustained after falling from her hotel room window, while hiding from debt collectors. A contemporary report in The Times stated that she was found "terribly mangled, her left eye cut out – one of her arms and both her legs are broken." She died on 23 August 1791, two years before Marie Antoinette, who went to the guillotine in 1793. Jeanne is buried in St. Mary's Churchyard in Lambeth, London.

== The fates of her associates ==
The Cardinal survived the revolution and lived out his life in exile. Rétaux de Villette also lived, banished from France for life, his belongings forfeit to the king. He went to Venice where he published his memoirs, died in exile in Italy around the age of 39. Nicole d'Oliva faded into obscurity and died in a convent at Fontenay-sous-Bois in 1789 at age 28. Count Cagliostro was imprisoned by the Roman Inquisition and died in prison. Nicolas de la Motte returned to Paris after the Revolution. He held various posts and positions, largely due to the help of old friends, who were influential members of successive governments. La Motte later died in November 1831, around the age of 77.

== See also ==
- The Rose of Versailles, a manga by Riyoko Ikeda that had Jeanne as a major antagonist.
- The Affair of the Necklace, the historical drama movie starring Hilary Swank as Jeanne.

== Bibliography ==
- Dumas, Alexandre (1848). The Queen's Necklace.
- Castelot, André (1957). Queen of France: A Biography of Marie Antoinette. New York: Harper and Row Publishers. OCLC 401503.
- Cronin, Vincent (1974). Louis and Antoinette. New York: William Morrow and Company. ISBN 9780688003319.
- Haslip, Joan (1987). Marie Antoinette. New York: Weidenfeld and Nicolson. ISBN 9780297795674.
- Vizetelly, Henry (1867). The Story of the Diamond Necklace. London: Tinsley Brothers.
