= Marie Antoinette (1938 film) =

1938 film by W. S. Van Dyke

- Theatrical release poster
- Directed by: W. S. Van Dyke
- Screenplay by: Donald Ogden Stewart; Ernest Vajda; Claudine West; F. Scott Fitzgerald (uncredited); Talbot Jennings (uncredited dialogue)
- Based on: Marie Antoinette: The Portrait of an Average Woman; 1932 biography by Stefan Zweig
- Produced by: Hunt Stromberg
- Starring: Norma Shearer; Tyrone Power; John Barrymore; Robert Morley; Anita Louise; Joseph Schildkraut; Gladys George; Henry Stephenson
- Cinematography: William H. Daniels
- Edited by: Robert Kern
- Music by: Herbert Stothart
- Production company: Metro-Goldwyn-Mayer
- Distributed by: Loew's, Inc.
- Release date: July 8, 1938
- Running time: 150 minutes
- Country: United States
- Language: English
- Budget: $2,926,000
- Box office: $2,956,000 (worldwide rentals)

Marie Antoinette is a 1938 American historical drama film produced by Metro-Goldwyn-Mayer. It was directed by W. S. Van Dyke and starred Norma Shearer as Marie Antoinette. Based upon the 1932 biography of the ill-fated Queen of France by the Austrian writer Stefan Zweig, it had its Los Angeles premiere at the legendary Carthay Circle Theatre, where the landscaping was specially decorated for the event.

The film was the last project of Irving Thalberg who died in 1936 while it was in the planning stage. His widow, Norma Shearer, remained committed to the project even while her enthusiasm for her film career in general was waning following his death.

With a budget over two million dollars, it was one of the more expensive films of the 1930s, but also one of the bigger successes.

== Plot ==
In 1769 Vienna, Empress Maria Theresa of Austria tells her daughter Maria Antonia she is to marry the Dauphin Louis-Auguste. Marie is excited to become the future Queen of France but grows dismayed upon learning her husband is a shy man more at home with locksmithing than attending parties. After countless attempts to please him, Louis reveals he cannot produce heirs, prompting Marie to associate with the power-hungry Duc d'Orleans.

On her second wedding anniversary, Madame du Barry, King Louis XV's mistress, gifts Marie with an empty cradle and a poem critical of her inability to produce an heir. Despite Marie's distress, Louis proves to be too weak to stand up to his grandfather. Sometime later, Marie meets Swedish Count Axel Fersen at a gaming house, whereupon she wagers and loses an expensive necklace. Count Mercy, the Austrian ambassador, scolds her for her wanton behaviour, but she pays him little heed.

At the command of the King, Marie hosts a ball in an attempt to make amends with du Barry and please Count Mercy. However, the attempt fails when du Barry draws attention to Louis's absence, and Marie responds with cutting references to du Barry's past. The King decides to annul the marriage, prompting Louis to defend Marie. Meanwhile, Marie flees to Count Mercy's residence after learning she is to be sent back to Austria. While there, she reunites with Fersen, who professes his love for her.

Realising she too has fallen in love with Fersen, Marie goes to tell Louis but learns she cannot leave him as the King is dying of smallpox and Louis himself is still fond of her. She agrees to remain, and they ascend to the throne following the King's death. Despite Marie's attempts to continue their relationship, Fersen refuses to risk ruining her reputation and tells her to fulfill her duties as France's Queen. She goes on to give birth to daughter Marie Thérèse and son Louis Charles.

Years later, when the Dauphin has grown into a young boy, peasants throw stones at Marie's carriage while she is taking her children for a drive. She is shocked at the intense dislike displayed by the people of France. She blames d'Orleans for inciting them. Marie refuses to purchase a jeweller's expensive and elaborate necklace. Still, she is framed by court insiders plotting to acquire the necklace for themselves, and the Affair of the Diamond Necklace erupts. Marie is outraged, but d'Orleans tells the royal couple to abdicate the throne in favour of the Dauphin under the regency of d'Orleans.

The French Revolution comes, and the royal family is taken prisoner. Fersen returns with a plan of escape, but when the Dauphin tells a guard that his father is a locksmith, the King is recognised and arrested after a former priest at Versailles identifies him. The King is put on trial and sentenced to death and spends his last night with his family, his children not realising this is the last night they will spend with their father. Marie is heartbroken but is then separated from her children, put on trial, and condemned to death. The Dauphin, too young to understand what is going on around him, is forced to testify against his mother. The night before she is executed, Fersen visits her in prison and they pledge their love to each other, with Marie telling him that she will never say goodbye. The next morning she goes bravely to her execution, which Fersen witnesses from a distance. As Marie gazes at the guillotine she thinks back to the day her mother told her that she was to become the future queen of France, and how excited she was at the prospect.

== Cast ==
- Norma Shearer as Marie Antoinette
- Tyrone Power as Count Axel von Fersen
- John Barrymore as King Louis XV
- Robert Morley as King Louis XVI
- Anita Louise as Princesse de Lamballe
- Joseph Schildkraut as Duc d’Orléans
- Gladys George as Madame du Barry
- Henry Stephenson as Count Mercey
- Cora Witherspoon as Countess De Noailles
- Barnett Parker as Cardinal de Rohan (referred to, and credited as "Prince de Rohan")
- Reginald Gardiner as Comte d'Artois
- Henry Daniell as La Motte
- Leonard Penn as Toulan
- Albert Van Dekker as Comte de Provence
- Alma Kruger as Empress Maria Theresa
- Joseph Calleia as Drouet
- George Meeker as Robespierre
- Scotty Beckett as Louis-Charles de France (credited as "The Dauphin")
- Marilyn Knowlden as Princesse Thérèse
- Harry Davenport as Monsieur de Cosse (uncredited)
- Nigel De Brulier as Archbishop (uncredited)
- Walter Walker as Benjamin Franklin (uncredited)
- Rafaela Ottiano as Louise (uncredited)
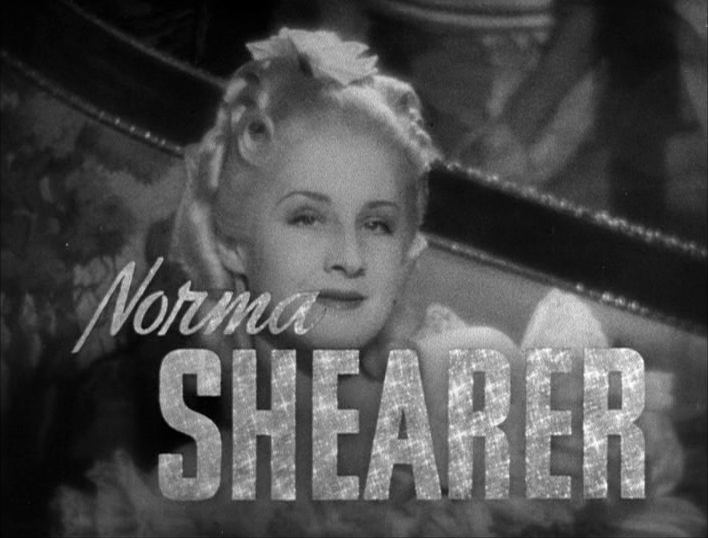
Norma Shearer

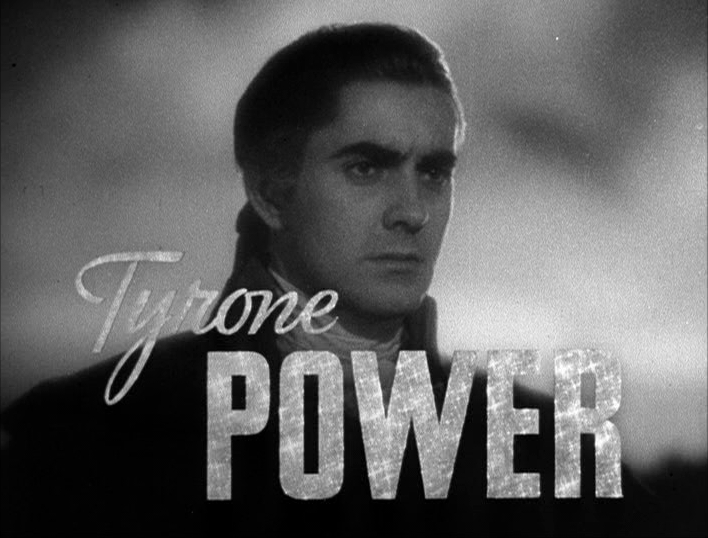
Tyrone Power

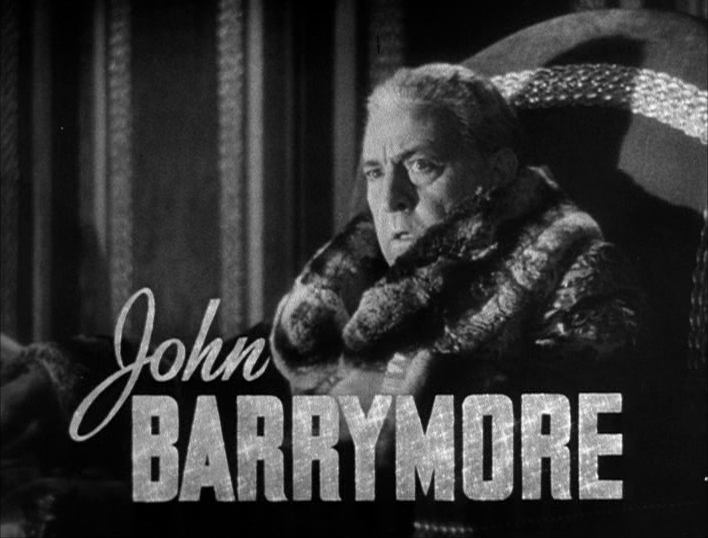
John Barrymore

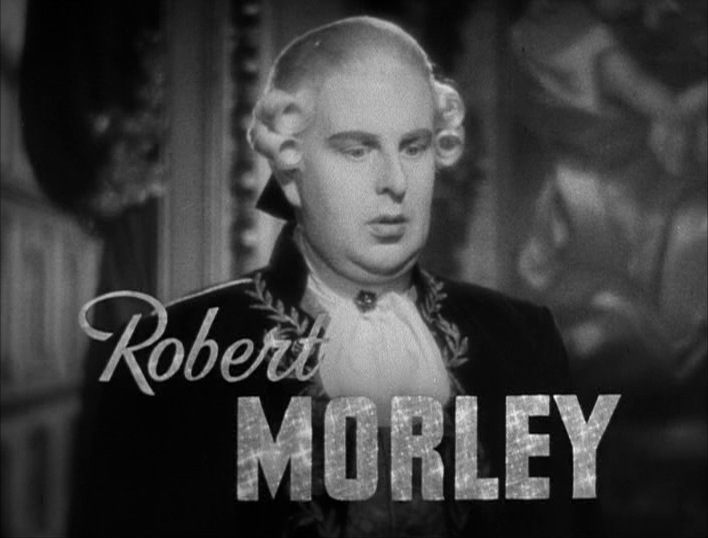
Robert Morley

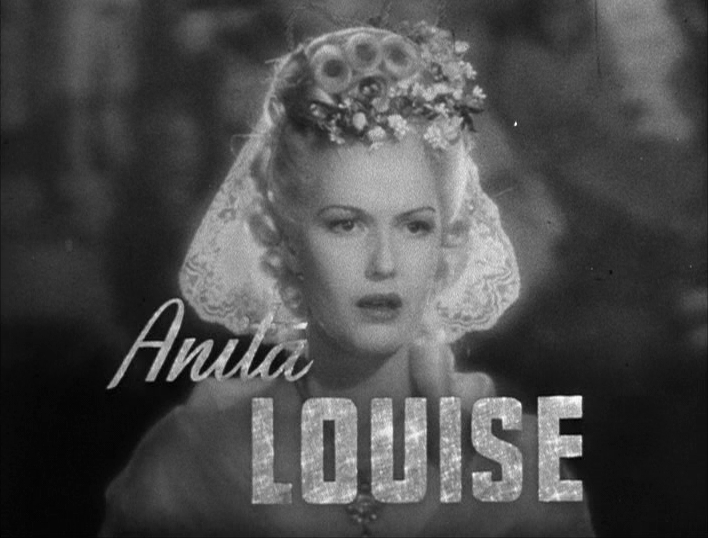
Anita Louise

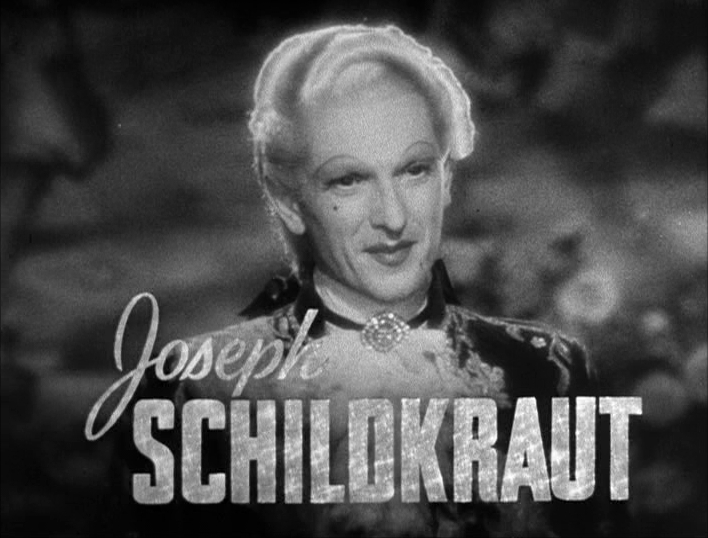
Joseph Schildkraut

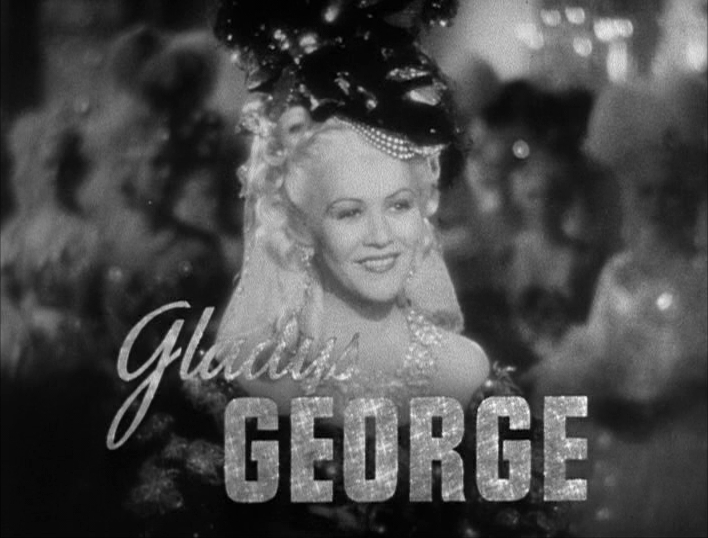
Gladys George

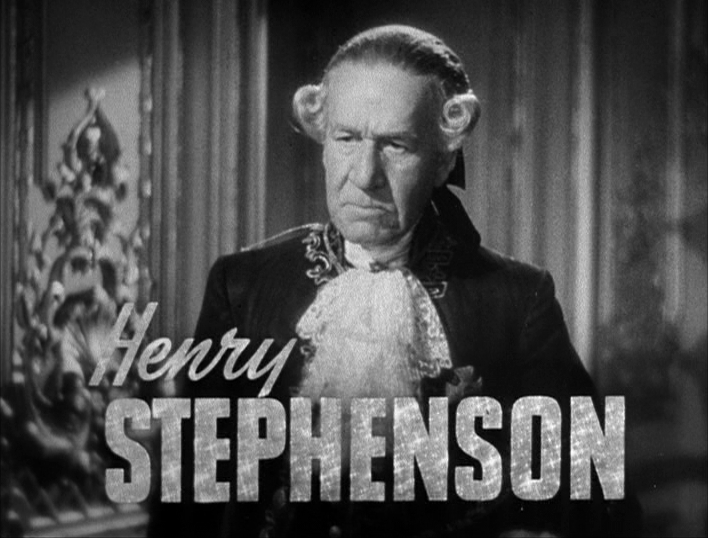
Henry Stephenson

== Background ==
William Randolph Hearst originally planned this film as a vehicle for Marion Davies as early as 1933. However, a clash with Louis B. Mayer after the failure of her film Operator 13 led to the couple switching to neighboring Warner Bros.

Norma Shearer was the wife of MGM studio head Irving Thalberg when this project was greenlit sometime before his death in 1936. This was reportedly Shearer's favorite role.

Originally to be directed by Sidney Franklin, the job was given to W.S. Van Dyke. Irving Thalberg originally planned for Charles Laughton to play the role of Louis XVI, but Laughton, after lengthy deliberations, finally declined.

=== Costumes and set designs ===
The film boasted thousands of expensive costumes and lavish set design. The costumes created for the film are among the most expensive in film history. Costume designer Adrian visited France and Austria in 1937 to research the period. While there he purchased vast quantities of antique materials, French lace, and period accessories for use in the film. He studied the paintings of Marie Antoinette, even using a microscope on them, so that the embroidery could be identical. Fabrics were specially woven and subsequently embroidered with stitches sometimes too fine to be seen with the naked eye. The studio raged at the amount of money being spent on costumes for the film. The attention to detail was extreme, from the framework to hair. Some gowns were extremely heavy due to the amount of embroidery, fabric and precious stones used in their creation. Ms. Shearer's gowns alone had the combined weight of over 1,768 pounds, the heaviest being the 108 pound wedding dress created using hundreds of yards of white silk satin hand embroidered in gilt thread. Originally slated to be shot in Technicolor, many of the gowns were specially dyed. The fur trim on one of Ms. Shearer's capes was therefore dyed the exact shade of her eyes.

The elaborate costumes were subsequently reused multiple times in other period films to offset the cost of their creation. Many have survived and exist in both museum and private costume collections internationally.

The ballroom at Versailles was built to be twice as large as the original to give the ball sequences a grander scale. Genuine French furniture from the period was purchased and shipped to Hollywood, some of it thought to have originally been from Versailles. The budget was a then-enormous $2.9 million. After calculating the huge expense of costume and set design, plans to render the film in color were scrapped because of concerns that adding Technicolor would further inflate the budget.

== Reception ==
The film premiered on July 8, 1938, at the Carthay Circle Theatre in Los Angeles following a lavish outdoor red carpet ceremony for which the nearby lawns were transformed into an imitation of the gardens of the Palace of Versailles. The premiere, including the preparations of the grounds, is depicted in a short black-and-white newsreel film, Hollywood Goes to Town, produced by M-G-M.

According to MGM records Marie Antoinette took in $1,633,000 in theater rentals from the United States and Canada and an additional $1,323,000 from foreign rentals, but because of its enormous cost recorded a loss of $767,000.

== Home media ==
Sofia Coppola released her 2006 film version of the life of the queen at Versailles, causing Warner Bros. to release its 1938 vault version of Marie Antoinette on DVD. Extras are sparse, with two vintage shorts included on the disc: "Hollywood Goes to Town" provides a glimpse of the elaborate premiere for the movie, while a trailer is also included.

== Academy Award nominations ==
- Best Actress – Norma Shearer
- Best Supporting Actor – Robert Morley
- Best Art Direction – Cedric Gibbons
- Best Music, Original Score – Herbert Stothart
