= Nicole d'Oliva =

French prostitute and memoirist (1761–1789)

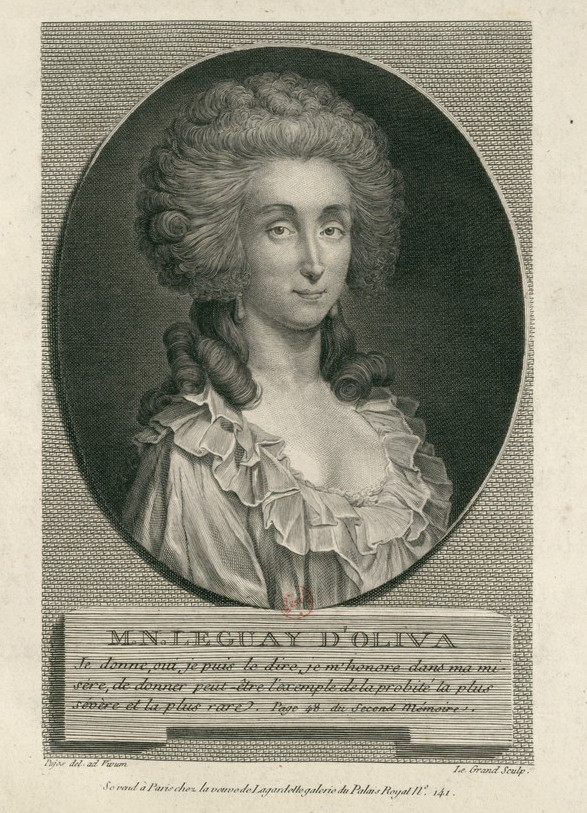
Nicole Le Guay

Marie Nicole Le Guay d'Oliva (Paris, September, 1761 – Fontenay-sous-Bois, 1789) was a French prostitute and memoirist. She is known in history as one of the participants of the famous fraud known as the Affair of the Diamond Necklace.

== Life ==
She was born in Paris as the daughter of Claude Le Guay and Marguerite David. She was orphaned early in life, and was forced to rely on prostitution to support herself. She called herself 'Baroness d'Oliva', and prostituted herself in the gardens of the Palais Royal in Paris.

In spring 1784, she was contacted by Nicholas de la Motte, husband of Jeanne de Valois-Saint-Rémy. She was hired by them to pose as queen Marie Antoinette in a late-night meeting with a man in the garden of Versailles. During the meeting, she was to deliver a few words, a rose, and a letter. The meeting was a crucial part of the fraud Affair of the Diamond Necklace: the man was Cardinal de Rohan, and the intent was to convince him that the queen was indeed involved in the affair. She had been chosen to perform the part because of her likeness to the queen, and was to be dressed in a white dress similar to that of the queen.

In summer 1785, the fraud was exposed in Paris. On 16 October 1785, Nicole d'Oliva was arrested in Brussels in the company of a man named Toussaint de Beausire. She was transferred to the Bastille, where she gave birth to a child. All of the accomplices were put on trial.

Nicole d'Oliva stated in her trial that she had not been aware of the fraud. She had participated in the famous meeting, but she was not aware of the purpose of it. As far as she knew, she had simply been hired to play an acting role. The court believed Nicole d'Oliva's statement, and she was the only person involved in the fraud who was freed in court besides Cardinal de Rohan.

After the trial, she had an affair with her defense lawyer. She died four years after the trial at age 28, as a guest in the Fontenay-sous-Bois convent.

== Memoirs ==
d'Oliva published her own memoirs after the trial: Mémoire pour la demoiselle le Guay d'Oliva, fille mineure, émancipée d'âge, accusée, contre M. le Procurer-général.
