= The Queen's Necklace =

1850 novel by Alexandre Dumas

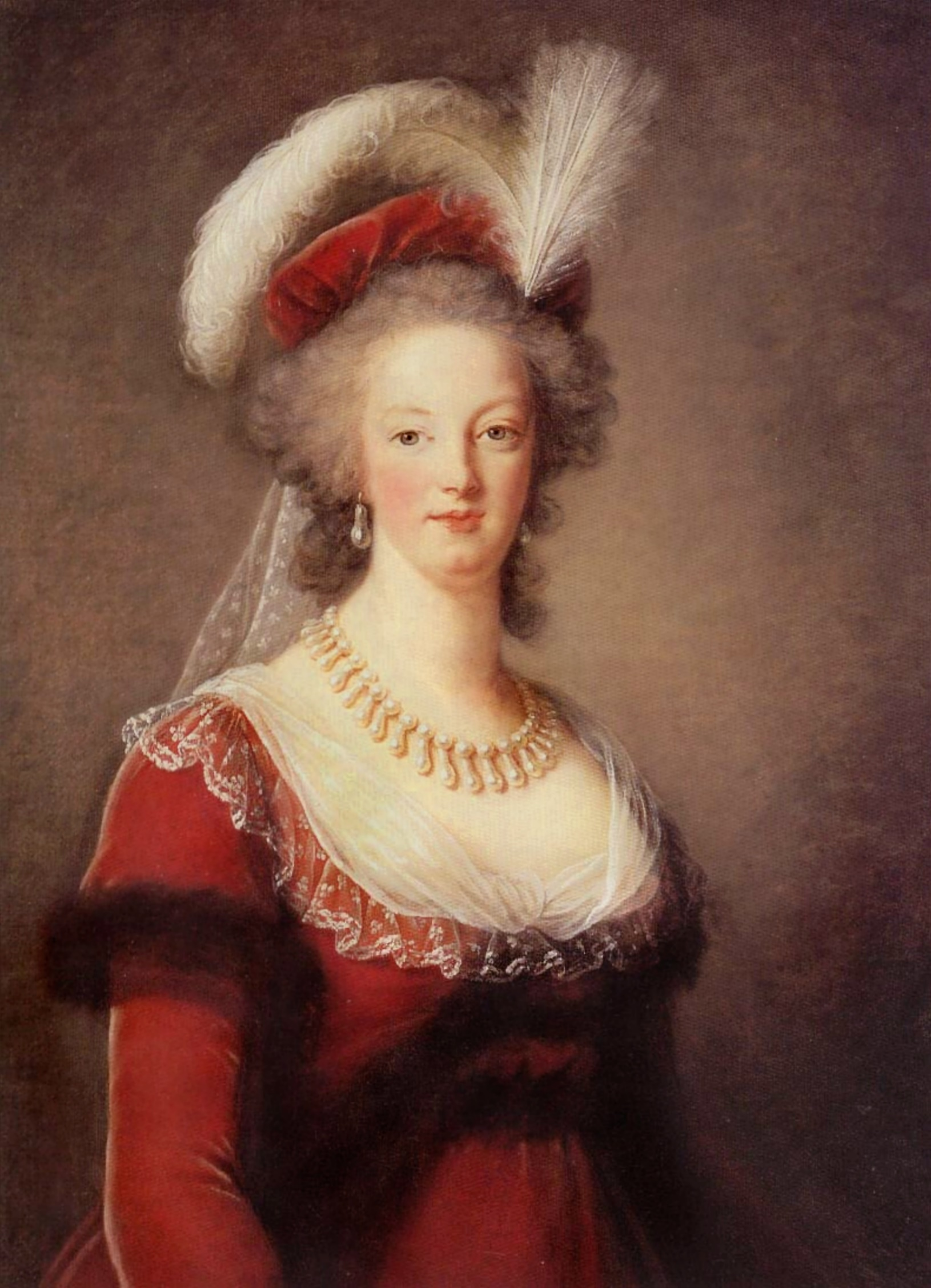
- Author: Alexandre Dumas in collaboration with Auguste Maquet
- Original title: Le Collier de la reine
- Language: French
- Genre: Historical novel
- Publication date: 1849- 1850 (serialised)
- Publication place: France
- Preceded by: Joseph Balsamo
- Followed by: Ange Pitou

The Queen's Necklace is a novel by Alexandre Dumas that was published in 1849 and 1850 (immediately following the French Revolution of 1848). It is loosely based on the Affair of the Diamond Necklace, an episode involving fraud and royal scandal that made headlines at the court of Louis XVI in the 1780s.

== The Novel ==
The novel first appeared in serialised form in La Presse. The story takes place between 1784 and 1785. It is the second in a series of four novels focused on the character of Alessandro Cagliostro, presented by Dumas as the man pulling all the strings of the affair.

== Sources ==
The first chapters of the novel, which feature a dinner hosted by the old Marshal of Richelieu, were inspired by a text by Jean-François de La Harpe called The Prophecy of Cazotte. In this passage, the Count of Cagliostro predicts for the various guests (Lapérouse, the Countess of Barry, Condorcet and Gustav III of Sweden, the count of Haga) the tragic end that awaits them and the execution of Louis XVI. This foreshadowing throws light on the tragic plot, as the reader already knows that the efforts of the protagonists, including the queen, to prove their innocence are doomed to failure.

- Mme Campan, Memoirs of the Private Life of Marie Antoinette, Baldwin, 1823.

== Adaptations ==
The plot of the novel was fully or partially included in adaptations for film and television, which also drew on the historical facts:

- Le Collier de la reine, a short, silent film, directed by Etienne Arnaud and Louis Feuillade, released in 1909;
- The Queen's Necklace, directed by Tony Lekain and Gaston Ravel, released in 1929;
- The Queen's Necklace, directed by Marcel L'Herbier, released in 1946;
- The Affair of the Necklace, directed by Charles Shyer, released in 2001, whose plot follows that of the Affair of the Diamond Necklace, but whose elements have been drawn from the novel by Alexandre Dumas.
