= Gaston Pierre de Lévis =

French aristocrat (1699–1757)

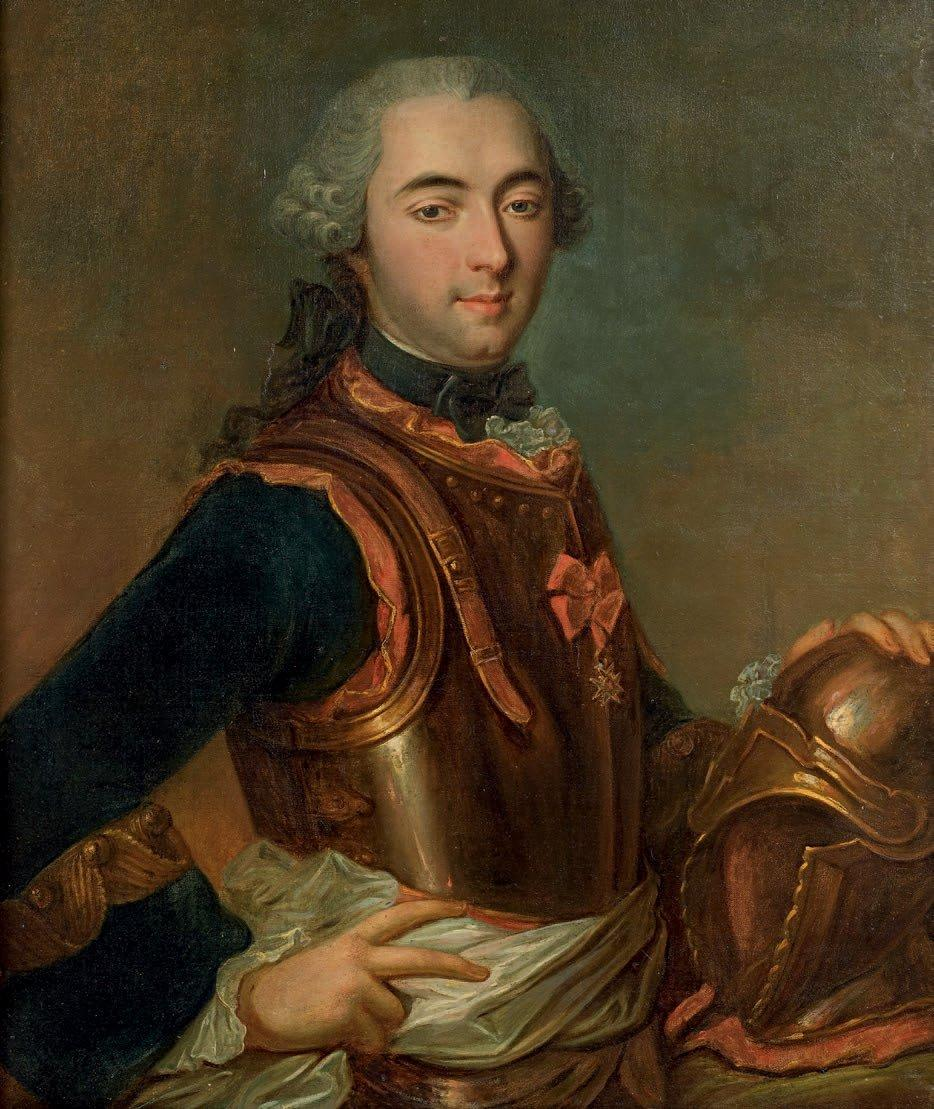
Gaston de Lévis, Duke of Mirepoix

Gaston-Pierre-Charles de Lévis-Lomagne, duc de Mirepoix (Belleville, 2 December 1699 – Montpellier, 24 September 1757), maréchal de France (1757) and Ambassador of Louis XV, was a French aristocrat.

== Biography ==
Lévis family arms

Gaston Pierre Charles de Lévis descended from the House of Lévis, an old noble family established in Languedoc as Seigneurs of Mirepoix, Ariège since the 11th century. They settled in Languedoc during the Albigensian Crusade.

He was the only son of Pierre-Louis de Lévis de Lomagne, Count of Terrides, later Marquis of Mirepoix, "Marshal of the Faith," and his wife, Anne-Gabrielle Olivier.

His cousin, François Gaston de Lévis, distinguished himself during the Seven Years' War in New France at the Battle of Sainte-Foy and, like him, became a Marshal of France.

=== Military and diplomatic career ===
Having lost his father at the age of two and his mother at eight, he was orphaned at a very young age.

In 1715, at the age of sixteen, he joined the King's Musketeers, and at nineteen, he obtained the rank of colonel of the Saintonge Infantry Regiment on 6 March 1719, then of the Marine Infantry Regiment on 10 March 1734, and on 1 August of the same year, he was promoted to brigadier.

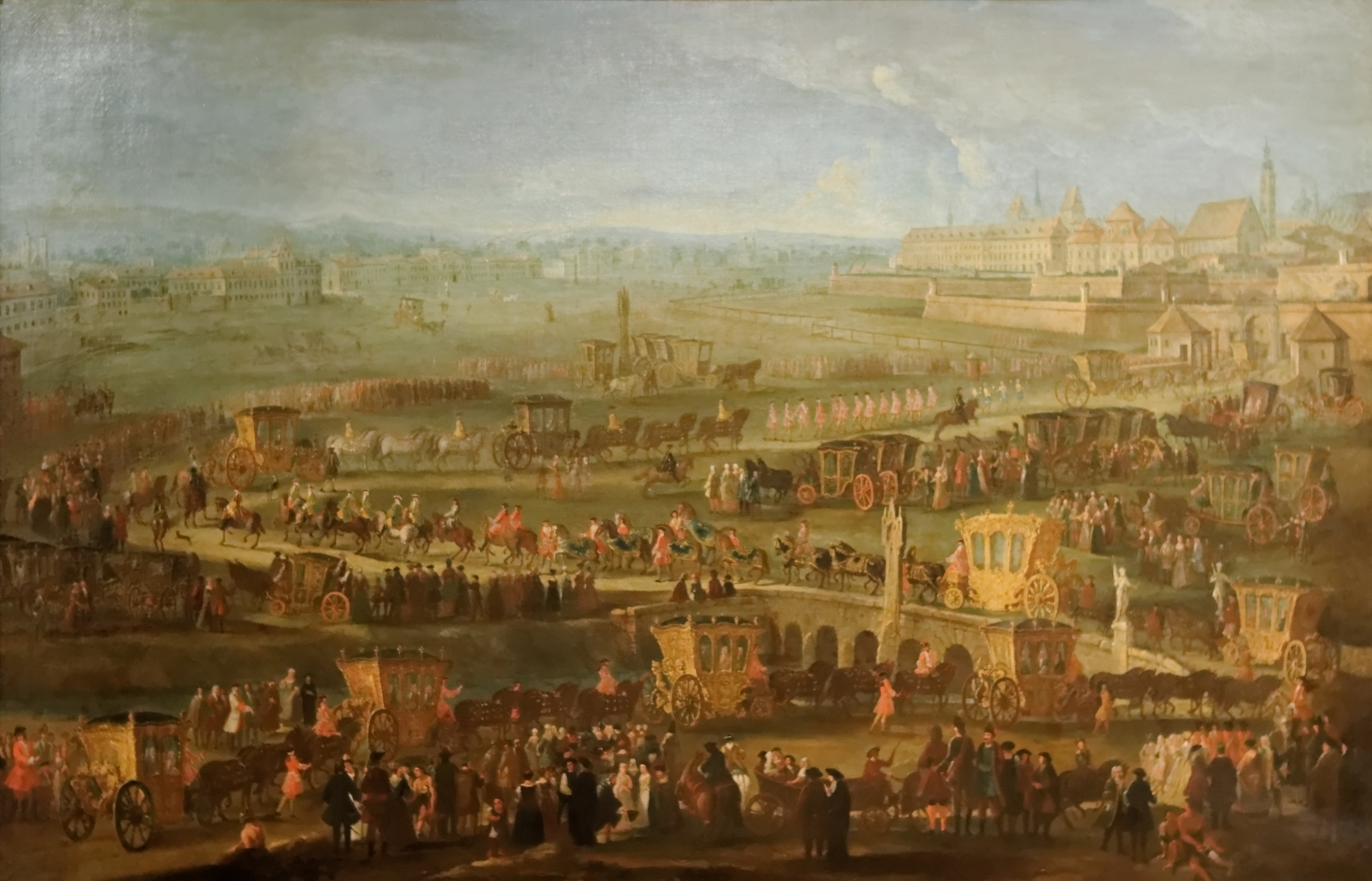
Entry of Ambassador de Mirepoix into Vienna on 12 October 1738

In 1735, during negotiations for the peace treaty between France and Austria after the War of the Polish Succession, it was decided to exchange ambassadors. In 1738, Mirepoix was appointed French ambassador and then minister plenipotentiary to the Emperor in Vienna. On 12 October, a few days before the signing of the peace treaty, he entered the city with a procession of 64 carriages. Through the remarkable negotiations he conducted, Mirepoix secured the Duchy of Lorraine for France (18 November 1738). The Duchy was then given to Stanisław Leszczyński, former King of Poland and father-in-law of Louis XV. This earned him the Order of the Holy Spirit, which he received on 2 February 1741.

He returned to France where the King appointed him brigadier general. During the War of the Austrian Succession, he participated in many battles, marching on Bohemia in 1742. He fought in the Battle of Lauffeld alongside Marshal de Saxe and took part in the victory at Mont Alban, where his conduct earned him the rank of lieutenant general in 1744. He fought in Provence, the County of Nice, and Italy in 1746. Appointed governor of Brouage in 1747, he then became Ambassador extraordinary to London between 1749 and 1755, where he tried unsuccessfully to negotiate with the British cabinet to avoid a confrontation between the two monarchies in New France.

He was named Duke of Mirepoix on 25 September 1751, both for his military talents and his diplomatic abilities. After his return from London in 1755, he was appointed Lieutenant-General and Governor of the Pays de Vivarais and Velay, the Diocese of Uzès and the Province of Languedoc. On 24 February 1757, he was made Marshal of France by King Louis XV. He died 7 months later in Montpellier.

=== Marriages ===
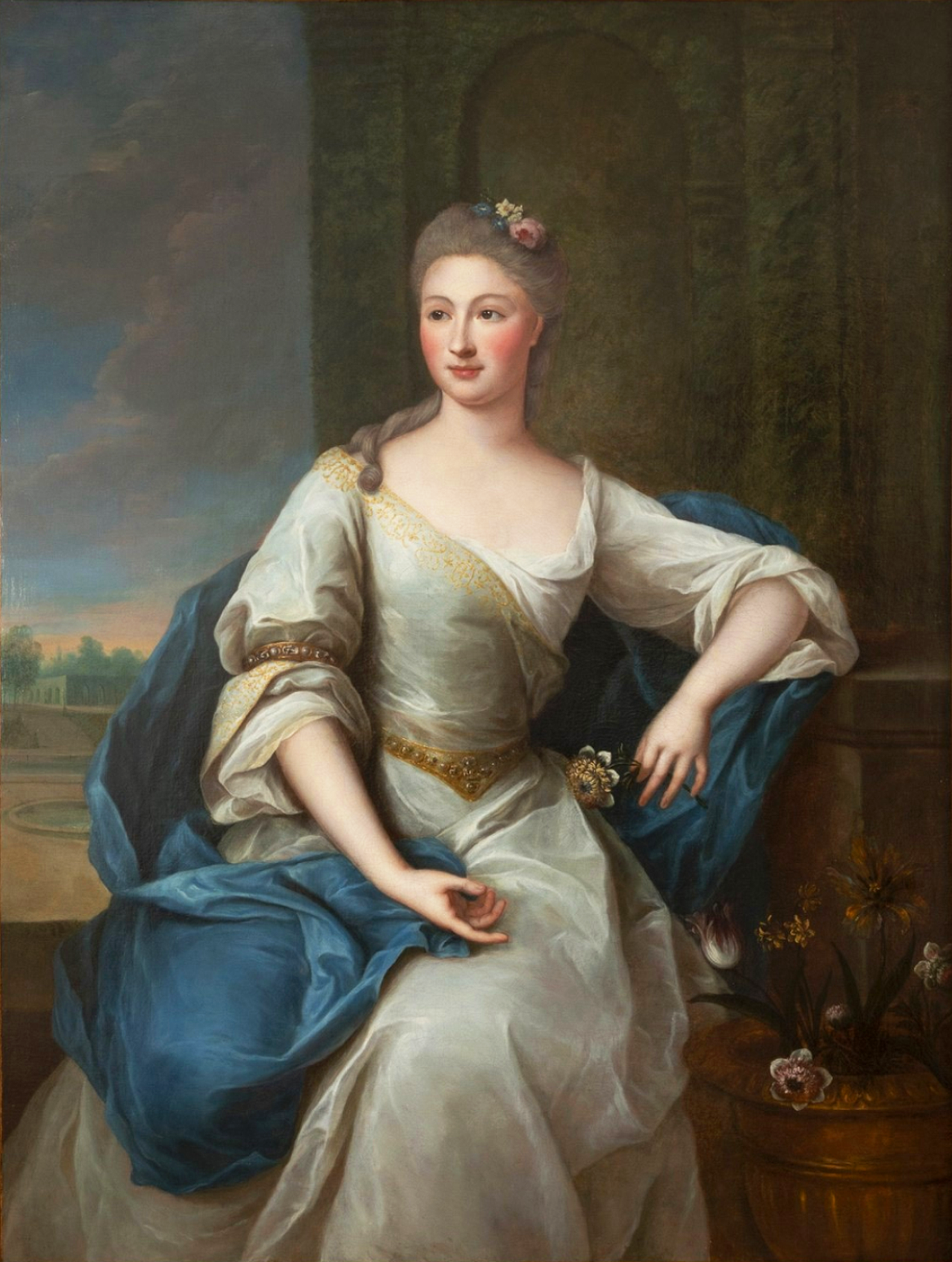
Painting probably of his second wife by Pierre Gobert

In 1733, he married Anne-Gabrielle-Henriette Bernard de Rieux, daughter of Gabriel Bernard, Count of Rieux (fr), President of the Parliament of Paris. She was the granddaughter of the financier Samuel Bernard and the historian and writer Henri de Boulainvilliers. She died in childbirth at the age of fifteen and a half, on 31 December 1736.

In 1739, he remarried Anne-Marguerite-Gabrielle de Beauveau-Craon (born in 1707), widow of Jacques-Henri de Lorraine, Prince of Lexing, daughter of Marc de Beauvau, 1st Prince of Craon, Grandee of Spain, and Anne Marguerite de Ligniville.

His second wife was a frequent visitor to the Court. Thanks to her husband's high position, she lived a lavish lifestyle and held court. Favored by Louis XV, she was part of his inner circle, and was a friend of Madame de Pompadour and later of Madame du Barry. Her cook invented a preparation based on chopped vegetables and spices, still known as Mirepoix today..

There were no children from these two unions.

According to Pierre Larousse (quoted in the Oxford Companion to Food), the unfortunate Duke of Mirepoix was "an incompetent and mediocre individual [...] who owed his vast fortune to the affection Louis XV felt toward his wife and who had but one claim to fame: he gave his name to a sauce made of all kinds of meat and a variety of seasonings".

== See also ==
- House of Lévis
- List of ambassadors of France to the Kingdom of Great Britain
