= Nicolas Mesnager =

French diplomat (1658–1714)

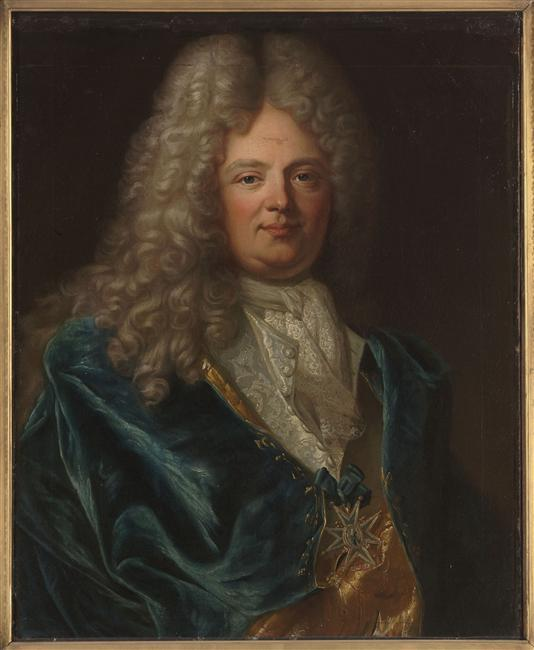
Count Nicolas Ménager

Nicolas Mesnager (or Le Mesnager or Ménager) (1658–1714) was a French diplomat.

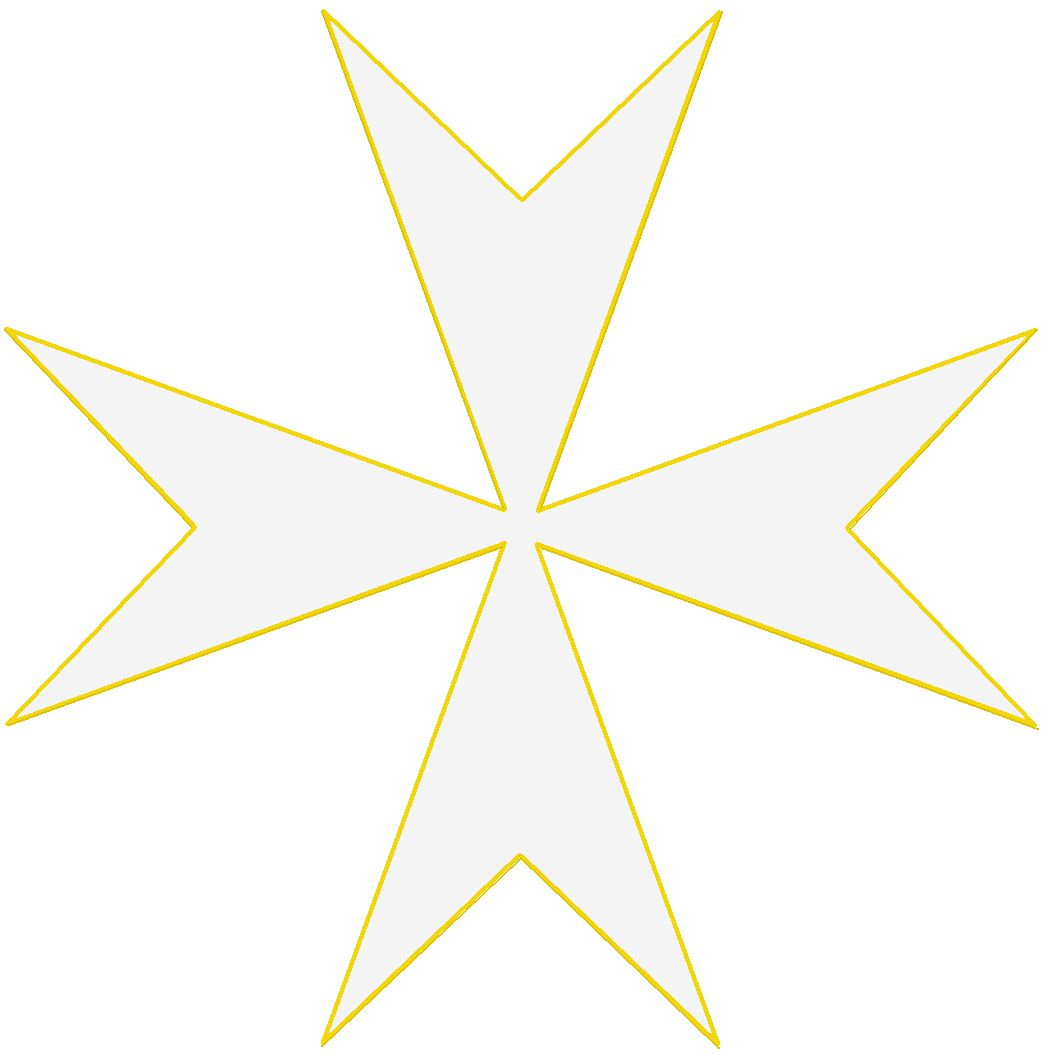
Breast Star of Knight of Malta

Le Mesnager belonged to a wealthy merchant family, forsaking a commercial career, to become a parliamentary lawyer for Rouen under the Ancient régime. In 1700 he was sent as Rouen's Advocate-Deputy to the Council of Commerce held in Paris convened to promote trade agreements for France. At Versailles he made his mark, thereafter being nominated to go on three missions to Spain, between the years 1704 and 1705, to negotiate financial arrangements. In Spain he was appointed harbourmaster of Cádiz and he helped improve trade with the Spanish colonies.

In August 1711 he was sent on a secret mission to London to detach Great Britain from its alliance against France, and succeeded in securing the adoption of eight articles which formed the base of the later Treaty of Utrecht.

His negotiating and diplomacy skills were rewarded by his being one of the three French Plenipotentiaries deputed to Utrecht in January 1712, having the honour of signing the Treaty in the following year. His appointment as Ambassadeur was a form of recompense by King Louis XIV for Ménager's spending a fortune in diplomatic efforts; he was also awarded a Crown pension and created a Count (for life).

As a further show of recognition, he was offered a granddaughter of the Sun-King as wife; he married Louise-Emilie de Vautédard (1694–1719), an illegitimate daughter of Louis, Grand Dauphin of France (1661–1711).

A portrait of him by Hyacinthe Rigaud hangs at the Palace of Versailles.

Both Queen Anne of Great Britain and King Philip V of Spain granted Nicolas Ménager (comte de Saint-Jean) coats of arms.

== See also ==
- List of ambassadors of France to the Kingdom of Great Britain
