= Cahouët Affair =

1777 incident in France

The Affaire Cahouët, or Cahouët Affair, was an incident taking place in France in 1777, in which the socialite Victoire Cahouët de Villers managed to acquire large loans from people, notably the fermier général Loiseau de Béranger, by convincing them that she was a favorite and confidante of queen Marie Antoinette and thus would be certain to pay the money back. She was arrested and confined to the Bastille, from which she was released in 1778 and placed in a convent. While the incident showed several similarities to the famous Affair of the Diamond Necklace eight years later, it never attracted as much attention in written history as the latter.
