= Rétaux de Villette =

French prostitute

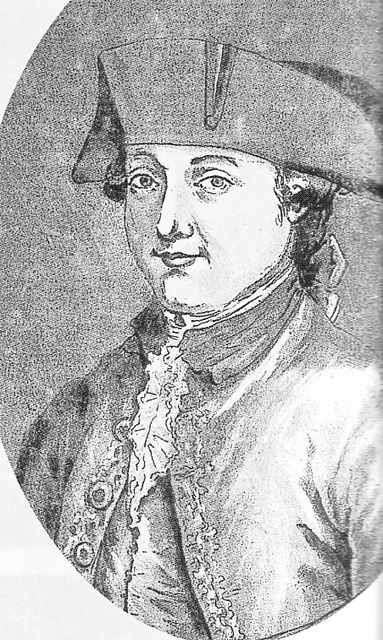
- Armand Gabriel Rétaux de Villette, c. 1793
- Born: Armand Gabriel Rétaux de Villette; 9 February 1754 nr. Lyon, Paris
- Died: 1797 (aged 42 or 43)
- Occupations: Procurer, forger, blackmailer, prostitute
- Known for: Affair of the diamond necklace

Armand Gabriel Rétaux de Villette (French pronunciation: [aʁmɑ̃ ɡabʁijɛl ʁeto də vilɛt]; 9 February 1754-1797) was a French procurer, forger, blackmailer and pimp. He participated in the famous "Affair of the Diamond Necklace".

== Early life ==
He was born near Lyon in 1754, the younger son of a minor aristocrat whose family lacked the financial resources to secure him a position suitable to his status in life. At a young age, Rétaux left home and enlisted in the army as an ordinary soldier. It is unknown how long he remained in military service or whether he was discharged honorably or deserted.

However, by 1778, at the age of 19, he was known to be living in Paris and representing himself as the ‘Comte‘ de Villette, a title that really belonged to his elder brother. While in Paris, Rétaux supported himself by recruiting young women to work as prostitutes for which he was paid a fee by brothel owners. It was during that time that Villette developed a talent for forgery. While plying his trade, he was known to forge letters of credit for sums of money greater than what was owed for his services. In addition to the nefarious activities, Villette occasionally resorted to blackmailing his clients.

== Affair of the Diamond Necklace ==
Through an intimate relationship with Jeanne de Saint-Rémy de Valois, the pair staged a scandal involving a diamond necklace. The notorious "Affair of the Diamond Necklace" made history in France. Villette played the role of forger by writing letters to Jeanne in the hand of Queen Marie Antoinette to make it seem as if Marie Antoinette desired the necklace but was unable to purchase it because of the reluctance on the part of King Louis XVI. The letters were presented in turn to Cardinal Rohan and persuaded him to buy the necklace for the Queen or so he thought. After the necklace had been purchased by Rohan and given to Saint-Remy to pass along to the queen, she and her husband, Nicolas de la Motte, immediately took off to London and began selling the jewels from the necklace for their own profit. Villette later testified against the La Mottes. The scheme was eventually exposed, and all of those involved were prosecuted, including Villette.

== Later life ==
As punishment for his involvement in the "Affair of the Diamond Necklace", Villette was exiled from France. Moving to Italy, he wrote a book about the affair published in Venice in 1790 (three years before Marie Antoinette was executed). He lived out the remainder of his days in poverty under an assumed name, eventually dying in 1797, at the age of 43..

== In fiction ==
Simon Baker appears as Rétaux de Villette in The Affair of the Necklace (2001). He is described as an arrogant, well-connected gigolo.
