= Nicole de Savigny =

French noblewoman (1535-1590)

Nicole de Savigny (1535–1590) was a French noblewoman. She was a mistress to Henry II of France in 1556–57.

== Biography ==
De Savigny was the daughter of Georges II of Savigny and his first wife, Nicole d'Haussonville. She had a child with the king, Henry de Saint-Rémy (1557−1621). She was ancestress of Jeanne de Valois-Saint-Rémy.

== Sources ==
- Febvre, Lucien (1910). "L'Application du Concile de Trente et L'Excommunication Pour Dettes en Franche-Comte". Revue Historique. T. 103, Fasc. 2. Presses Universitaires de France.
- Knecht, R. J. (2014). Catherine De'Medici. Routledge.
