= Henri de Saint-Nectaire =

French soldier and diplomat of the 18th century

Croix du Saint-Esprit

Henri, marquis de Saint-Nectaire (1667 – 1 April 1746) was a French nobleman, soldier and diplomat.

The Marquis de Saint-Nectaire was commissioned in the Senneterre Dragoons, advancing to the rank of Brigadier in 1704 and Maréchal de camp later the same year. He was promoted Lieutenant-General of the French Army in 1718, before being posted to London by King Louis XV, where he served as Ambassador to Great Britain until 1720; he was appointed Chevalier du Saint-Esprit in 1724.

== Family ==
His father, Jean-Charles de Saint-Nectaire (1608–1696), styled comte de Brinon (who was the third son of Jacques de Saint-Nectaire, baron de Manoir de la Grolière), married in 1654 Marguérite (died 1701), sole heiress of Timoléon de Boves, baron de Contenant; of their five children, two survived childhood: Henri, who inherited his father's ancestral titles and his sister Madeleine, who married Pierre-Gilbert Colbert, marquis de Villacerf.

Upon his death in 1746, he was succeeded by his cousin, Jean-Charles, as marquis de Saint-Nectaire.

== See also ==
- List of Ambassadors of France to Great Britain
- Château de La Ferté-Saint-Aubin
- House of Saint Nectaire
