= Jean-François Géorgel =

French clergyman

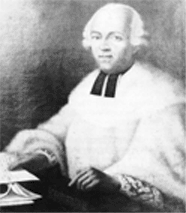
Abbott Géorgel.

Jean-François Géorgel (29 January 1731 in Bruyères (Alsace region) – 1813 in the same city) was a French clergyman, abbot and member of the Society of Jesus.

He is particularly known for the six volumes of his memoirs of the French Revolution entitled Mémoires pour servir à l'histoire des événements de la fin du dix-huitième siècle. He also wrote a Voyage de St Pétersbourg en 1800. Both works were published by his nephew in 1818.

== Publications ==
- Réponse à un écrit anonyme, intitulé : Mémoire sur les rangs et les honneurs de la cour, Paris, Le Breton & Veuve Duchesne, 1771 (in-octavo). Ouvrage lors de la polémique touchant la prétention des Rohan au titre de Prince. Géorgel, co-adjuteur du cardinal de Rohan, Louis René Édouard de Rohan, défendit bien entendu le titre de prince.
- Mémoires pour servir à l'histoire des événemens [sic] de la fin du dix-huitième siècle (6 vol.). Paris: Librairies Alexis Eymery et Delaunay. 1817–1818.
- Voyage à Saint-Pétersbourg en 1799-1800, published by M. Georgel, nephew of the author, Paris : A. Eymery, 1818 (in-octavo, 487 p.).
