= Fontette =

Commune in Grand Est, France

- Commune
- Location of Fontette
- Location within France Location within Grand Est
- Coordinates: 48°04′54″N 4°36′35″E
- Country: France
- Region: Grand Est
- Department: Aube
- Arrondissement: Troyes
- Canton: Bar-sur-Seine
- Intercommunality: Barséquanais en Champagne

Government
  - Mayor (2020–2026): Laurent Jurvilliers
- Area^{1}: 19.36 km^{2} (7.47 sq mi)
- Elevation: 300 m (980 ft)
- Highest elevation: 357 m (1,171 ft)
- Lowest elevation: 230 m (750 ft)
- Population (2023): 178
  - Density: 9.19/km^{2} (23.8/sq mi)
- Time zone: UTC+01:00 (CET)
  - Summer (DST): UTC+02:00 (CEST)
- INSEE/Postal code: 10155 /10360
- ^{1} French Land Register data, which excludes lakes, ponds, glaciers > 1 km^{2} (0.386 sq mi or 247 acres) and river estuaries.

Fontette (French pronunciation: [fɔ̃tɛt]) is a commune in the Aube department in north-central France. It is around 180 km south-east of Paris.

== Population ==
Historical population
Year	Pop.	±% p.a.
1968	211	—
1975	225	+0.92%
1982	219	−0.39%
1990	188	−1.89%
1999	176	−0.73%
2007	177	+0.07%
2012	182	+0.56%
2017	206	+2.51%
2023	178	−2.41%
Source: INSEE

== See also ==
- Communes of the Aube department
