= Jean-Marie de Bancalis de Maurel, marquis d'Aragon =

French diplomat (1732–1795)

Bancalis de Maurel arms

Jean-Marie de Bancalis de Maurel, marquis d'Aragon (born 1732 at Pruines; died 1795 at Carcassonne) was a French diplomat and aristocrat of the Ancien Régime.

The son of Pierre de Bancalis (1691–1761), he inherited the estate and lordship of Aragon, in 1758, from his maternal uncle, Jean-Marie de Maurel (on condition he assumed the additional name and arms de Maurel).

He served briefly as French Ambassador to the Court of St James's but was recalled to Paris by the Revolutionary Government and, although he was not guillotined, he was imprisoned.

He married, in 1761, Marchioness Henriette née de Portes de Pardaillan, who predeceased him; he died shortly after his release from prison in 1795.

The family was stripped of its ancestral estates by the Republicans, although the titular marquisate devolved upon his son Jean-Louis-Henri de Bancalis de Maurel (whose daughter Ida married Joseph-Léonard, vicomte Decazes); the title remains extant.

== See also ==
- List of Ambassadors of France to the United Kingdom
