= Jacques-Abraham Durand d'Aubigny =

French diplomat and lawyer

Jacques-Abraham Durand d'Aubigny (1707–1776) was a French diplomat and lawyer of the Ancien Régime.

He was born on September 14, 1707, in Beaune (Saint-Pierre).

He was appointed a Chevalier de l'Ordre de St Lazare.

== See also ==
- List of ambassadors of France to the Kingdom of Great Britain
