= Nicholas de la Motte =

French adventurer

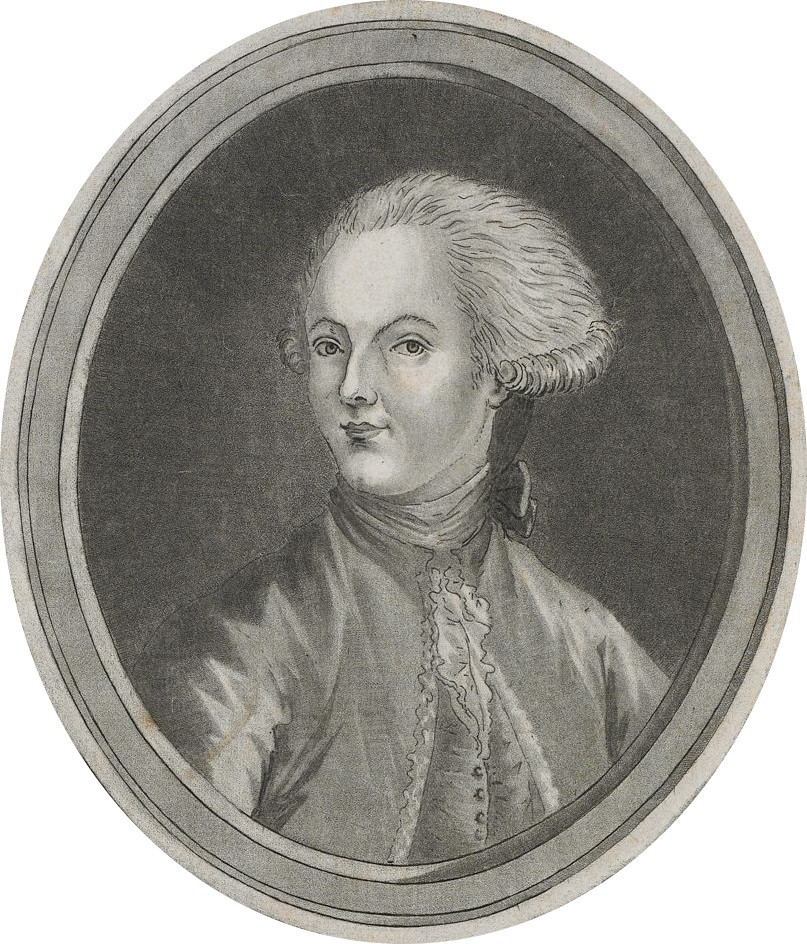
Marc Antoine-Nicolas de La Motte

Nicholas de la Motte (Bar-sur-Aube 29 July 1755 – Paris 6 November 1831), born Marc Antoine-Nicolas de la Motte, was a French adventurer known for his part as a swindler in the affair of the diamond necklace. He was the husband of Jeanne de Valois-Saint-Remy, whom he married on 6 June 1780.

He claimed to be a nobleman and gave himself the title of Comte (Count). However, his claim to nobility was dubious.

At the time of his marriage, he was known only as an officer of the gendarmes. Through his wife's influence on her paramour, the Cardinal de Rohan, he later obtained a commission as the Count of Artois's bodyguard.

La Motte died in November 1831 in Paris, France, forty five years after the affair at the age of 76.

La Motte is a supporting antagonist to Jeanne Valois in the 1972 manga the Rose of Versailles and its 1979 anime adaptation.
