= Louis-René de Rohan =

French cardinal (1734–1803)

His Eminence Louis-René-Édouard de Rohan COHS
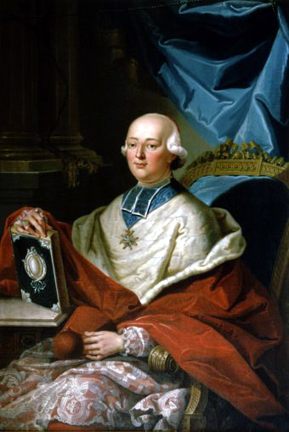
- Louis de Rohan

Grand Almoner of France
- In office 1777–1786
- Preceded by: Charles Antoine de La Roche-Aymon
- Succeeded by: Louis-Joseph de Montmorency-Laval

Ambassador of France to Austria
- In office 1771–1774
- Preceded by: Jacques-Abraham Durand d'Aubigny
- Succeeded by: Jean-François Géorgel
- Cardinal, Prince-Bishop of Strasbourg
- Diocese: Diocese of Strasbourg
- Installed: 11 March 1779
- Term ended: 29 November 1801
- Predecessor: Louis Constantin de Rohan
- Successor: Johann Peter Saurine

Orders
- Ordination: 1756
- Consecration: 18 May 1760 by Christophe de Beaumont
- Created cardinal: 1 June 1778 by Pope Pius VI
- Rank: Cardinal of the Catholic Church

Personal details
- Born: 25 September 1734 Paris, Kingdom of France
- Died: 16 February 1803 (aged 68) Ettenheim, Prince-Bishopric of Strasbourg
- Denomination: Roman Catholic Church
- Coat of arms

Louis-René-Édouard de Rohan, known as Cardinal de Rohan (25 September 1734 – 16 February 1803), Prince de Rohan-Guéméné, was a French bishop of Strasbourg, politician, cardinal of the Catholic Church, and cadet of an ancient and powerful House of Rohan (which traced its origin to the Kings of Brittany). His parents were Hercule Mériadec, Prince of Guéméné, and Princess Louise Gabrielle Julie de Rohan-Rohan. He was born in Paris.

Members of the Rohan family had filled the office of bishop of Strasbourg since 1704, which made them princes of the Holy Roman Empire and the compeers rather of the German prince-bishops than of the French ecclesiastics. Louis de Rohan was destined for this high office from birth. Soon after taking orders, in 1760, he was nominated coadjutor to his uncle, Louis Constantin de Rohan-Rochefort, who then held the bishopric, and he was also appointed titular bishop of Canopus, Egypt. But he preferred the elegant life and the gaiety of Paris to his clerical duties, and had also an ambition to make a figure in politics. In 1761 he was elected to seat 36 of the Académie Française.

Louis de Rohan was a member of the palace cabal opposed to the Austrian alliance. This party was headed by the Duc d'Aiguillon who, in 1771, sent Rohan on a special embassy to find out what was being done in Vienna with regard to the partition of Poland. Rohan arrived at Vienna in January 1772, and made a great spectacle of himself with his lavish entertainments. Empress Maria Theresa was hostile to his intrigues; not only did he attempt to thwart her alliance with France, but as a vicar of the Church, he made little secret of his venal lifestyle.

On the death of Louis XV in 1774, Rohan was recalled from Vienna, and coldly received in Paris; but his family's influence was too great for him to be neglected; in 1777 he was made Grand Almoner of France, and in 1778, abbot of St. Vaast. In 1778, he was made a cardinal on the nomination of Stanislaus Poniatowski (the king of Poland). In 1779, Louis de Rohan succeeded his uncle, Constantine de Rohan-Rochefort, as bishop of Strasbourg, though he spent much of his career working in Paris, as he preferred a fashionable life to his clerical duties; also in 1779, he became abbot of Noirmoutiers and Chaise-Dieu. Despite his enhanced status, which brought him an income of two and a half million livres, the Cardinal was poorly received at court, having made himself an enemy of Queen Marie Antoinette, the daughter of Empress Maria Theresa, whose disapproval he had earned in Vienna.

Wishing to redeem himself in the eyes of the Queen, he got involved in the "affair of the diamond necklace" with the Comtesse de la Motte and others, including the notorious Cagliostro. Rohan was led to believe that his attentions to the Queen were welcomed, and that she approved his arrangements for her to purchase the infamous necklace. When the swindle was discovered, the Cardinal was arrested and implicated in the theft, though he was later found to have been an innocent dupe. At the trial in 1786 before the parlement of Paris his acquittal was received with popular enthusiasm, and regarded as a victory over the royal court at Versailles and, in particular, the Queen. He was deprived of his office as grand almoner and exiled to his abbey of Chaise-Dieu, where he was accompanied by his secretary, Louis Ramond de Carbonnières. The following year, he travelled to the thermal spas of the Pyrenees, spending the summer and the autumn in Barèges, where Ramond began his geological investigations.

Rohan was soon allowed to return to Strasbourg, and his popularity was shown by his election in 1789 to the Estates-General by the clergy of the bailliages of Haguenau and Wissembourg. He, at first, declined to sit, but when the Estates-General became the National Assembly, it insisted on validating his election. However, in January 1791, as a prince of the church, he refused to take the oath to the Civil Constitution of the Clergy, and went to Ettenheim, in the German part of his diocese. In exile, he spent what wealth remained to him in providing for the poor clergy of his diocese who had been obliged to leave France. On 29 November 1801, he resigned his nominal office as Bishop of Strasbourg and went back to Ettenheim, where he died on 17 February 1803.

== Depiction in media ==
His role in the affair of the diamond necklace scandal is depicted in a 2001 American historical drama film, The Affair of the Necklace, directed by Charles Shyer, in which he was played by Jonathan Pryce, and in the anime Rose of Versailles.

Rohan is portrayed by Barnett Parker in the 1938 film Marie Antoinette. The character plays a key role, particularly in scenes following the entr'acte (intermission).

Catholic Church titles
Preceded by Louis Constantin de Rohan	Bishop of Strasbourg; 1779-1801	Succeeded by Johann Peter Saurine
