= Hilda Annetta Walker =

English sculptor and painter

Hilda Annetta Walker FRSA
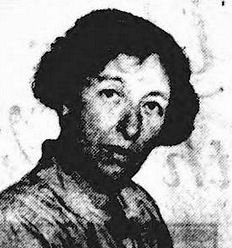
- Hilda Walker
- Born: 1877; Mirfield, West Riding of Yorkshire, England
- Died: 3 June 1960 (aged 82–83); Heaton, Bradford
- Education: Leeds College of Art
- Known for: Sculpture, paintings of Wharfedale, portraits of horses
- Style: Figurative painting

Hilda Annetta Walker FRSA (1877 – 3 June 1960) was an English sculptor, and a painter of landscapes, seascapes and horses, flourishing between 1902 and 1958. She was a war artist painting in England during the First and Second World Wars, and described as "escapist". Some of her early work was the production of oilette postcard paintings for Raphael Tuck & Sons, of firemen and horses. She was born in Mirfield, Yorkshire, England, to a family of blanket manufacturers who had the means to foster her art education. She grew up in the Protestant work ethic of Congregationalism, and attended Leeds College of Art, where she studied under William Gilbert Foster of the Staithes group and William Charles Holland King, sculptor of Dover Marine War Memorial. She signed her works "Hilda Walker" or sometimes "Hilda A. Walker".

Her siblings included Ronald Walker, Eric Walker and Dora Walker. The artist Marie Walker Last was her niece.

== Background ==
=== Tradition of manufacturing ===
Walker was born amidst a background of manufacturing in the industrial 19th-century north of England. Walker's father, grandfather, great grandfather and great-great grandfather were all in the blanket-manufacturing trade. Walker's paternal grandparents were Batley mill-owner James Walker and Annetta Bentley (Gildersome c. 1809 – Bramley 1886), who married in the Warwick area in 1846.

Walker's immediate family displayed the Calvinist work ethic of Congregationalism, together with financial support of education as might be available to the sons and daughters of successful 19th-century Yorkshire textile mill owners. Thus Walker came from a "distinguished family". Her father was John Ely Walker JP (Batley 1847 – Spen Valley 24 October 1943), co-owner of James Walker & Sons, at Holme Bank and Butt End Mills, Mirfield, Low Mills, Dewsbury and Croft Mills, Witney, Oxfordshire, a rug and carpet manufacturer who had been apprenticed at the mill at age 17. The firm employed 500 people in 1914. He was chairman of the Dewsbury West Riding magistrates' bench, president of the Mirfield Liberal Party and of the Morley Divisional Liberal Association. He was a founder member of Healey Congregational Church, Batley. He and his brother Sam Walker (c. 1852–1942) still had a hand in the business in their eighties and nineties, when they were said to be, "probably the two oldest men in England still taking active part in the direction of a large business".

Walker's mother was Mary Elizabeth Firth, (b. Heckmondwike c. 1853). who married John Ely Walker in Dewsbury in 1874.

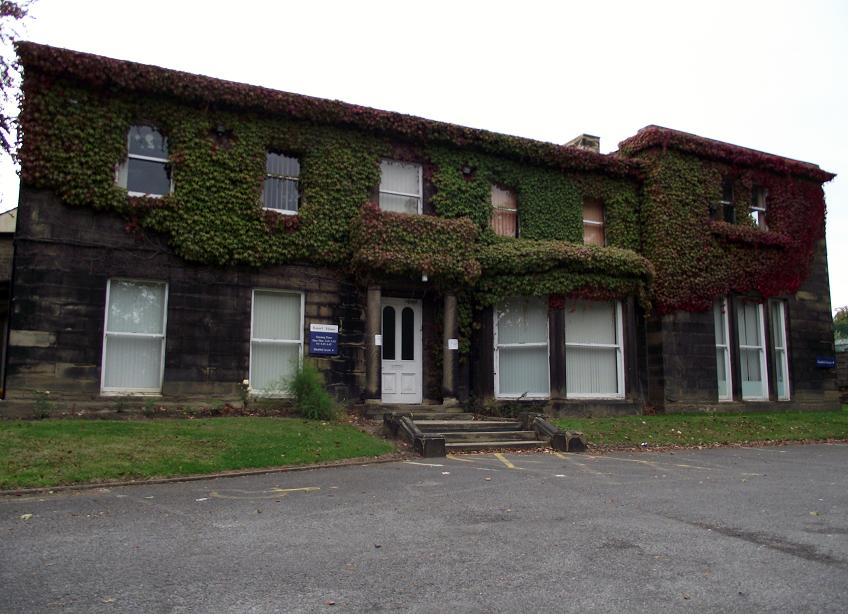
Knowl House, formerly the Walker family home, 2011

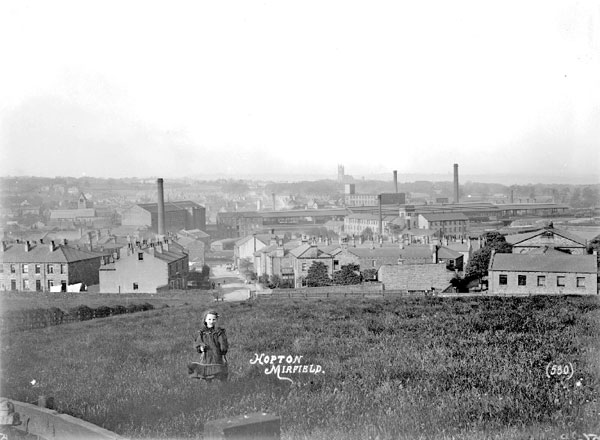
Mirfield, Walker's home town, 1905

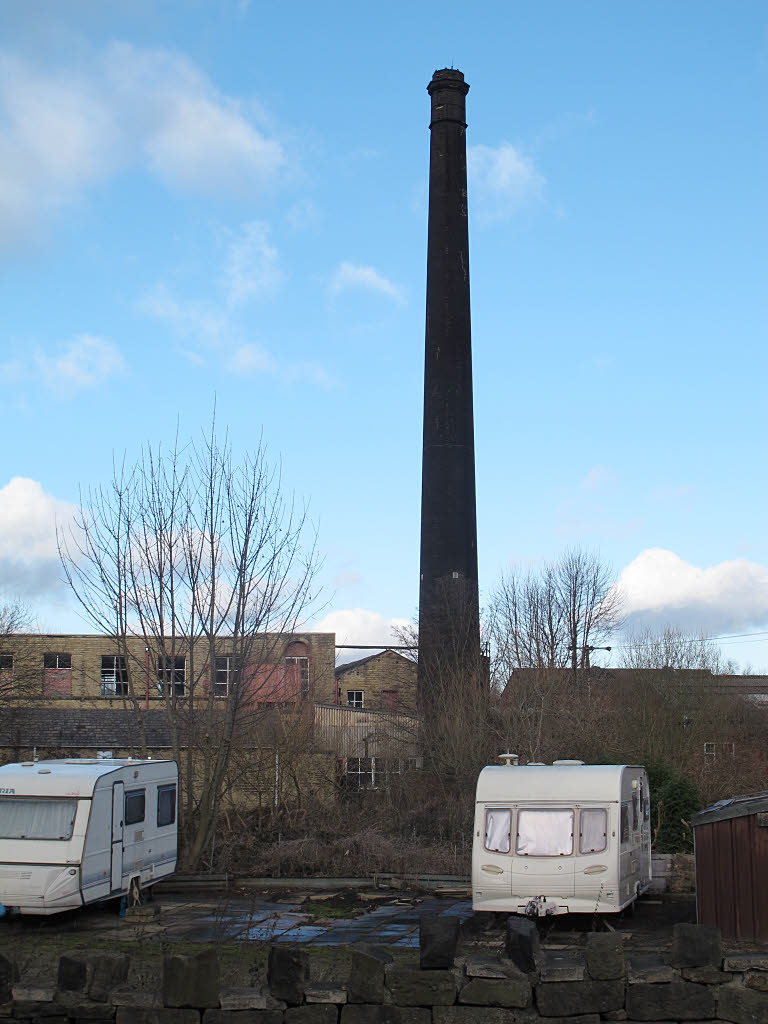
Chimney of Holme Bank Mill, 2017

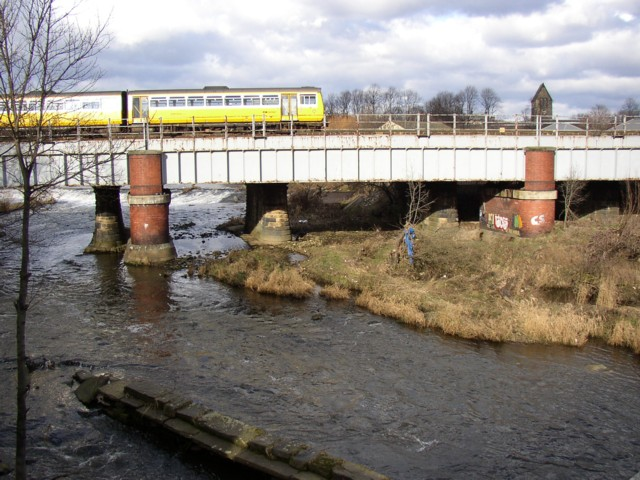
Remains of mill tail race of the former Butt End Mill (bottom left), 2008

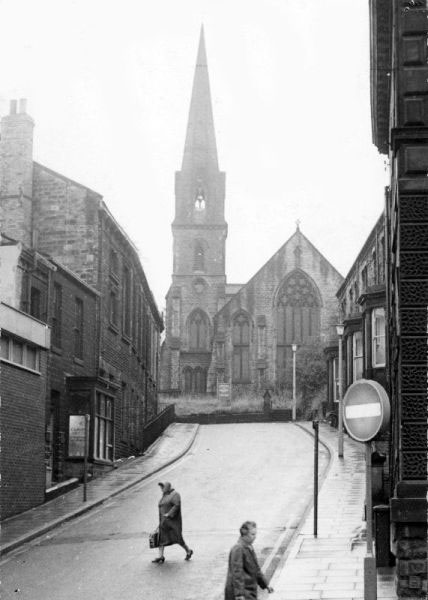
Healey Congregational Church, Batley, with which J. E. Walker was associated

=== Walker and her Family ===
Walker was born in 1877 in Mirfield in the West Riding of Yorkshire, one of eleven siblings, most of whom were high-achievers. Her brother James (b.c. 1879) was a colonel, a DSO, a Home Guard zone commander and deputy lieutenant for the West Riding of Yorkshire. Her brother Sir Ronald Fitz-John Walker (24 November 1880 – 26 March 1971) was chairman of the Yorkshire Liberal Party and of the National Liberal Party. Her brother Reginald Firth (b.1884) was awarded the Military Cross in the First World War. Her brother Eric Walker (1896 – 11 April 1983) was an RAF flying officer, who was awarded the Distinguished Flying Cross in the First World War, and was mentioned in dispatches for his contribution to administration for Bomber Command in the Second World War. Previously he had been president of Spenborough Chamber of Commerce. Her brother Cyril Gordon (1885 – 27 March 1918) was killed in the First World War. Her sister Mrs Ethel M.E. "Mary" Atkinson (b.1875) was a councillor for West Riding County Council. Her sister Dora Muriel Walker (2 July 1890 – 1980) was the first woman to run a fishing trawler out of Whitby and was a VAD in Belgium and France in the First World War. In the Second World War Dora continued to fish, but also assisted in London air raid shelters. Walker's sister Kathleen Marguerite (9 January 1883 – 1976) was secretary to Ramsay Macdonald, a journalist and an author. Walker had two other siblings: Lieutenant-Colonel Hubert Walker (b.1886) father of artist Marie Walker Last, and Vera Evaline Walker (24 November 1887 – 1979). Four of Walker's nieces and nephews including Marie Walker Last served in the military during the Second World War. She was the great great aunt of James Northcote (actor).

Walker attended Leeds College of Art, studying painting under William Gilbert Foster, and sculpture under William Charles Holland King, sculptor of Dover Marine War Memorial. Gray (2019) suggests that she may also have studied in London.

=== Between the wars ===
Walker lived in Knowl House, Knowl Road, Mirfield with her parents, until the 1930s. The mansion was donated to the people of Mirfield by the Walker family in 1943, but in 2013 Kirklees Council sold it. Other early addresses were The Outpost, Mirfield, and an address in Leeds. Walker used some addresses concurrently, because she also lived in Hebden, in the West Riding of Yorkshire where she had her studio between 1921 and 1955. Between the wars, Walker performed public duties; for example in March 1925 she opened a sale of work at Cleckheaton, for the Liberal Club there.

=== Second World War ===
During the Second World War, Walker produced war paintings, (Note: For a review of some of Walker's war paintings, see her 1941 exhibition listed below) and undertook some public engagements. In Mirfield War Weapons Week, May 1941, she opened the Yorkshire Observer's War Photographs Exhibition at Trinity School, Easthorpe, North Yorkshire. (Note: The Yorkshire Observer is now defunct) While there, she took time to praise the artwork of the school pupils. In January 1942 she presented the Mirfield Hospital Supply Services Depot with pieces of blanket from her father's factory. They were sewn together to make blankets. One of these was presented to the Princess Royal (later to become Elizabeth II) who "was pleased to accept one for use as a pattern for her own depot". In May 1943, Walker presented art prizes of savings stamps at the RAF Equipment and Photographic Exhibition at Mirfield, where children had entered a competition for Wings for Victory Week. This was part of a wartime campaign by Mirfield to raise £70,000 for the war effort, and the children's competition was the opening feature of that week.

=== Post-war ===
Walker and her brother Hubert donated several artworks to public art galleries. When John Ely Walker died in 1943, they donated the paintings Fruit Girl by James Northcote and The Golden Bough after J. M. W. Turner to Doncaster Museum and Art Gallery. At an unknown date, Walker donated Runswick Fish Wife by her teacher William Gilbert Foster to Kirklees Museums and Galleries.

=== Death ===
Walker died aged 82 on 3 June 1960 at Greystones nursing home in Heaton, Bradford. She left over £29,000 (equivalent to £580,000 in 2025) to her sister Dora. Walker's niece Marie Walker Last had the use of her house at Hebden after her death.

== Career ==
Walker's London working address was Wychcombe Studios near Haverstock Hill, then a studio at Cranley Gardens, Kensington. She was a Fellow of the Royal Society of Arts. She was also a member of the New Society of Artists, a member of the Forum Club and an Associate of the Society of Women Artists between 1951 and 1958. In her native Yorkshire, Walker was "known for her sculptures and painted panels," also for her oil paintings and watercolours, especially views of Wharfedale, and portraits of horses, and for her miniatures and print-making. Her many bronze and marble sculptures were portraits and figures, however some existing versions are reproductions of her work. She was a figurative artist. She said, "In spite of the sneers of the highbrow against any pictures being photographic ... some of us wish that the modernistic daubs we sometimes see were considerably more so. We should then know without consulting our catalogues what they really represent".

A print of Walker's painting A Prairie Fire was published in The Boy's Own Paper in the 19th century.

== Works ==
Walker's sculptural works include Pixie, The Water Baby, Dian, Katharine Marie Walker, Across the Sands O' Dee (1923), Sleep (1924) and Sleep-mask (1925).

=== Examples of works ===
Sheep grazing above Runswick Bay, 1902

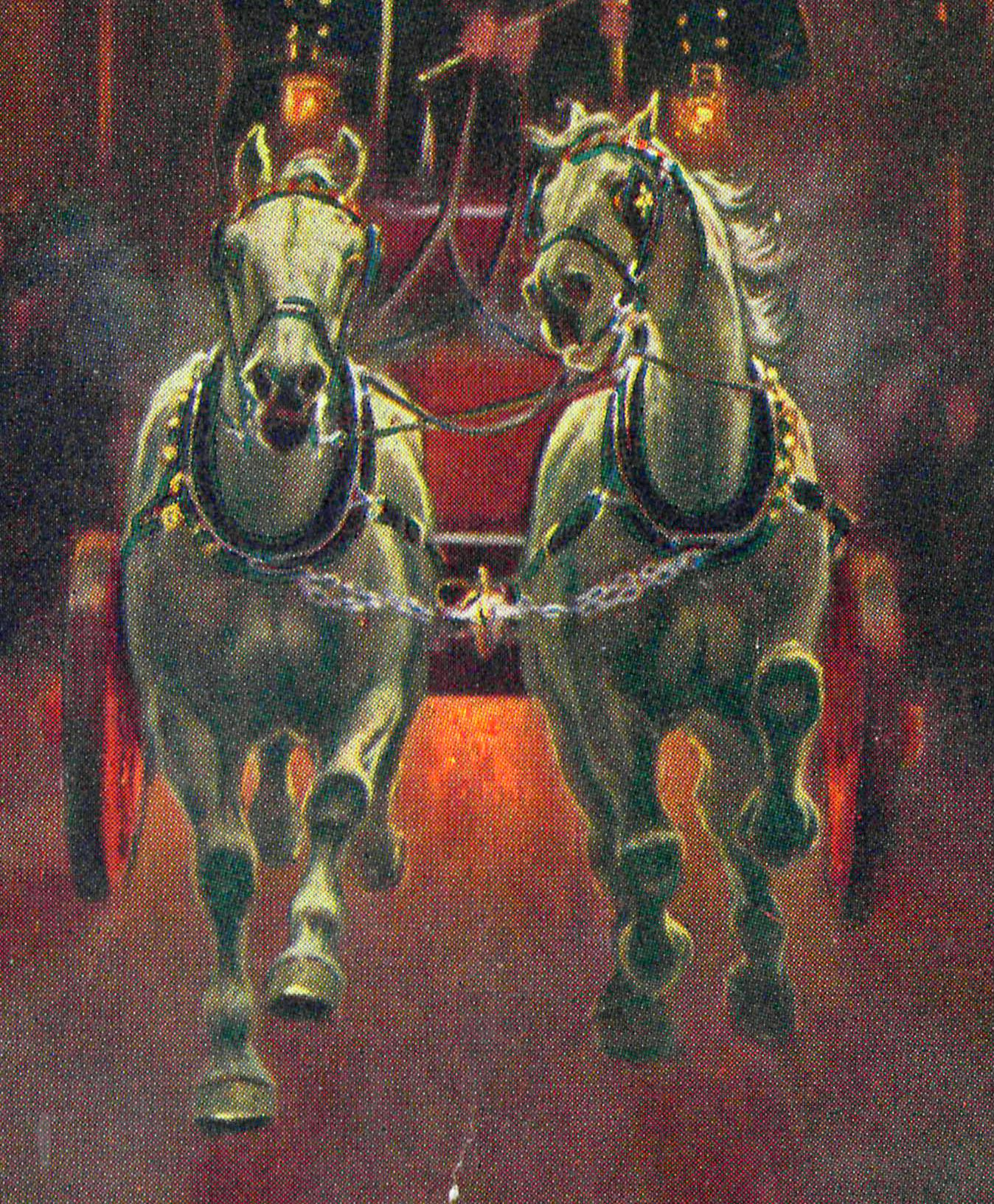
From To the Rescue, 1902–1904

Cavalry horses and distant encampment, 1911

The Charge, 1902–1914

Scouting, 1914–1918

=== Exhibitions ===
Walker exhibited at the Royal Academy of Arts, and in Paris, besides the following venues.

- 1901 March, Leeds Art Gallery: Shere Khan, which the Yorkshire Post described as "a good study of a well known animal".
- 1901 October, Leeds Art Gallery: Break, break, break, at the foot of the crags O sea!, (Note: Quotation from the poem Break, Break, Break by Alfred Lord Tennyson) described as a "free effect".
- 1902–1955, Cartwright Hall, Bradford: Joe (1902); The gate of summer, Early autumn, Norfolk, Shere Khan, pictures (1903); Peter Pan, sculpture (1920); Trebarwith Strand, picture (undated); Eve bronze statuette (1938); Col. James Walker, DSO, DL bronze head, The Seer bronze head (1940); Marie marble head (1941); Blue Shadows, Wharfedale, watercolour (1945); The Wave plaster, Sleep bronze mask (1947); Melisande in the Wood bronze statuette, Michael Ward, actor bronzed plaster head (1948); The Tenderfoot statuette, Skipper Dora plaster head (1949); Eve bronze statuette (1950); Diana marble bust (1952); The Seer bronze (1955);
- 1909 July, London Salon of the Allied Artists Association at the Royal Albert Hall: The Sands O' Dee, Trebarwith Strand and Shere Khan. Shere Khan was sold at this show for £10,108 (equivalent to £1,040,000 in 2025).
- 1910 October, former Walker Galleries, London: a trio exhibition with Lester Sutcliffe RCA and his wife. Walker showed monotypes. One of the coloured ones was Moorland, and one of the black and white ones, Chillon, "arrest[ed] special attention". The Queen magazine said: "They are undeniably clever and attractive, and are meeting with much praise from experts".
- 1920 Leeds Art Gallery, Annual Exhibition of Works by Artists of the Northern Counties: various works.
- 1920–1921, Society of Women Artists: various works.
- 1921 Royal Academy Summer Exhibition, London: bronze bust of Lieut.-Col. James Walker D.S.O.
- 1923 Royal Birmingham Society of Artists Spring Exhibition, Sculpture Across the Sands O' Dee.
- 1923 Laing Art Gallery, Annual Exhibition of Works by Artists of the Northern Counties: various works.
- 1824 Royal Birmingham Society of Artists Spring Exhibition, Sculpture Sleep.
- 1925 December, former Graham Gallery, London: twenty "bright, decorative little" watercolours of gardens at Kew, Somerset, Sanremo and Yorkshire, "aflame with flowers". The Yorkshire Post said, "She conveys with skill the charm of reflecting waters as in The Wharfe, Hebden.
- 1926 January, Suffolk Street Galleries, London: two sculptures, of bronze and of plaster, each titled Peter Pan.
- 1927 October, Forum Club, London.
- 1928 April, Mirfield Society Exhibition, Ings Grove House, Mirfield: "A collection of paintings and sculpture ... A figure in bronze of her father, Mr John Ely Walker, was specially admired".
- 1928 Leeds Art Gallery various works.
- 1936 Nay, Doncaster Beechfield Art Gallery: (Note: Doncaster Beechfield Art Gallery was formerly at Beechfield House. The art gallery was re-named and relocated in 1964, and in 2020 was due to be relocated again.) "Three fine bronzes" and a watercolour painting.
- 1939, Wakefield City Art Gallery: Bronze head of Miss Estelle Stead. (Note: The back of the sculpture has a label showing that it was exhibited at Wakefield City Art Gallery in 1839. See File:Estelle Stead by H.A. Walker (4).JPG)
- 1941 June, United Artists' Society exhibition, London: The Bradford Observer said, "Young England guarding the cliffs in khaki strikes an imaginative note, since he wears his respirator at the "alert," but no tin hat. She also gives us Skipper Dora, a young woman in oil-skins at the rudder, unperturbed by bombers over a convoy at uncomfortably close range. Here is a pleasant escapist show".
- 1949 March, Forum Club, London: "sculpture, water colours, and a number of paintings on wooden panels where the artist uses the grain of the wood as part of the composition". One work, Lovely Cottage, shows her own Hebden-in-Craven cottage with roses around the door, named after the 1946 Grand National winner.
- 1950–1958, Society of Women Artists: various works, including the bronzes The Late Viscount Simon, KCVO, KCSI, MC, Sleep, The Seer and Peter Pan, as well as Ophelia in marble.
- Various years, Société des Artistes Français exhibition, Paris: "various bronze and marble sculptures".
- Undated, Royal Institute of Painters in Water Colours, Liverpool: various works.
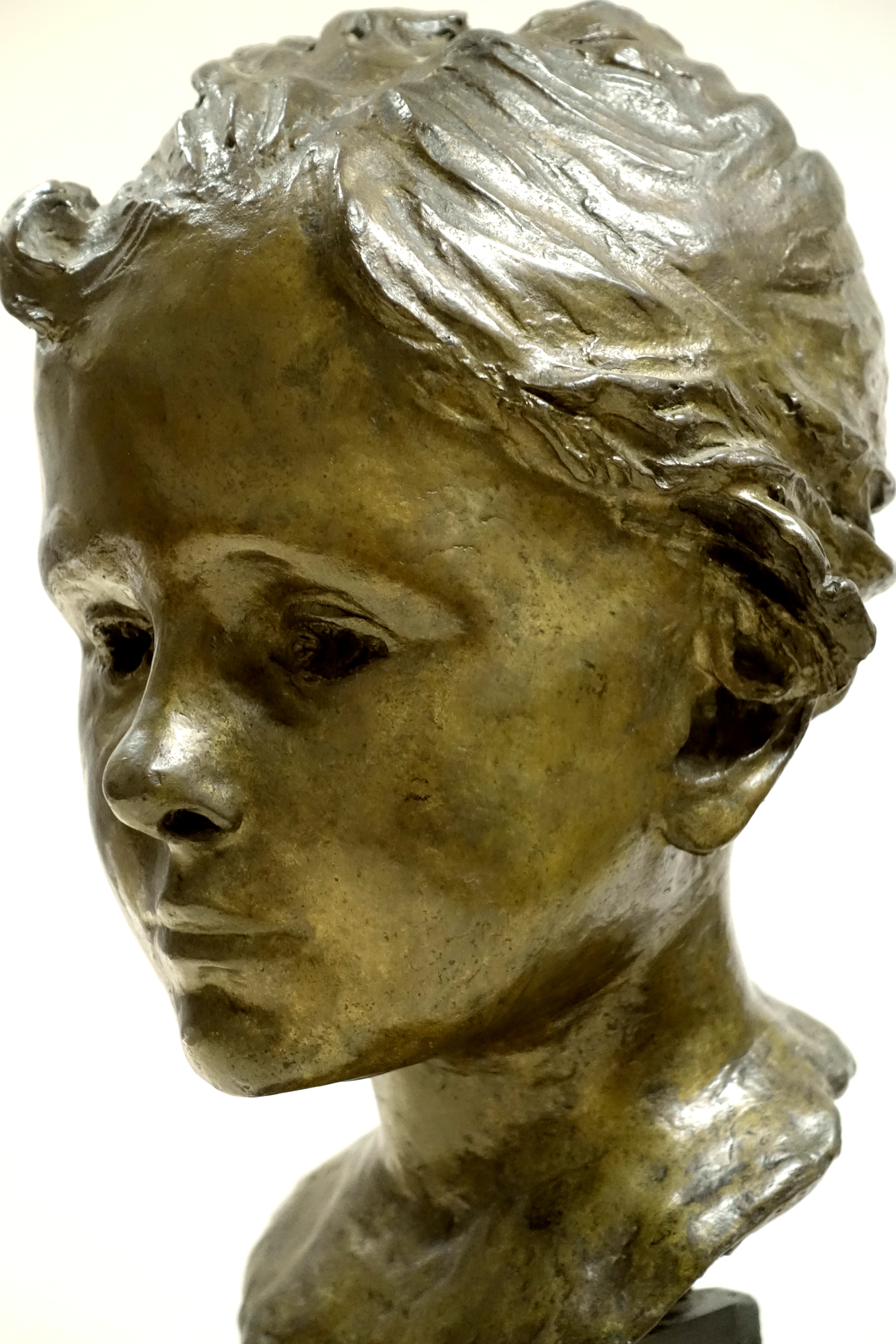
Plaster head of Peter Pan, c. 1922 (Cartwright Hall)

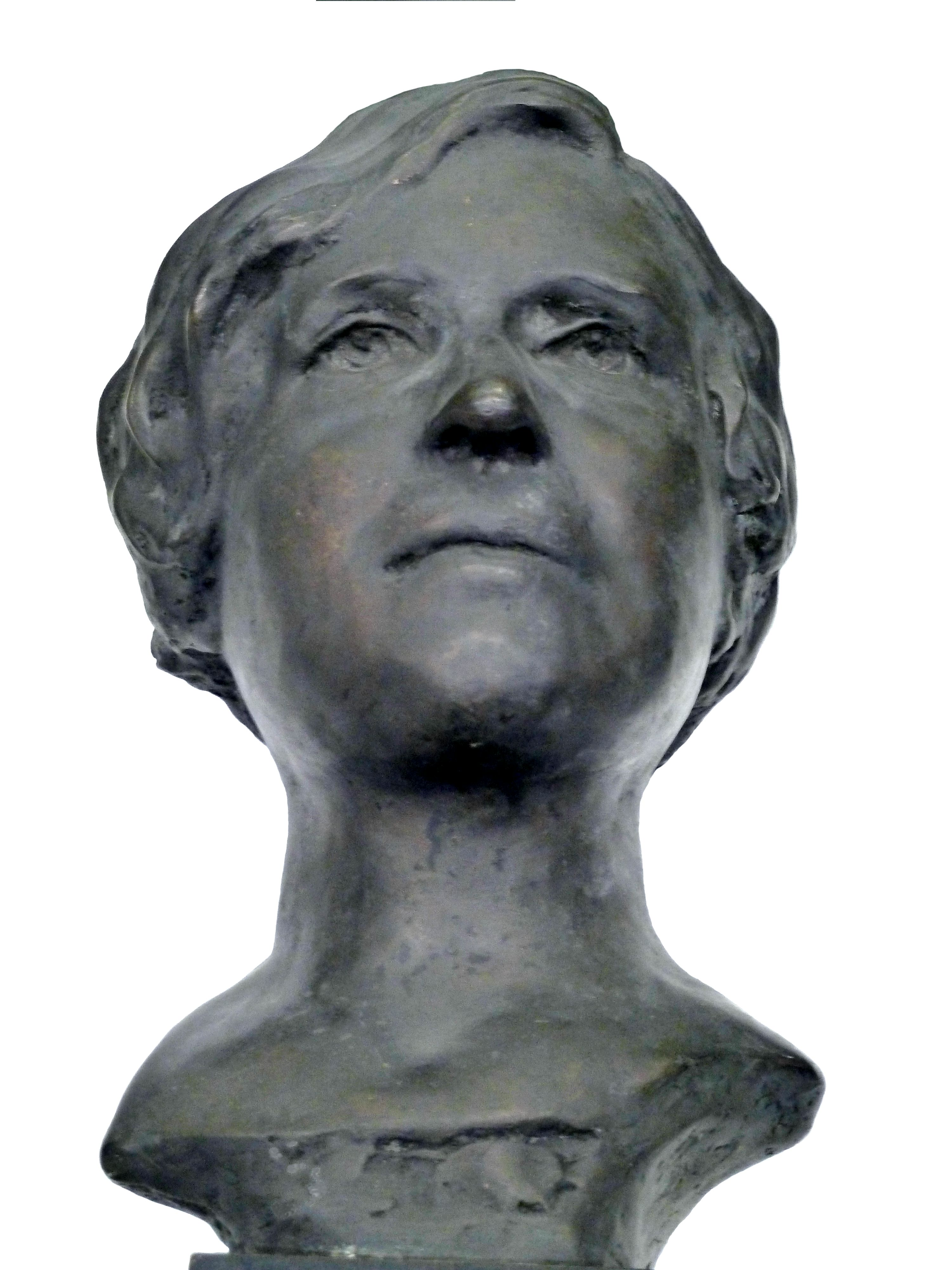
Bronze head of Miss Estelle Stead, exhibited at Wakefield in 1939 (The Hepworth)

== Collections ==
- Sculpture Peter Pan (undated) at Cartwright Hall, Bradford.
- Sculpture Miss Estelle Stead (1939) at The Hepworth Wakefield.
