= Jasmine Blackborow =

British actress (born 1991)

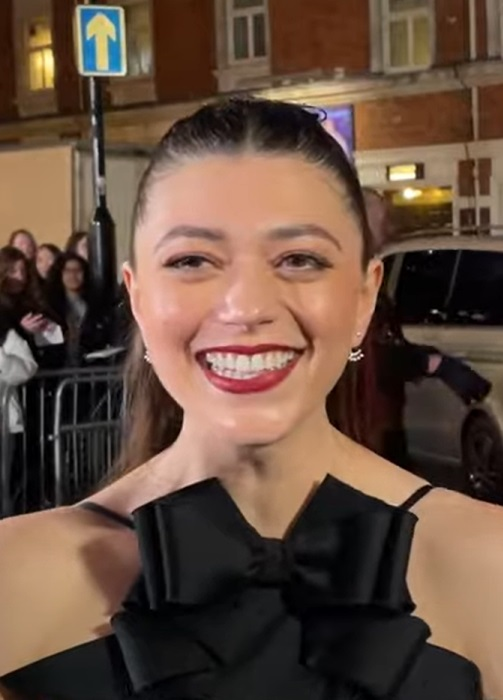
- Blackborow at the premiere of The Gentlemen in 2024
- Born: 28 August 1991 (age 35); Hackney, London, England
- Education: University of East Anglia; Royal Central School of Speech and Drama
- Occupation: Actress
- Years active: 2015–present

Jasmine Blackborow is an English actress. On television, she is known for her roles in the Netflix series Shadow and Bone (2021) and The Gentlemen (2024), and the Canal+ and BBC drama Marie Antoinette (2022). Her films include School's Out Forever (2021), Daemon Mind (2024), and Moss & Freud (2025).

== Early life and education ==
Jasmine Blackborow was born in Hackney, East London, and grew up in North London.

She graduated with a Master of Arts in classical acting from the Royal Central School of Speech and Drama.

== Career ==
Blackborow made her debut as the doomed Lucy in Bram Stoker's Dracula as adapted by Theresa Heskins for the New Vic Theatre in 2015. She then played Rosie in Rose Lewenstein's play Now This is Not the End at the Arcola Theatre. Her next role saw her play Maid Marian in Hood, directed by Jack McNamara. In 2016, she played Maya The Younger in Lulu Raczka's play Grey Man, directed by Robin Winfield-Smith. Blackborow then played Frances in Rodney Ackland's After October. Blackborow took on the roles Ursula in Much Ado About Nothing and Desdemona in Othello at Pop-up Globe in 2017, touring in New Zealand and Australia. She returned to London in 2018 to play Fanny Fairlove / Louisa in J.P. Wooler's rediscovered classic A Winning Hazard.

Following a main role in the 2014 short film The Swallow by Harry Baker, Blackborow played British volunteer Katlyn in Aamir, a short film about a 13-year-old refugee stranded alone at the infamous Calais Jungle encampment. Inspired by director Vika Evdokimenko's own experiences working as a volunteer in Calais, it was partially filmed on location at the encampment. The film was shown at festivals around the world and was nominated for the BAFTA Award for Best Short Film in 2018. In 2019, Blackborow played Georgie in a short comedy film, Dad Joke by David Abramsky, and Heather in Tosca Musk's The Protector. She next appeared as school matron Jane Crowther in the 2021 comedy horror film School's Out Forever. During lockdown in 2020, she filmed the British horror thriller Daemon Mind, which was completed in 2024 and released in April 2025.

In 2021, Blackborow made her television debut as Marie, an Inferni in the first season of Shadow and Bone, the Netflix adaptation of Leigh Bardugo's novel of the same name. In 2022, she was part of the main cast of the Canal+ and BBC drama series Marie Antoinette. Blackbarow next appeared in Guy Ritchie's 2024 Netflix series The Gentlemen, playing Lady Charlotte "Charly" Horniman, the sister of the main protagonists played by Theo James and Daniel Ings. She reprised the role in the second season of the series, which started production in 2025.

Blackborow had a supporting role in Gerard Johnson's Odyssey, a "gritty urban thriller" that premiered at the 2025 South by Southwest Film & TV Festival. In March 2025, it was announced that she had joined the cast of the upcoming Netflix crime thriller series Legends, alongside Steve Coogan, Tom Burke and Charlotte Ritchie. Blackborow was added to the cast of the upcoming Netflix adaptation of Jane Austen's Pride and Prejudice in August 2025, taking on the role of Charlotte Lucas.

In the Kate Moss biopic Moss & Freud (2025), directed by James Lucas and starring Derek Jacobi and Ellie Bamber, she played Bella Freud, the British fashion designer and daughter of artist Lucian Freud.

== Filmography ==
=== Film ===
Year	Title	Role	Notes
2014	The Swallow	Claudia Kent	Short film
2017	Aamir	Kaitlyn	Short film
2019	The Protector	Heather	
2019	The Interpreter		Short film
2020	Gutterwitch	Libby	Short film
2021	School's Out Forever	Matron	
2021	The Art of Love	Claire	
2024	Daemon Mind	Jessica	
2025	Odyssey	Dylan	
2025	Moss & Freud	Bella Freud	

=== Television ===
Key
Clock	Denotes television productions that have not yet been released

Year	Title	Role	Notes
2021	Shadow and Bone	Marie	Recurring role (season 1)
2022–2025	Marie Antoinette	Lamballe	Main cast
2024–present	The Gentlemen	Lady Charlotte "Charly" Horniman	Recurring role
2025	The Librarians: The Next Chapter	Marie	1 episode
2025	Lynley	Caroline Strong	1 episode
2026	Legends	Erin	Main cast
2026	Pride and Prejudice †	Charlotte Lucas	

== Stage ==
Year	Title	Role	Venue
2015	Dracula	Lucy	New Vic Theatre, Newcastle-under-Lyme
2015	Now This is Not the End	Rosie	Arcola Theatre, London
2015	Hood	Maid Marian	Theatre Royal, Nottingham
2016	Grey Man	Young Maya	Theatre503, London
2016	After October	Frances	Finborough Theatre, London
2017	Much Ado About Nothing	Ursula	Pop-up Globe, Auckland and Melbourne
2017	Othello	Desdemona	Pop-up Globe, Auckland and Melbourne
2018	A Winning Hazard	Fanny Fairlove / Louisa	Finborough Theatre, London
2022	Super High Resolution	Anna	Soho Theatre, London
2022	The Breach	Jude (1991)	Hampstead Theatre, London
2024	Here in America	Miss Bauer	Orange Tree Theatre, London

== Audio book narrator ==
Year	Title	Notes
2014	Binary Witness	Novel by Rosie Claverton
2016	Goldilocks and the Water Bears: The Search for Life in the Universe	Novel by Louisa Preston
2016	The Gift	Novel by Louise Jensen
2017	A Monster by Violet	Novel by Laura Wake
2018	Four Funerals and Maybe a Wedding	Novel by Rhys Bowen
2018	Friends Like These (Note: Co-narrated With Ellie Heydon.)	Novel by Sarah Alderson
2019	The Housemate (Note: Co-narrated with Polly Edsell.)	Novel by CL Pattinson
2019	What She Saw	Novel by Wendy Clarke
2019	Love and Death Among the Cheetahs	Novel by Rhys Bowen
2019	The Empty Nest	Novel by Sue Watson
2020	The Fortunate Ones	Novel by Catherine Hokin
2020	The Last Mrs Summers	Novel by Rhys Bowen
2021	The Downstairs Neighbor	Novel by Helen Cooper
2021	The Kitchen Front	Novel by Jennifer Ryan
2021	Regency Buck	Novel by Georgette Heyer
2021	God Rest Ye, Royal Gentlemen	Novel by Rhys Bowen
2023	The Housekeepers	Novel by Alex Hay
