= Dora Walker =

Walker on her boat Good Faith at Whitby

Dora Walker (1890–1980) was a British woman who became the first female fishing boat skipper on the north East coast. She became an author writing her memoirs and also history and tales of the fishing community in Whitby and the North East Coast.

== Early life and family ==
Dora Muriel Walker was born to John Ely and Mary Elizabeth Walker, a textile manufacturing family in Mirfield, Yorkshire. Her father was a blanket manufacturer, she was one of a large family, including brother Sir Ronald Walker, sisters artist Hilda and Kathleen – who became secretary to Ramsay MacDonald. She was the sister of Eric Walker (RAF officer) and of artist Hilda Annetta Walker, the aunt of Yorkshire artist Marie Walker Last, and the great-great aunt of actor James Northcote. In 2022 a sculpture was erected in her memory. The statue, consisting of a steel armature wrapped in hot-dipped galvanised steel wire, is part of a series of works completed by the sculptor on 26 March 2021 for Whitby's Walking Heritage Trail. Location: West Cliff, Whitby, North Yorkshire

== Career ==
=== World War I years ===
At the outbreak of war in 1914, she joined the British Red Cross but as they were not prepared to allow V.A.D's Voluntary Aid Detachment to nurse behind the front line she applied to join a Belgian Hospital run by Dr Antoine Depage and was accepted – working alongside Elisabeth of Bavaria, Queen of the Belgians. From a traditional, privileged and protected background she had left Yorkshire with a gift of an ambulance from her family. She later transferred to the Duchess of Sutherland Hospital founded and run by Millicent Leveson-Gower, Duchess of Sutherland in Calais on her return to Yorkshire she set up a boys' and men's club in Dewsbury

=== Whitby – seafaring and fishing ===
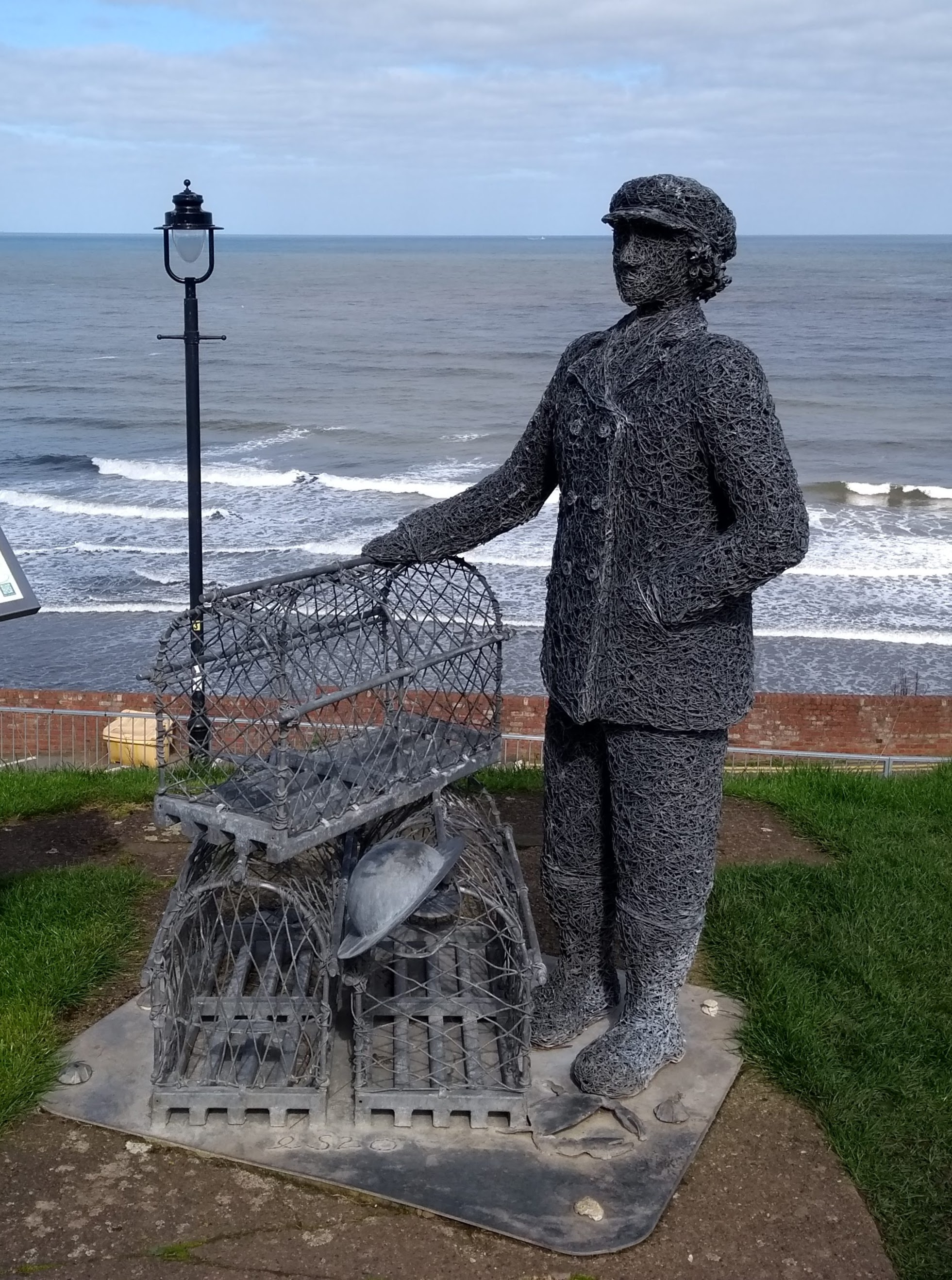
Wire sculpture of Walker by Emma Stothard, in Whitby, honouring her position as the "first female fishing boat skipper on the North East coast."

After the war, Walker suffered from bronchial problems and was recommended by her doctors to seek some sea air. She bought a cottage in Whitby where she became interested in the fishing, going out with Bobby Harland a local fisherman with her brother James. She had her own boat (Good Faith) built and fished as Skipper with Laurie Murfield as her crew who despite the adverse reaction of his fellow Whitby fisherman came to respect and admire her capabilities. Adept in handing long lines and crab pots and with fine navigational skills she became known as Skipper Dora and was accepted and respected in the fishing community.

She fished through World War II with a pistol in her belt and aided many rescues at sea with the life boat and others. After WW2, she created a fish company with her brothers James and Ronald to buy fish from the local fisherman at a reasonable price often selling at a loss – to assist the struggling families without loss of pride – this was kept secret until her death in 1980. At the end of her fishing career she gave Murfield and his son her boat, Good Faith.

She became the Honorary Keeper of the Whitby Museum in 1953 until her death and was also President of the Whitby Women's Lifeboat Guild. She wrote several books including With the Lost Generation 1915-1919, Freeman of the Sea, and They Labour Mightily. Many of her ship models were bequeathed to the Whitby Museum and can be seen on display in the Shipping Wing. An exhibition of her life is planned in May 2019 at the Whitby Museum.
