= James Northcote (actor) =

English actor and producer (born 1987)

- Born: James Walker; 10 October 1987 (age 38); London, England, UK
- Occupation: Actor
- Years active: 2011–present

James Northcote (born James Walker; 10 October 1987) is an English actor and producer who has appeared in Wuthering Heights (2011), Anna Karenina (2012), Nymphomaniac (2013), The Imitation Game (2014), and The Last Kingdom (2017–2022).

== Early life and family ==
Northcote, born in London, was brought up and went to school at King's College, Taunton in the West Country. He went into drama at Queens' College, Cambridge, where he studied English. He is the great-nephew of the artist Marie Walker Last and great-great-nephew of Ronald Walker, Eric Walker and artist Hilda Annetta Walker. As a member of the National Youth Theatre, he played celebrity chef Alexis Soyer in their 2010 production of Relish, written by James Graham about the life of Soyer under the direction of Paul Roseby. At university, he appeared with the Cambridge Footlights notably as the evil Nalu in the 2009 pantomime "Ali Baba and the Forty Thieves" and the Marlowe Society as Mercutio in a production of Romeo and Juliet. At the Edinburgh Fringe he played Toad in The Wind in the Willows, winning an Edinburgh NSDF Commendation - Emerging Artists Award.

== Professional career ==
In 2011, he made his professional debut as Edgar Linton in Wuthering Heights directed by Andrea Arnold. His theatre work includes appearing in the Trevor Nunn production of Rosencratz and Guildenstern are Dead by Tom Stoppard and The Resistible Rise of Arturo Ui by Bertolt Brecht at Chichester Festival. Stage roles include Caleb in the UK premier of The Whipping Man under the direction of Tom Attenborough at the Theatre Royal Plymouth, as Mr. Darcy in the Crucible Theatre Sheffield production of Pride and Prejudice, Millais in Lizzie Siddal at the Arcola and Yolland in the production of Translations by Brian Friel with the English Touring Theatre. Northcote appears in the controversial Lars von Trier film Nymphomaniac and as Mr. Vaughan in Belle. In 2018, he appeared at the Theatre Royal Bath as Alan Bennett in The Lady in the Van.

Northcote appears in the BBC drama SS-GB, based on the book of the same name by Len Deighton and in series 2 to 5 of The Last Kingdom as the character Aldhelm, a Mercian lord and advisor to the monarchy. He also appeared in The Imitation Game as mathematician Jack Good, with Benedict Cumberbatch as Alan Turing and Keira Knightley as Joan Clarke. Northcote appeared as the lead in the French film The Open directed by Marc Lehore. As a producer, he has completed a short film Morning is Broken, which was selected at British Film Institute Flare in 2015 and subsequently was used in the global Five Films 4 Freedom Campaign with the British Council.

== Filmography ==
=== Film ===
Year	Title	Role	Notes
2011	Wuthering Heights	Edgar Linton	Professional debut
2012	Anna Karenina	Princess Betsy's Footman	
2013	Nymphomaniac	Young Lad 1 on Train	
2013	Belle	Mr. Vaughan	
2014	The Imitation Game	Jack Good	
2015	The Open	Ralph	Also associate producer
2015	Patient Zero	Pete Townshend	
2015	Morning is Broken	—N/a	Producer
2016	A United Kingdom	Roberts	
2017	Ostrich	—N/a	Producer
2018	Patient Zero	Pete Townshend	
2023	The Last Kingdom: Seven Kings Must Die	Aldhelm	

=== Television ===
Year	Title	Role	Notes
2012	Silk	Tom McFarland	Episode: "In the Family Way"
2013	Endeavour	Johnny Broom	Episode: "Rocket"
2014	The Suspicions of Mr Whicher: The Ties That Bind	Linus Finch	TV film
2014	The Game	Waiter	Episode #1.1
2015	Life in Squares	Adrian Stephens	2 episodes
2017	SS-GB	John Spode	3 episodes
2017–2022	The Last Kingdom	Aldhelm	Series 2–5, 34 episodes
2019	Catherine the Great	Alexander Bezborodko	2 episodes
2023	Fool Me Once	Neil Burkett	5 episodes
2025	Marie Antoinette (Season 2)	Calonne	7 episodes
2025	Andor	Pono	Episode: 'Welcome to the Rebellion'
2025	Maigret (2025 TV series)	Joseph Moers	2 episodes
