= Mat Kirkby =

English filmmaker

Mat Kirkby is a Welsh filmmaker. In 2015, he won the Academy Award for Best Live Action Short Film for directing The Phone Call, a short drama film starring Sally Hawkins and Jim Broadbent. Kirkby wrote the film with his colleague James Lucas who both had family who worked on helplines. The short had its world premiere at the 2014 Tribeca Film Festival, where it also won Best Short Film. He began his career as a director of commercials and music videos for artists including Adele, Muse and Basement Jaxx.
