= Pride and Prejudice (2026 TV series) =

British television series

- Genre: Period drama
- Based on: Pride and Prejudice by Jane Austen
- Written by: Dolly Alderton
- Directed by: Euros Lyn
- Starring: Emma Corrin; Jack Lowden; Olivia Colman; Rufus Sewell
- Country of origin: United Kingdom
- Original language: English

Production
- Executive producers: Emma Corrin; Dolly Alderton; Euros Lyn; Laura Lankester; Will Johnston; Louise Mutter
- Producer: Lisa Osborne
- Production company: Lookout Point

Original release
- Network: Netflix

Pride and Prejudice is an upcoming television miniseries. It is an adaptation of the 1813 novel by Jane Austen, written by Dolly Alderton and directed by Euros Lyn for Netflix. The series is produced by Lookout Point, a BBC Studios company. The series is stated for release on 3 December 2026.

== Cast ==
- Emma Corrin as Elizabeth Bennet
- Jack Lowden as Mr. Fitzwilliam Darcy
- Olivia Colman as Mrs. Bennet
- Rufus Sewell as Mr. Bennet
- Freya Mavor as Jane Bennet
- Hopey Parish as Mary Bennet
- Hollie Avery as Catherine "Kitty" Bennet
- Rhea Norwood as Lydia Bennet
- Daryl McCormack as Mr. Charles Bingley
- Siena Kelly as Caroline Bingley
- Louis Partridge as Mr. George Wickham
- Jasmine Blackborow as Charlotte Lucas
- Jamie Demetriou as Mr. William Collins
- Fiona Shaw as Lady Catherine de Bourgh
- Anjana Vasan as Mrs. Gardiner
- Sebastian Armesto as Mr. Gardiner
- Rosie Cavaliero as Lady Lucas
- Justin Edwards as Sir William Lucas
- Saffron Coomber as Mrs. Hurst
- James Dryden as Mr. Hurst
- James Northcote as Colonel Forster
- Eloise Webb as Harriet Forster
- Isabella Sermon as Georgiana Darcy

== Production ==
=== Development ===
In October 2024 it was reported that Dolly Alderton was adapting the 1813 novel Pride and Prejudice by Jane Austen for streaming service Netflix. The adaptation was described as being "progressive" in outlook. Executive producers include Will Johnston and Louise Mutter for Lookout Point, Corrin, Alderton, Lyn, and Laura Lankester. Lisa Osborne serves as producer.

=== Casting ===
In April 2025, Jack Lowden was reportedly in talks for the role of Mr Darcy. The following day, Emma Corrin and Olivia Colman were confirmed in the cast alongside him, with Euros Lyn as the director of the series. In July 2025, Rufus Sewell, Louis Partridge, Jamie Demetriou, Fiona Shaw, and Daryl McCormack were confirmed in the cast. The casting of Jasmine Blackborow in the role of Charlotte Lucas was announced in August 2025.

=== Filming ===
Principal photography began in the United Kingdom in July 2025, with first look images from filming released that month. Locations included Spitalfields in the East End of London, the Peak District in Derbyshire, and Rye, East Sussex, which is standing in as Meryton.

== Release ==
Pride and Prejudice is stated to premiere on 3 December 2026.
