= Ronald Walker (British politician) =

19th and 20th century British politician

Sir Ronald Fitz-John Walker (1880–26 March 1971) was a British Liberal Party politician.

Born in Mirfield, Walker worked for his family's blanket-making business. His brother Cyril was killed in World War I, leaving him to raise Cyril's family including nephew, politician John Walker

Sir Ronald Walker first stood for Parliament as a Liberal at the 1922 general election. He was elected to the party's National Executive the following year, then stood unsuccessfully for Parliament on five further occasions, the last being the 1935 general election. He contested Leeds North East, 1922 and 1923, Colne Valley, 1924, Dewsbury, 1929, Royton, 1931 and 1935. He was again adopted as Liberal candidate for Dewsbury in 1939 for an election that did not take place due to the outbreak of war.

Walker served as President of the Yorkshire Liberal Federation from 1947 to 1960, then later as honorary life president. In 1951, he was appointed the chairman of the Dewsbury Reporter newspapers. He served as President of the Liberal Party nationally in 1952, and was knighted the following year. He remained active in national liberal politics through the 1960s, but was critical of more radical elements in the party, calling for adherence to Gladstonian values. John followed him into Liberal politics, also becoming a prominent figure in the party.

He was the elder brother to Eric Walker (RAF officer), artist Hilda Annetta Walker and Whitby seafarer Dora Walker and uncle to artist Marie Walker Last.

Party political offices
| Preceded by Ramsay Muir | Chairman of the National Liberal Federation; 1933–1934 | Succeeded by Milner Gray |
| Preceded by Philip Fothergill | President of the Liberal Party; 1952–1953 | Succeeded by Lawrence Robson |
