= Lookout Point (production company) =

British television production company

Lookout Point Limited
- Company type: Television production company
- Founded: September 22, 2009; 16 years ago
- Founder: Simon Vaughan
- Headquarters: London, England, UK
- Area served: United Kingdom
- Key people: Laura Lankester; Will Johnston (Joint Chief Executive Officers)
- Owner: BBC Studios (2018–present)
- Website: lookoutpoint.tv

Lookout Point Limited is a British television production company based in London, United Kingdom. Lookout Point TV is a wholly-owned subsidiary of BBC Studios, producing content for the BBC and for other television channels in the United Kingdom.

== Shows produced ==
Adapted from the Lookout Point website.

- Renegade Nell - Disney+
- Devil's Peak - Mnet
- Happy Valley - BBC and AMC
- The Power of Parker - BBC
- Am I Being Unreasonable? - BBC and Hulu
- A Suitable Boy - BBC, Netflix and Acorn TV
- Last Tango in Halifax - BBC
- Gentleman Jack - BBC and HBO
- Les Misérables - BBC and Masterpiece
- Press - BBC and Masterpiece
- War & Peace - BBC and A&E Networks
- To Walk Invisible - BBC and Masterpiece
- Ripper Street - BBC and Amazon Studios
- The Collection - Amazon Studios
- Happy Valley - BBC
- Pride and Prejudice - Netflix
