= Eric Walker (RAF officer) =

- Born: 10 July 1896; Mirfield, Yorkshire, England
- Died: 11 April 1983 (aged 86); Christchurch, Dorset
- Burial place: Bournemouth, Dorset
- Military career
- Allegiance: United Kingdom
- Branch: British Army; Royal Air Force
- Service years: 1916–1919
- Rank: Lieutenant
- Nickname: "Jonnie"
- Units: West Riding Regiment; No. 18 Squadron RAF
- Conflicts: World War I • Western Front
- Awards: Distinguished Flying Cross

Lieutenant Eric Walker DFC (10 July 1896 – 11 April 1983) was a British World War I flying ace credited with six aerial victories.

== Military service ==
Walker was commissioned from cadet to second lieutenant on 19 December 1916, and served in the 4th Battalion, Duke of Wellington's (West Riding Regiment) (Territorial Force), until seconded to the Royal Air Force as an observer officer on 27 May 1918.

He then served as an observer/gunner in No. 18 Squadron flying in an Airco DH.4. He gained his first victories on 31 May 1918 with pilot Second Lieutenant J. Waugh, driving down out of control two Fokker Dr.I triplanes south of Armentières. On 28 July, with pilot Lieutenant John Gillanders, he destroyed a Fokker D.VII and another two-seater aircraft over Esquerchin. Finally, on 31 July, he and Gillanders accounted for two Fokker D.VII fighters (one destroyed and one driven down) over Brebières.

Walker was awarded the Distinguished Flying Cross, which was gazetted on 1 November 1918. His citation read:

Second Lieutenant Eric Walker.

"This officer has taken part in thirty-five bombing raids, ten photographic flights and twenty-one reconnaissances, many at low altitudes. He is a most efficient and keen observer who has rendered as such most valuable service. Moreover, he is a bold and determined fighter when attacked, and has accounted for four enemy machines."

He relinquished his commission on ceasing to be employed on 13 March 1919.

He was the brother of seafarer Dora Walker and artist Hilda Annetta Walker, and the uncle of the artist Marie Walker Last.
