= Jack Archer (actor) =

British-Irish actor

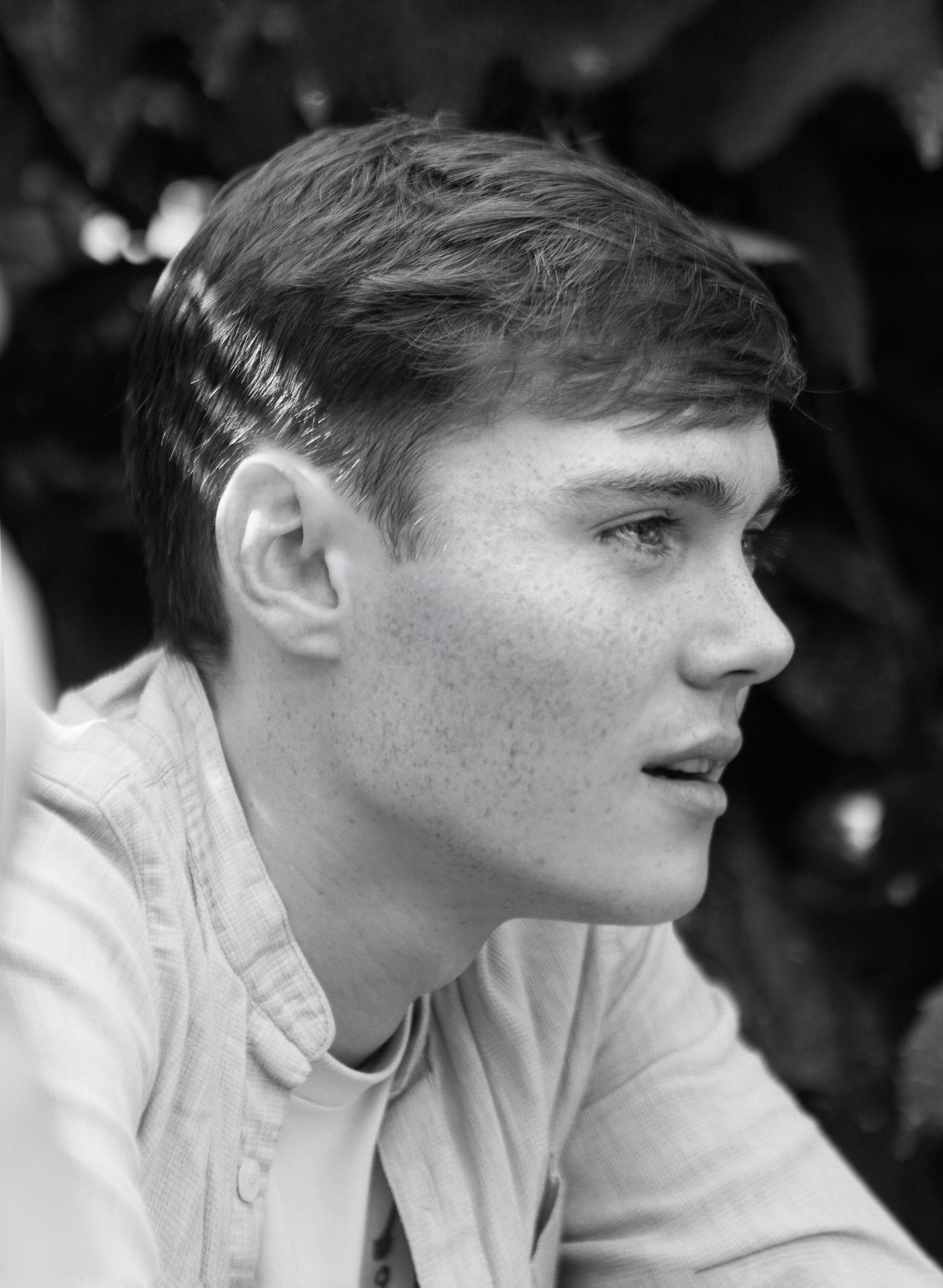
- Archer at the Park Theatre
- Education: Royal Welsh College of Music & Drama
- Occupation: Actor
- Years active: 2019–present

Jack Archer is a British-Irish actor. On television, he is known for his roles in the ITV series The Bay (2021) and the BBC Two series Marie Antoinette (2022–).

== Education ==
Archer attended the Royal Welsh College of Music and Drama where he trained as an actor.

== Career ==
Archer made his debut in the stage production Nivelli's War at the Lyric Theatre, Belfast which transferred to the New Victory Theater in New York. He received a 'Best Actor' nomination from The Stage Debut Awards for his performance as the lead role Ernst. Archer then played Hamilton in The Finborough Theatre's revival of Quaint Honour, staged once before in 1958, where he was nominated for the Offie for 'Best Male Performance in a Play. In 2020, he joined the lead cast of Torben Betts' Monogamy which toured the UK and went on to run at The Park Theatre in London. Archer has also starred in various other productions in London including Confessional at the Southwark Playhouse, Blue at the Gate Theatre and When The Sea Swallows Us Whole at The Vault Festival.

Archer made his screen debut as Jamie Marshbrook in the second series of The Bay on ITV. He then starred as Joseph in the 2021 film The Haunting of Alice Bowles written and directed by Philip Franks. He appeared in the tenth series of Call the Midwife as Michael Leeks, in a story following conversion therapy in Britain during the 1960s. Since 2022, Archer has starred in a television adaptation of Marie Antoinette's life written by Deborah Davis. Each 8-part series was part shot in Versailles, produced by Canal+ and Banijay, and aired on the BBC, PBS and Disney+. He plays the role of Count Louis-Stanislas-Xavier of Provence, who will become Louis XVIII after the French Revolution.

== Filmography ==
=== Television ===
Year	Title	Role	Notes	Ref.
2021	The Bay	Jamie Marshbrook	Series regular	
2021	Call the Midwife	Michael Leeks	Episode: "Series 10, Episode 4"	
2022–	Marie Antoinette	Provence	Series regular	
2024	Franklin	Thomas Grenville	Recurring role	
2025	Virdee	Alastair Boardman	Recurring role	
2026	Lynley	Frazer Moran	Episode: "This Body of Death"	
2026	MobLand	Fergus	Recurring role	

=== Film ===
Year	Title	Role	Notes	Ref.
2019	Shawn	Shawn	Short film	
2019	All Your Good Intentions	Eric	Short film	
2020	A Pound of Flesh	Smith	Short film	
2020	The Haunting of Alice Bowles	Joseph		
2022	The Pink Pill	Boy	Short film	
2023	Nights	JP	Short film	
