= Marie Antoinette (TV series) =

Historical drama television series

- Genre: Historical drama; Serial drama
- Created by: Deborah Davis
- Directed by: Pete Travis; Geoffrey Enthoven; Ed Bazalgette; Raf Reyntjens
- Starring: Emilia Schüle; Louis Cunningham; Jack Archer; Jasmine Blackborow; Gaia Weiss; James Purefoy; Marthe Keller; Roxane Duran; Nathan Willcocks; Crystal Shepherd-Cross; Caroline Piette; Oscar Lesage; Liah O'Prey; Yoli Fuller; Martijn Lakemeier; Margaux Billard
- Music by: Guillaume Roussel
- Countries of origin: France; United Kingdom
- Original language: English
- No. of seasons: 2
- No. of episodes: 16

Production
- Executive producers: Aude Albano; Margaux Balsan; Stéphanie Chartreux; Claude Chelli; Alban Etienne; Deborah Davis; Christophe Toulemonde
- Production locations: Versailles; Studios de Bry-Sur-Marne
- Production companies: Banijay Studios France; CAPA Drama; Les Gens

Original release
- Network: BBC Two (UK); Canal+ (France); Disney+ (Germany)
- Release: 29 December 2022 – 26 June 2025

Marie Antoinette is a historical drama television series created by Deborah Davis. It is produced by the BBC and Canal+ and based on the life of the last queen of France before the French Revolution, who was 14 years old when she became Dauphine of France upon her marriage to the heir apparent, Louis-Auguste.

The first series premiered in France on 31 October 2022 and in the UK on 29 December, and consists of eight episodes. The series premiered in the United States on 19 March 2023 on PBS. German actress Emilia Schüle plays the title role. A second series was released in 2025 on various services, including the BBC, PBS, Canal+ and Disney+.

== Cast and characters ==
=== Main ===
- Emilia Schüle as Marie Antoinette
- Louis Cunningham as Louis XVI
- Jack Archer as Provence (the future Louis XVIII)
- Jasmine Blackborow as Lamballe
- Oscar Lesage as Chartres (eventually Louis Philippe II, Duke of Orléans)
- Roxane Duran as Joséphine
- Liah O'Prey as Yolande (Duchess of Polignac)
- Martijn Lakemeier as Fersen
- Yoli Fuller as Saint-Georges
- Crystal Shepherd-Cross as Adelaïde
- Caroline Piette as Victoire

=== Series 1 ===
- James Purefoy as Louis XV
- Gaia Weiss as Madame du Barry
- Marthe Keller as Marie-Thérèse d'Autriche
- Nathan Willcocks as Mercy
- Jonas Bloquet as Joseph II
- Laura Benson as Madame de Noailles
- Maximilien Seweryn as Rohan, French Roman Catholic priest and ambassador to Austria (House of Habsburg)
- Philippe Tlokinski as Pierre Beaumarchais
- Nicola Perot as Duc d'Aiguillon
- Zelda Rittner as Rose Bertin

=== Series 2 ===
- Freya Mavor as Jeanne
- Guy Henry as Vergennes
- James Northcote as Calonne
- Jessica Clark as Félicité
- Alexander Bhat as Villette
- Selva Rasalingam as Cagliostro
- Callum McGowan as la Motte
- Patrick Albenque as Breteuil
- Margaux Billard as Nicole d'Oliva

== Production ==
=== Development ===
After the final season of Versailles aired, it was announced that Canal+ had commissioned Deborah Davis to write an eight-part series centred on Marie Antoinette. Alongside Banijay Studios and CAPA Drama the French production company planned to create an English language series with the aim to distribute to a wide international audience in a similar fashion to Versailles. In October 2021, it was announced that the BBC had pre-bought the series and the British broadcaster would be part of the production and distribution process. Vogue and Variety reported that the series is being created by an all-female writing team and would offer a "feminist take" on Marie Antoinette's life.

On 17 March 2023, Variety revealed that a second season had been commissioned with Davis as creator and a writing team led by Louise Ironside alongside Charlotte Wolf, Francesca Forristal and Andrew Bambfield. Ed Bazalgette will direct the first four episodes. "The upcoming season will portray how the royal couple at the height of their power faced an unprecedented financial crisis. The incessant attacks of Provence and Chartres against the royal couple stirred up the hatred of the nobles with disastrous consequences".

=== Casting ===
Casting was announced in September 2021 with Schüle attached to play the lead role. She was joined by an international cast including Louis Cunningham, Jack Archer, Jasmine Blackborow, Gaia Weiss, James Purefoy, Marthe Keller, Roxane Duran, Crystal Shepherd-Cross, Caroline Piette, Oscar Lesage, Liah O'Prey, Jonas Bloquet, Nathan Willcocks, Paul Bandey, Laura Benson and Yoli Fuller.

=== Filming ===
In September 2021 it was announced filming had begun. Variety and Deadline reported that alongside the studios of Bry-Sur-Marne, filming would take place at locations that include the Châteaux of Versailles, Vaux-le-Vicomte, Fontainebleau, Lésigny, Champs and Voisins.

== Release ==
Marie Antoinette premiered on the French network Canal+ in October 2022. The following month the series was distributed through BBC First in Australia and released on streamers Foxtel and Binge. Banijay also announced PBS had pre-bought the series with a planned spring 2023 release. The American premiere was later confirmed to be 19 March 2023.

The series made its UK debut on BBC Two and BBC iPlayer on 29 December 2022. The series was available in Germany on Disney+ from 21 June 2023.

== Episodes ==
=== Series 1 ===
No.	Title	Directed by	Written by	UK air date	US air date
1	"The Slap"	Pete Travis	Deborah Davis	29 December 2022	19 March 2023
As a young girl, Marie Antoinette is forced to leave Austria for an arranged marriage with the Dauphin of France. Antoinette struggles with the rules and etiquette expected at Versailles, enforced and reprimanded by Madame Noailles. The Count of Provence resents his Dauphin brother and the two quarrel whilst Marie Antoinette strikes up a friendship with Italian Princess Lamballe. The Duke of Choiseul is serving as the prime minister for Marie Antoinette's grandfather-in-law Louis XV. Choiseul is the architect of the Franco-Austrian alliance who also handpicked Marie Antoinette to marry the heir apparent of France.
2	"Rival Queens"	Pete Travis	Louise Ironside	5 January 2023	26 March 2023
Madame du Barry gives lessons in seduction to Marie Antoinette. However, du Barry perceives Antoinette as a rival for the affections of the reigning king Louis XV! Victoire and Adélaïde want their widower father Louis XV to marry royal widow Lamballe instead of continuing romance with du Barry whom they despise.
3	"Pick a Princess"	Pete Travis	Deborah Davis & Avril Russell	12 January 2023	2 April 2023
The head of the royal house and their immediate family including Toinette spend their fête champêtre (country feast) at the Palace of Fontainebleau. Contrary to Madame du Barry's plans to marry Provence, Victoire and Adélaïde want their nephew to marry the princess Josephine from the House of Savoy. Marie Antoinette learns of this plan and the escalating hostilities threaten her relationship with both the King and her husband.
4	"Queen of France"	Pete Travis	Chloe Moss	19 January 2023	9 April 2023
Louis XV falls ill. He reminds his grandson that he was five when he became king. Rose Bertin becomes Toinette's fashion merchant. Louis XV dies from smallpox.
5	"Rebel Queen"	Geoffrey Enthoven	Deborah Davis	26 January 2023	16 April 2023
Louis XVI is now king; however, there is friction as he chooses to ignore his wife's political advice. Antoinette is pleased with Petit Trianon. She hires Saint-Georges as her composer. When Choiseul tells the king that he is too young to join the council meetings, Louis XVI selects Maurepas as his senior advisor. Pierre Beaumarchais serves as the new king's spymaster. Tension rise further as Provence and Joséphine threaten to deliver an heir. However, Josephine suffers a miscarriage.
6	"Deus ex Machina"	Geoffrey Enthoven	Louise Ironside	2 February 2023	23 April 2023
Still childless after seven years, Antoinette's brother Joseph comes to Versailles in an attempt to save the royal marriage. To Joseph's dismay, Louis XVI is very coy with Toinette and won't "practice" with a prostitute. Louis XVI won't take up a mistress like his predecessor grandfather Louis XV.
7	"The Ostrich Bitch"	Geoffrey Enthoven	Chloe Moss	9 February 2023	30 April 2023
Marie Antoinette falls pregnant but explicit pamphlets challenging the legitimacy of her unborn child appear at Versailles. The castle is locked down and investigated in order to uncover the traitor.
8	"Queen of Hearts"	Geoffrey Enthoven	Deborah Davis	16 February 2023	7 May 2023
After conversations with Benjamin Franklin, Louis provides support towards the American War of Independence. Marie Antoinette spends her time at the Petit Trianon where she rekindles her romance with Fersen.

=== Series 2 ===
No.	Title	Directed by	Written by	UK air date	US air date
1	"The Worst Winter"	Ed Bazalgette	Unknown	8 May 2025	23 March 2025
2	"A Poison Pen"	Ed Bazalgette	Unknown	15 May 2025	30 March 2025
3	"Treacherous Legacy"	Ed Bazalgette	Unknown	22 May 2025	6 April 2025
4	"The Pursuit of Happiness"	Ed Bazalgette	Unknown	29 May 2025	13 April 2025
5	"Enemies Assemble"	Raf Reyntjens	Louise Ironside & Francesca Forristal	5 June 2025	20 April 2025
6	"Hated, Humbled, Mortified"	Raf Reyntjens	Louise Ironside & Charlotte Wolf	12 June 2025	27 April 2025
7	"Madame Deficit"	Raf Reyntjens	Louise Ironside & Andrew Bampfield	19 June 2025	4 May 2025
8	"The End of the Beginning"	Raf Reyntjens	Louise Ironside	26 June 2025	11 May 2025

== Reception ==
On the review aggregator website Rotten Tomatoes, 60% of 10 critics' reviews are positive, with an average rating of 6.5/10. The Guardian gave the series four out of five, complimenting Schüle's performance and commenting "Strange, funny, grotesque in places ... this drama from the writer of the Olivia Colman movie [The Favourite] portrays the French queen as a naive and playful teenager – and it's hugely entertaining". Both TV Times and Weekend magazine gave five out of five, with the latter stating the series "weaves an extravagant tapestry of excess and intrigue".

The Telegraph gave three out of five, stating "after eight effervescent hours [Marie Antoinette] concludes in dynastic triumph" but "this is obviously not history". The Financial Times also gave three out of five, concluding that "for all the fastidious details of the ambitious production, Marie Antoinette can at times feel like an indulgent serving of cake, when what we crave is a bit more of the bread-and-butter of storytelling". The Evening Standard was more critical with a two-out-of-five review describing it as "a standard traditional period drama weighed down by expectation".

Variety featured the show as one of its critic picks for Best International Series of 2022, describing Schüle's performance as "riveting".
