= Young Ones (film) =

- Teaser poster
- Directed by: Jake Paltrow
- Written by: Jake Paltrow
- Produced by: Michael Auret; Tristan Lynch; Jake Paltrow
- Starring: Nicholas Hoult; Elle Fanning; Michael Shannon; Kodi Smit-McPhee
- Cinematography: Giles Nuttgens
- Edited by: Matt Mayer
- Music by: Nathan Johnson
- Production companies: Subotica Entertainment; Spier Films
- Distributed by: Screen Media Films
- Release dates: 18 January 2014 (Sundance Film Festival); 17 October 2014 (United States)
- Running time: 100 minutes
- Countries: South Africa; Ireland
- Language: English

Young Ones (UK title Bad Land: Road to Fury) is a 2014 action science fiction film directed and written by Jake Paltrow. The film stars Nicholas Hoult, Elle Fanning, Michael Shannon and Kodi Smit-McPhee. The film had its world premiere at 2014 Sundance Film Festival on 18 January 2014. The film was released on 17 October 2014 in the United States.

== Plot ==
In a crumbling United States, experiencing severe drought, people kill for water. Ernest Holm lives with his son, Jerome, and daughter, Mary, in a small house, next to a field. His wife, Katherine, is permanently hospitalized, after an accident. At the hospital, she can walk while wired to a special frame. While everyone else has left the area, Ernest and his family remain, as Ernest believes that the land will grow once more, if only there is irrigation. Ernest gets water for his family by delivering supplies to the "water men," who hold a government-backed monopoly to distribute water extracted from deep wells. After his mule breaks its legs, and he has to kill it, Ernest goes to Sam Lever's auction house, where he wins an auction for a robotic carrier machine called, "Sim." Ernest's winning bid beats the offers of Sam's son, Flem, a young, troubled man who has been seeing Mary without Ernest's consent.

One morning, Ernest finds the Sim is missing, and he goes looking for it. When he gets to the water men, he is accused of stealing their supplies. He finds Flem transporting the stolen supplies with the Sim, planning to sell them at the border. Ernest takes Flem captive, ties him to the machine, and aims to take the supplies back to the water men. When they stop due to dehydration, Flem convinces Ernest to temporarily parch their thirst with the liquor they are transporting. Wanting to escape, Flem throws a stone at Ernest's head, killing him, and frames the machine for Ernest's death.

The family's farm is revealed to have originally belonged to Flem's father. He saves it by helping obtain illegal irrigation from the water men, then marries Mary. But after finding out Ernest had overwhelming debts to repay to a bank, which is now going to repossess the farm, Flem tricks his friend, Robbie, into selling his baby behind his wife's back. Robbie is killed and the Sim is lost in an altercation with the buyers. However, the machine returns limping and mangled to its manufacturer, who resides in a city across the border. The owner, Calvin Hooyman, reaches Jerome at the Holm residence, via CB radio, informing him about the machine.

Jerome crosses the border with the help of Anna, a girl who lives with the "settlers," people fighting back against the government's regulations, considered to be terrorists. Jerome meets Calvin, who gives the repaired Sim back to him, and shows Jerome how the machine's laser sensor behaves like a rudimentary video recorder. Jerome plays the recording and finds the truth about Ernest's death. Arriving home before Flem, Jerome questions him as to how the machine found its way home, since Flem claimed to have sold it in order to repay the debt. Flem's lies only infuriate Jerome more, but at first, he takes no action. Instead, he lures Flem out in the desert by posing as Robbie via radio and letters, ultimately causing Flem to fall into a pit trap and break his legs. As Flem cries for help, Jerome, who has been secretly following him, comes to the pit's mouth. Flem realizes that Jerome knows the truth about what happened to Ernest. He tries to elicit Jerome's mercy, but Jerome coldly shoots him in the head. Jerome ultimately decides to withhold these events and the circumstances of Ernest's death from Mary, who is pregnant with Flem's child. Brother and sister remain in the house, planning to bring their mother there from the hospital, now that they can pay for her brace wires, and hoping the baby will be a girl.

The film is divided into three chapters, named after the main character in each of them: "Ernest Holm", "Flem Lever", and "Jerome Holm", respectively.

== Cast ==
- Michael Shannon as Ernest Holm
- Nicholas Hoult as Flem Lever
- Elle Fanning as Mary Holm
- Kodi Smit-McPhee as Jerome Holm
- Robert Hobbs as Caleb Moore
- David Butler as Sam Lever
- Aimee Mullins as Katherine Holm
- Christy Pankhurst as Robbie
- Alex McGregor as Sooz
- David Clatworthy as Calvin Hooyman
- Liah O'Prey as Anna
- Carel Nel as Bandit
- Andy McPhee as Foreman
- Ben Horowitz as Water Guard

== Production ==
Nicholas Hoult, Elle Fanning, Michael Shannon and Kodi Smit-McPhee joined the cast on 7 February 2013. Giles Nuttgens is the director of photography while Tristan Lynch and Michael Auret are the producers. On 13 May 2014 Screen Media Films acquired the U.S. rights to the film.

=== Filming ===
The shooting of the film began in February 2013 at Namaqualand, Northern Cape, South Africa, and shot until 15 March.

== Marketing ==
The first trailer was released on July 6, 2014. Another U.S. trailer was released on July 23.

== Release ==
The film was released on 17 October 2014 in the United States.

The film later appeared on Amazon Prime Video under the title Bad Land: Road to Fury.

== Reception ==
Rotten Tomatoes, a review aggregator, reports a 47% approval rating, based on 36 critical reviews with the average rating of 5.2/10. The critical consensus states: "Visually compelling but narratively barren, Young Ones adds little to the dystopian Western genre." Metacritic rated it 47/100 based on 13 reviews. Geoff Berkshire of Variety wrote, "Jake Paltrow's visually rich, dramatically spare sci-fi Western bogs down in its primal tale of murder and revenge." David Rooney of The Hollywood Reporter wrote, "There's little refreshment on offer in this parched lo-fi sci-fi drama, despite the distinctive element of its retro rural setting." Jeannette Catsoulis of The New York Times called it a "spare but potent melodrama" that focuses on male violence. Robert Abele of the Los Angeles Times wrote that it "gets lost amid a mishmash of film styles".
