= The Phone Call =

2013 film

- Film poster
- Directed by: Mat Kirkby
- Written by: Mat Kirkby; James Lucas
- Starring: Sally Hawkins
- Edited by: Lizzy Graham
- Release date: 20 October 2013
- Running time: 20 minutes
- Country: United Kingdom
- Language: English

The Phone Call is a 2013 British short drama film. It was directed by Mat Kirkby and written by Kirkby and James Lucas. It won the Oscar for Best Live Action Short Film at the 87th Academy Awards.

== Plot ==
The film stars Sally Hawkins as Heather, a crisis hotline counsellor trying to dissuade Stanley (Jim Broadbent), an unseen distraught caller, from a suicide attempt following the death of his wife.

== Cast ==
- Sally Hawkins as Heather
- Jim Broadbent as Stanley
- Edward Hogg as Daniel
- Prunella Scales as Joan
