= Liah O'Prey =

Spanish-born Irish-French actress

- Born: 15 December 1999 (age 26); Barcelona, Spain
- Occupation: Actress
- Years active: 2011–present

Liah O'Prey (born 15 December 1999) is a Spanish-born Irish-French actress. She began her career as a child actress and speaks English, French, Spanish and Catalan.

== Early life ==
O'Prey was born in Barcelona to an Irish father and a Corsican mother from Pietralba. After completing high school, she enrolled at a drama school in Paris.

== Career ==
At the age of 11, O'Prey made her feature film debut in Juan Carlos Medina's 2012 multilingual horror Painless as Inès. She played Anna in the 2014 Irish-South African science fiction film Young Ones. In 2015, O'Prey appeared in two French television films: My Son as Héloïse and Eyes Open as Clara. The following year, she starred as Laetitia in West Coast. She played a younger version of Dolores Fonzi's character in Black Snow (2017).

O'Prey played Mary Livingston in the 2018 historical drama Mary Queen of Scots and Virginie in the 2020 Netflix film Madame Claude. She then landed the recurring roles of Tatiana in the French series Mortel and Beatrice, an Irish exchange student, in Damien Chazelle's miniseries The Eddy, both on Netflix. In 2021, O'Prey starred as Julia the Elder in the Sky Atlantic and Italia historical series Domina and made a guest appearance as the titular character in the Capitaine Marleau episode "Claire obscure". In September 2021, it was announced O'Prey had joined the main cast of the upcoming BBC and Canal+ series Marie Antoinette. She also starred as Joan of Arc in the 2024 documentary television series Martin Scorsese Presents: The Saints.

== Filmography ==
=== Film ===
Year	Title	Role	Notes
2011	The Murder of Otilia Ruiz	Young Otilia	Short film
2012	Painless	Teen Inès	
2014	Young Ones	Anna	
2016	West Coast	Laetitia	
2017	Black Snow	Young Sabrina	
2018	Mary Queen of Scots	Mary Livingston	
2019	La jauría	Tania	
2020	Madame Claude	Virginie	
2022	A Man of Action	Anne	
TBA	Awakened Dreams	Aspara	

=== Television ===
Year	Title	Role	Notes
2015	My Son	Héloïse	Television film
2015	Eyes Open	Clara	Television film
2019–2021	Mortel	Tatiana	5 episodes
2020	The Eddy	Beatrice	Miniseries
2021–2023	Domina	Julia	Main role
2021	Capitaine Marleau	Claire Duret	Episode: "Claire obscure"
2022	Et la montagne fleurira	Estelle	Miniseries; 5 episodes
2022–present	Marie Antoinette	Yolande	12 episodes
2024	Martin Scorsese Presents: The Saints	Joan of Arc	Anthology
