= William Gilbert Foster =

British painter

William Gilbert Foster RBA
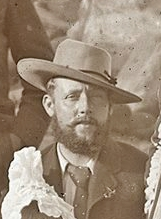
- Born: 9 May 1855; Birkenhead, England
- Died: 3 July 1906 (aged 51); Leeds, England
- Education: Leeds School of Art
- Known for: Painting

William Gilbert Foster (9 May 1855 – 3 July 1906) was a British painter.

Senior member of the Staithes group of artists, he had a studio at Runswick Bay for many years. He painted landscapes and rural genre in oil and watercolours. Exhibited regularly at the British Royal Academy of Arts (forty times) and at the Royal society of British. The Staithes group or Staithes School was an art colony of 19th-century painters based in the North Yorkshire fishing village of Staithes, of about 25 artists who often worked in plein air.

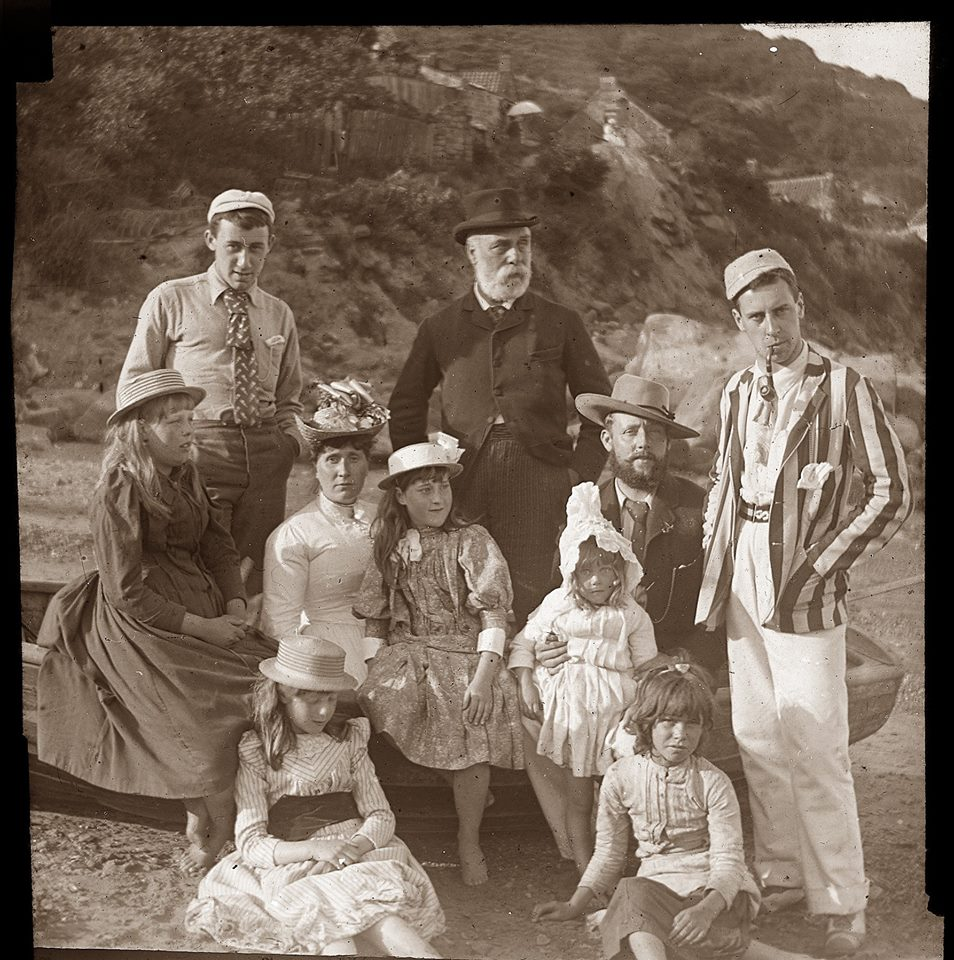
William Gilbert Foster family photo. His father with white beard, his wife and four daughters and two friends

== Life and career ==
He was the son of William Foster (born 1830 in Glossop, Derbyshire) a portrait painter and bookseller from Birkenhead who moved to Leeds and established a studio when Gilbert Foster was a child. Foster was educated at the Leeds Grammar School prior to receiving training at his father's studio. He was an art master at Leeds Grammar School and later an under-master at Leeds School of Art. He also established his own studio and taught pupils privately.

He purchased a cottage in Runswick Bay, in 1890, and spent most summers there painting. He took his students from Leeds School of Art (one of whom was Hilda Annetta Walker) to the area for sketching expeditions and was very supportive of the younger artists. William had four daughters and a son. One of his daughters, Dorothea, was an artist herself and, at seventeen, had her first painting accepted by the Royal Academy. William Gilbert Foster was living in Halton, Leeds, in the United Kingdom Census 1901 (although he's filled in the census just as Gilbert Foster). His wife was there as a widow in 1911.

He exhibited in all the major venues including Liverpool, Manchester, Birmingham, the Royal Institute of Oil Painters, the Royal Society of British Artists and at the Royal Academy, where his first work was accepted in 1876. His paintings are in the permanent collections of several public art galleries including Kirkleatham, Whitby, Leeds, Bradford, Huddersfield, Hull and Manchester

== Gallery ==
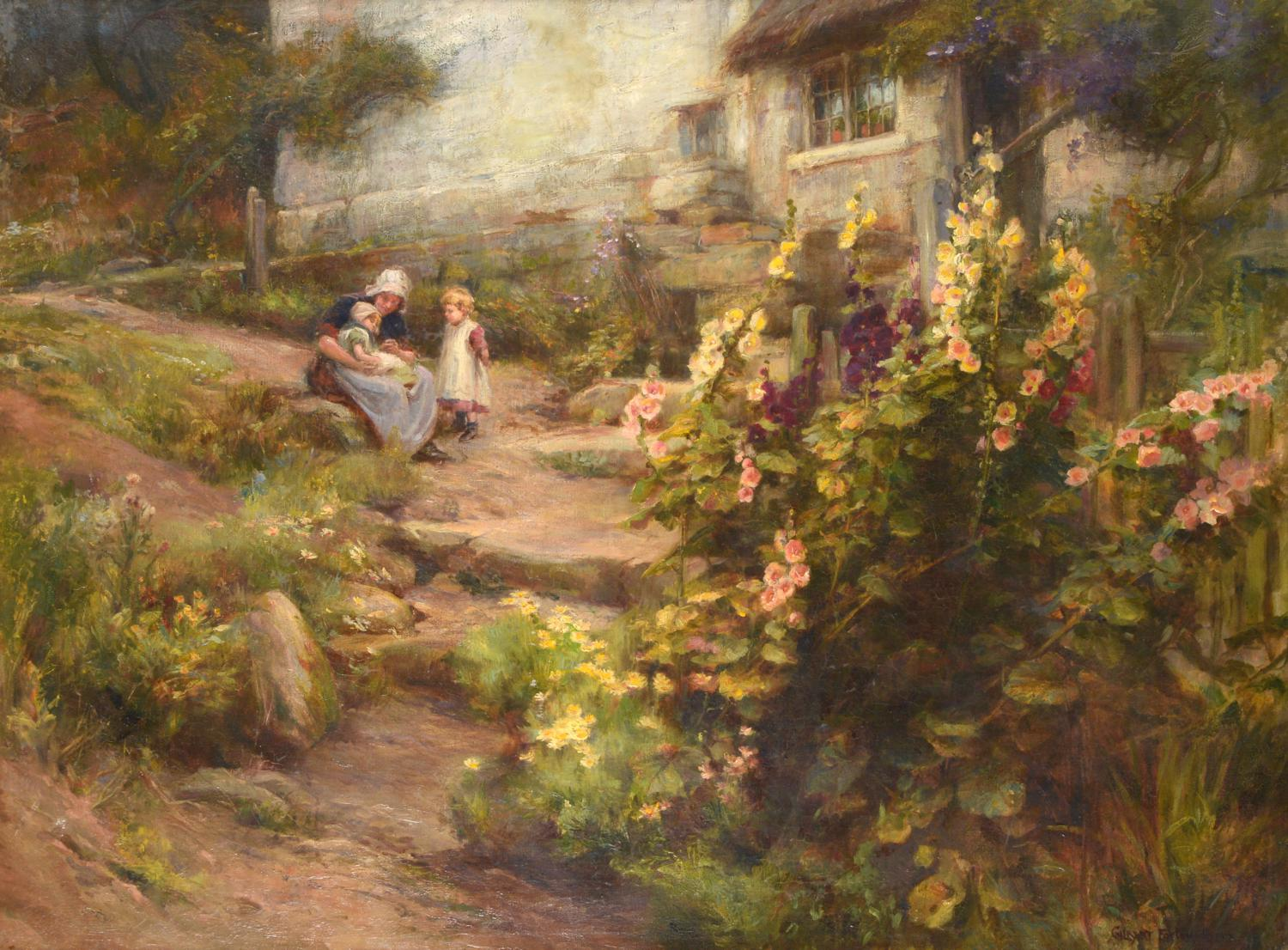
Mother and children

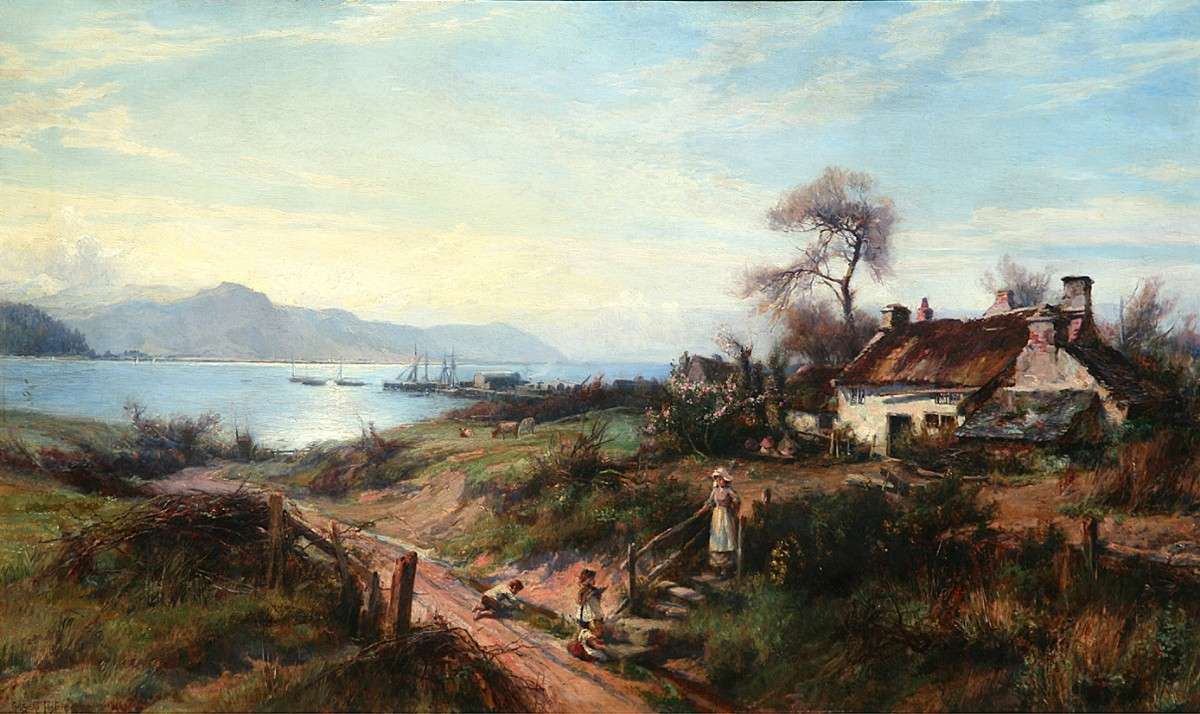
Cottage with family near the sea

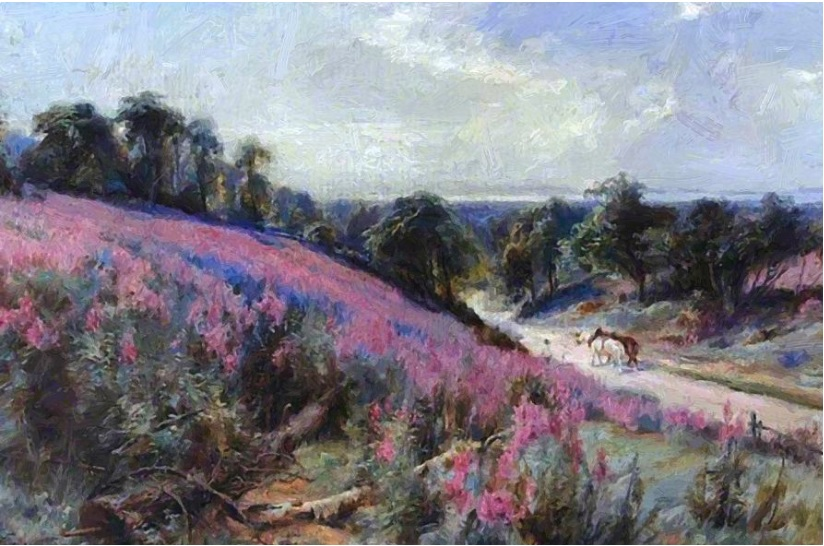
Wildflowers in Yorkshire
