= Moss & Freud =

2025 film by James Lucas

- Theatrical release poster
- Directed by: James Lucas
- Written by: James Lucas
- Produced by: Maile Daugherty; Norman Merry; Matthew Metcalfe
- Starring: Ellie Bamber; Derek Jacobi; Will Tudor; Jasmine Blackborow; Tim Downie; Milan Borich
- Cinematography: Maria Ines Manchego
- Edited by: Nick Carew
- Music by: Karl Sölve Steven
- Production companies: GFC Films; Lipsync
- Distributed by: Vertigo Releasing
- Release dates: 10 October 2025 (London); 29 May 2026 (United Kingdom)
- Running time: 100 minutes
- Countries: United Kingdom; New Zealand
- Language: English
- Box office: $35,921

Moss & Freud is a 2025 biographical drama film written and directed by James Lucas, starring Ellie Bamber as English model Kate Moss and Derek Jacobi as painter Lucian Freud.

The film premiered at the BFI London Film Festival on 10 October 2025. It was released in cinemas in the United Kingdom on 29 May 2026 by Vertigo Releasing.

== Premise ==
In London in 2002, supermodel Kate Moss agrees to pose for a painting by aging artist Lucian Freud. After sittings over the course of many months, the resultant painting was auctioned in 2005 for £3,928,000.

== Cast ==
- Ellie Bamber as Kate Moss
- Derek Jacobi as Lucian Freud
- Jasmine Blackborow as Bella Freud
- Tim Downie as David Dawson
- Will Tudor as Jefferson Hack

== Production ==
The film is written and directed by James Lucas and is produced by GFC Films with Matthew Metcalfe as producer with Kate Moss as an executive producer with the support of the Lucian Freud Archive.

The cast is led by Ellie Bamber as Moss, with Derek Jacobi as Lucian Freud. The cast also includes Jasmine Blackborow (as Bella Freud), Tim Downie and Will Tudor.

== Release ==
Moss & Freud premiered at the BFI London Film Festival on 10 October 2025. The film was released in cinemas in the United Kingdom on 29 May 2026 by Vertigo Releasing.

Moss & Freud received five nominations at the 2026 New Zealand Screen Awards, held in Auckland on 19 November 2026, winning three awards: Best Performance by an Actor in a Male Role: Feature (Derek Jacobi), Best Picture Finishing: Feature (Alana Cotton) and Best Makeup Design: Feature (Deidre Cowley). The film was also nominated for Best Editing: Drama: Feature (Nick Carew) and Best Cinematography: Feature Film (Maria Ines Manchego).
