= Painless (film) =

- Original release poster displaying the initial release title of Insensibles
- French: Insensibles
- Directed by: Juan Carlos Medina
- Written by: Luiso Berdejo; Juan Carlos Medina
- Starring: Àlex Brendemühl; Tómas Lemarquis; Ilias Stothart
- Cinematography: Alejandro Martínez
- Edited by: Pedro Ribeiro
- Music by: Johan Söderqvist
- Production company: Les Films d'Antoine; Tobina Film; Fado Filmes
- Release date: September 8, 2012 (TIFF)
- Running time: 100 minutes
- Countries: Spain; France; Portugal
- Languages: Catalan; Spanish; German; English

Painless (French: Insensibles) is a 2012 fantasy horror film and the feature film directorial debut of Juan Carlos Medina, who also is the co-writer. The film is a joint production of Spain, France, and Portugal and had its world premiere on 8 September 2012 at the Toronto International Film Festival. Painless is set in Catalonia and follows two different story lines, one set during the Spanish Civil War and one set in the modern day.

The film, translated by Andrey Efremov, was shown in Vologda, Russia, as part of the 5th VOICES International Film Festival in July 2014.

== Synopsis ==
The film's premise is partially set in 1931 during the Spanish Civil War, where a group of children are brought to a monastery turned hospital for medical testing. None of the children are capable of feeling physical pain, something that Dr. Holzmann (Derek de Lint) hopes to remedy with his procedures. However at the same time his colleague Dr. Carcedo (Ramon Fontserè) believes that the children would be better off locked up in his asylum in Canfranc. One young patient named Benigno (played at different ages by Ilias and Mot Stothart) stands out in particular, as he proves to be exceptionally intelligent but also easily prone to violent outbursts - something that Carcedo believes is further proof of his beliefs. Benigno while in his cell realizes that a little girl he met and cared for is in the cell next to his but the walls are thick. One day he steals a spoon and digs everyday for 4 years until he makes a big enough hole to see her and eventually reach her. Holzmann's plans of finding a remedy for the children is never brought to fruition, as the hospital is besieged and taken over by several different military forces.

The movie is also set during modern day, where David (Àlex Brendemühl) has woken up in a hospital to discover that he had been in a serious automobile accident. His pregnant wife (who had been riding in the car with him) did not survive the crash but the doctors did manage to save the baby, who is now being housed in another floor of the hospital. To add to his misery, the doctors inform David that scans of his body have revealed that he has lymphoma and requires a bone marrow transplant if he is to have any chance of survival. David turns to his parents in hopes that one of them can donate their marrow, only to learn that he was adopted. From there, David sets out to find his biological parents, a process that inevitably leads him to the hospital that was run by Holzmann and Carcedo. He eventually discovers that his father is Benigno, who was renamed Berkano (Tómas Lemarquis) by one of the military forces, and that Berkano had become a prolific torturer for this new regime, still kept in his original cell no. 17 of the monastery, that had been turned into prison. David goes into room no.17 but there's no one there. He then sees a hole in the floor, he climbs down and it leads through a tunnel and opens up into a cavern filled with lit candles. There he sees a dead woman who has blue eyes, like his own. He figures out that this was his mother(she was), he also notices that she looks very preserved, like she's just sleeping. While David is looking at her, Berkano walks up behind him, He is bald, with no hair anywhere on his body, his body is oddly still muscular(even though he hasn't eaten in years) and he's aged but not as he should have for the time that has passed. He should be dead but he is not. He attacks David with a knife and is about to kill him. But when he looks into David's eyes, he realizes they are the same eyes as the woman he loves. He then knows that David is their son. Berkano backs up and accidentally knocks over a candle and the area where David's mother is laying catches fire. Berkano picks up David's mother and stands there holding her as the flames engulf them both and spreads to David, but of course Berkano feels no pain and neither does his son. Father, mother and son stand reunited as they burn in the flames, with father and son looking into the other's eyes.

== Cast ==
- Àlex Brendemühl as David
- Tómas Lemarquis as Berkano
- Ilias Stothart as Child Benigno
- Mot Stothart as Adolescent Benigno
- Derek de Lint as Dr. Holzmann
- Ramon Fontserè as Dr. Carcedo
- Sílvia Bel as Judith
- Bea Segura as Magdalena
- Juan Diego as Adán Martel Mayor
- Félix Gómez as Adán Martel joven
- Irene Montalà as Anaïs
- Àngels Poch as Clara Martel
- Ariadna Cabrol as María
- Bruna Montoto as Inés Niña
- Liah O'Prey as Inés Adolescente

== Reception ==
Critical reception for Painless has been mostly positive. Reviewers for The Hollywood Reporter praised the film, with one reviewer drawing favorable comparisons to Guillermo del Toro's The Devil's Backbone and Pan’s Labyrinth. Twitch Film also praised the film, writing "Absolutely beautifully shot and performed, Painless is filled with interesting ideas and images that establish Medina - with his first feature here - as a director of uncommon visual skills." Dread Central and Ain't It Cool News were more mixed in their reviews, and Ain't It Cool News wrote that "PAINLESS has some superb sections with child actors at their best and has an evocative examination of what humanizes the heart. Unfortunately, it does not focus enough on this and becomes too interested in dealing a didactic ‘sins of the fathers’ tract that jars with its more timeless magic."
