= James Lucas (screenwriter) =

British-New Zealand screenwriter and film director

- Born: High Wycombe, England
- Occupations: Screenwriter, director
- Years active: 2013–present

James Lucas is a British/New Zealand screenwriter and film director. He is best known for writing and producing the British short drama film The Phone Call (2013), the 2021 New Zealand feature film Whina, and the 2026 biopic Moss & Freud.

== Early life and education ==
James Lucas was born in High Wycombe, England. He grew up in Christchurch, New Zealand, before moving back to London.

He graduated from film school at London Metropolitan University.

== Career ==
After being a writer/researcher at Talkback Thames and an assistant editor at Tank Magazine, Lucas worked at Ridley Scott’s RSA Films for a number of years.

He wrote and produced the short drama film The Phone Call (2013), for which he won the Academy Award for Best Live Action Short Film at the 87th Academy Awards.

Lucas made several more short films, before writing the 2021 New Zealand feature film Whina, starring Rena Owen, which won a number of awards.

His latest film is the Kate Moss biopic Moss & Freud, starring Ellie Bamber as Moss and Derek Jacobi as Lucian Freud, which was scheduled to be released in UK cinemas on 29 May 2026.

== Other activities ==
Lucas has played in art-rock bands and composed music for clients such as Wallpaper Magazine, HSBC, and Moov.

He was a lead actor in the 2012 London Olympics Opening Ceremony created by Danny Boyle.
