= John Gillanders =

World War I Military Aviator

John Gordon Gillanders
- Born: 26 August 1895; London, Ontario, Canada
- Died: 15 May 1946 (aged 50); Ontario, Canada
- Military career
- Allegiance: George V of the British Empire
- Branch: Flying service
- Rank: Lieutenant
- Units: No. 103 Squadron RAF, No. 18 Squadron RAF
- Awards: Distinguished Flying Cross

Lieutenant John Gordon Gillanders (1895–1946) was a World War I flying ace credited with five aerial victories.
