= Forum Club =

The Forum Club was a London Club for women. Located at 6 Grosvenor Place, it was founded in 1919 as The London Centre for Women's Institute Members, and lasted into the early 1950s. A number of suffragettes and early feminists were members, including Elizabeth Robins, Mary Sophia Allen and Sybil Thomas, Viscountess Rhondda.

The Forum Club first opened its doors at 6, Grosvenor Place, Hyde Park, London, on 1 November 1919. It became one of the most successful ‘ladies only’ clubs of its era, with over 1,600 members. It was a meeting point and a social launch pad for many great female authors, artists, speakers, public figures, and political activists, including some early suffragettes, including Emmeline Pankhurst.

It was conceived by a number of the former members of another, ladies’ club, the Lyceum, some of whom considered the latter "too bluestocking" and were unhappy about it selling the old clubhouse to the RAF Club and moving to the more expensive and smaller townhouse at 138 Piccadilly.

Alice Williams, Francis Abbott, and a number of others, along with the Committee of the National Federation of Women's Institutes (NFWI), decided to launch the Forum Club as the London meeting centre for the regional Women's Institute (WI) groups and prominent accomplished professional women to provide mutual support and to promote their achievements.

The clubhouse in Grosvenor Place was the former residence of Sir Henry Campbell-Bannerman, Prime Minister from 1905-1908. It is a perfect example of the architectural and interior style of Sir Ernest George and Harold Peto, whose partnership was responsible for the distinctive Victorian splendour of many stately homes and mansions. During the First World War the building was seconded by the government and housed Princess Christian’s Hospital for Officers.

Princess Marie Louise, granddaughter of Queen Victoria, was the Club President from 1919 to 1925. The princess oversaw the reciprocal agreements abroad, maintaining the club's affiliation with 40 notable establishments worldwide – from Monaco to South Africa and Australia. Queen Elizabeth the Queen Mother visited the club on four occasions. The Princess Royal, Lady Mountbatten, the Crown Prince of Norway, Anne Chamberlain, the wife of British Prime Minister Neville Chamberlain and General de Gaulle were also guests of honour at the club.

In 1952, the lease in Grosvenor Place expired, and the club had to look for a new home, which it found at 42 Belgrave Square. On 27 May 1953, the club re-opened its doors, adding an inner yard tennis court to its facilities. The membership of WI in 1948-49 was exceeding 40,000, providing a stable flow of members to the Forum Club. The club actively participated in many events organised by the W.I. and produced its own concerts, talks, exhibitions, and contests. "Home and Country", a WI members’ magazine with over 100,000 subscribers, maintained great national coverage and marketed the club events and campaigns.

Sadly, by 1953, generational frictions within W.I. membership became noticeable, also, between 1948 and 1956, poor health and a few unexpected deaths among the NFWI and Forum Club committees resulted in them giving up the lease in Belgrave Square, which was sold to the actor David Niven. That same year, the clubhouse was featured as the home to Mr Phileas Fogg in the Hollywood production of "Around the World in 80 Days".

In 1957, the club founder and President from 1925 to 1938, Alice Williams, died at the age of 94. There were a number of club meetings in early 1958, but the club felt "out-dated" to the younger women joining many other 'professional and business ladies' establishments across the country, none of which, however, provided the same unique networking and mutual support opportunities between women of different classes of society as once did the Forum Club.

As well as accommodation for members (and their maids), the club contained a dining room, a lounge, a photographic darkroom, a salon which could by hired for exhibitions, a bridge room, a billiard room, a library, and a hairdressing room.
