= Dover Marine War Memorial =

Statue in Dover, England

Coordinates: 51°6′48″N 1°18′57″E

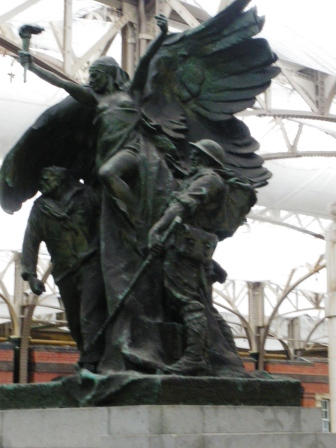
The Dover Marine War Memorial

Dover Marine War Memorial stands in the old Dover Marine Station in the Western Docks, Dover, England. The port has effectively been closed for several years; it is currently used as a berthing station for cruise liners, and is only open when a liner is in dock.

== Description ==
The memorial was created in remembrance of South Eastern and Chatham Railway employees who served during World War I. The Railway had 5,222 individuals who served of whom 556 had died.

Standing on a granite plinth is a group of four figures cast in bronze, a sailor, a soldier, a bugler to the rear and rising above and between them the winged "Victory", a woman, holding aloft the "torch of truth". The memorial also consists of a wall inscribed with the names of those who fell in World War I. Those remembered are the 556 men of the South Eastern and Chatham Railway killed in the latter War and 626 men of the Southern Railway who died fighting in World War II.

The war memorial was unveiled on 28 October 1922 by Cosmo Bonsor the Chairman of the South Eastern and Chatham Railway Managing Committee and the sculptor was William Charles Holland King. In his career, King worked closely with Gilbert Bayes and was the sculptor of the statue of Robert Owen in Newtown, Powys, finished after Bayes had died. King also sculpted the Great War memorial in St. Peter's Collegiate Church, Wolverhampton, and some statuary in the niches of the tower of All Souls College in Oxford.

=== Central bronze ===
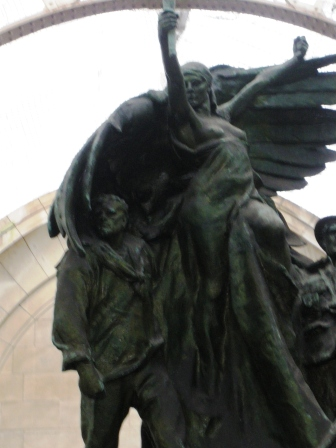
View of the central bronze sculpture.

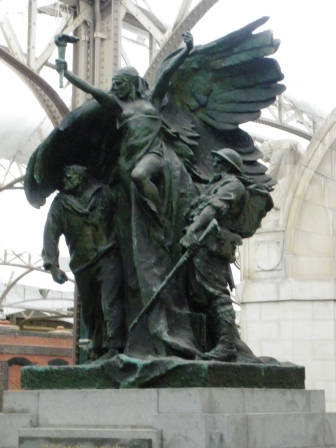
The central bronze.

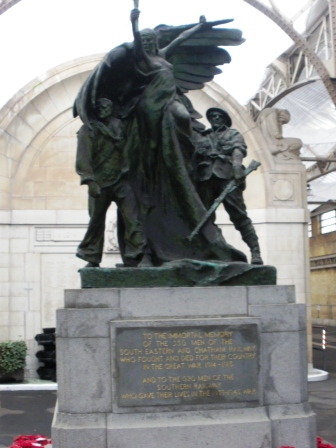
Another view of the central bronze.

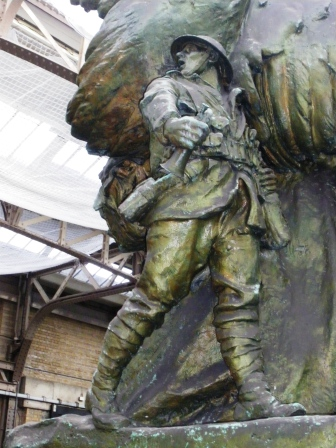
Another detail from the central bronze.

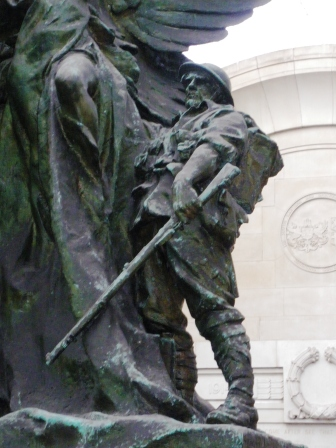
A detail from the central bronze sculpture.

=== Crouching figure ===
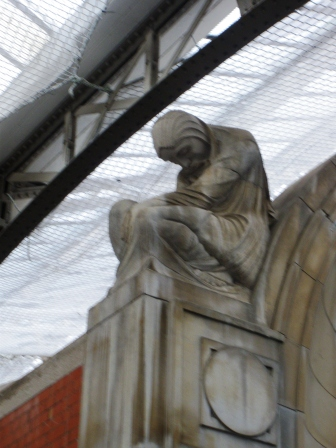
View of the crouching figure at the top left of the memorial wall.

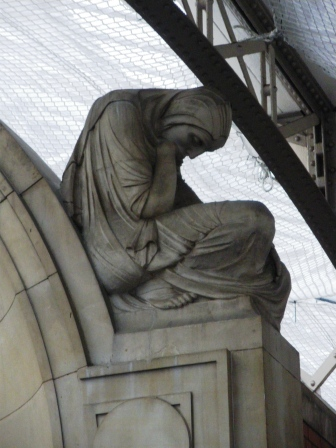
The crouching figure at top right of the memorial wall.

=== Inscriptions ===
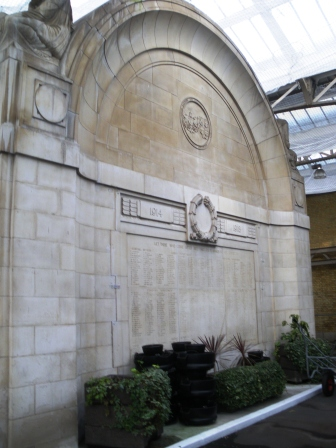
View of the inscribed wall at the rear of the memorial

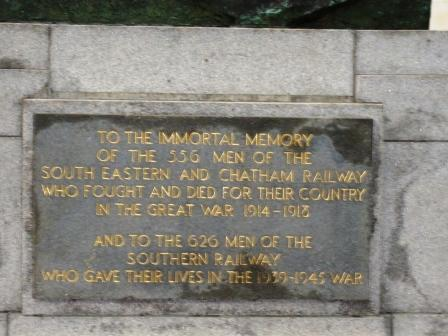
Inscription at the base of the central sculpture.

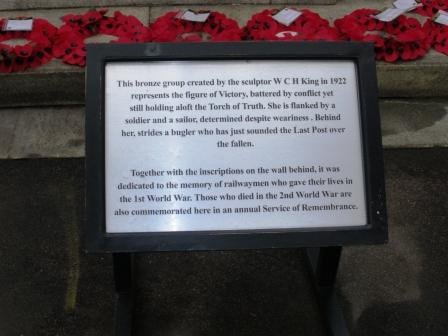
Another plaque explains the reason for the memorial.
