= Ellie Bamber =

English actress (born 1997)

- Bamber in 2026
- Born: Eleanor Elizabeth Bamber; 2 February 1997 (age 29); Surrey, England
- Education: Eagle House School, Hawley Place School and Wellington College
- Occupation: Actress
- Years active: 2009–present

Eleanor Elizabeth Bamber (born 2 February 1997) is an English actress. She won third prize at the Ian Charleson Awards for her 2017 performance in The Lady from the Sea at the Donmar Warehouse. On television, she is known for her roles in the BBC series Les Misérables (2018), The Trial of Christine Keeler (2019–2020), and The Serpent (2021), and the Disney+ series Willow (2022). Her films include Nocturnal Animals (2016).

== Early life ==
Bamber was born in Surrey, England, and has a younger brother, Lucas. Her father, David, works in finance and her mother, Zoe, is her manager. She was educated at Eagle House School, Hawley Place School (Hurst Lodge School), where she was awarded a drama scholarship, and Wellington College for Sixth Form.

== Career ==
=== Theatre ===
At the age of 12, Bamber became the youngest member of the Players' Theatre Club. At the age of 13 she was chosen by Sir Trevor Nunn to play the role of ‘Young Jenny’ in his production of Aspects of Love at the Menier Chocolate Factory.

After roles in TV and film, she returned to musical theatre when she was selected for a lead role as the disruptive teenager ‘Dinah Lord’ in High Society at The Old Vic, London. Directed by Maria Friedman, this was the last production under Kevin Spacey’s tenure as Artistic Director. Following the run, in November 2015, she was nominated for the ‘Evening Standard Theatre Award’ for ‘Best Newcomer in a Musical’. In 2017 she played Hilde in The Lady from the Sea, directed by Kwame Kwei-Armah at the Donmar Warehouse, and her performance won third prize at the Ian Charleson Awards.

=== Television and film ===
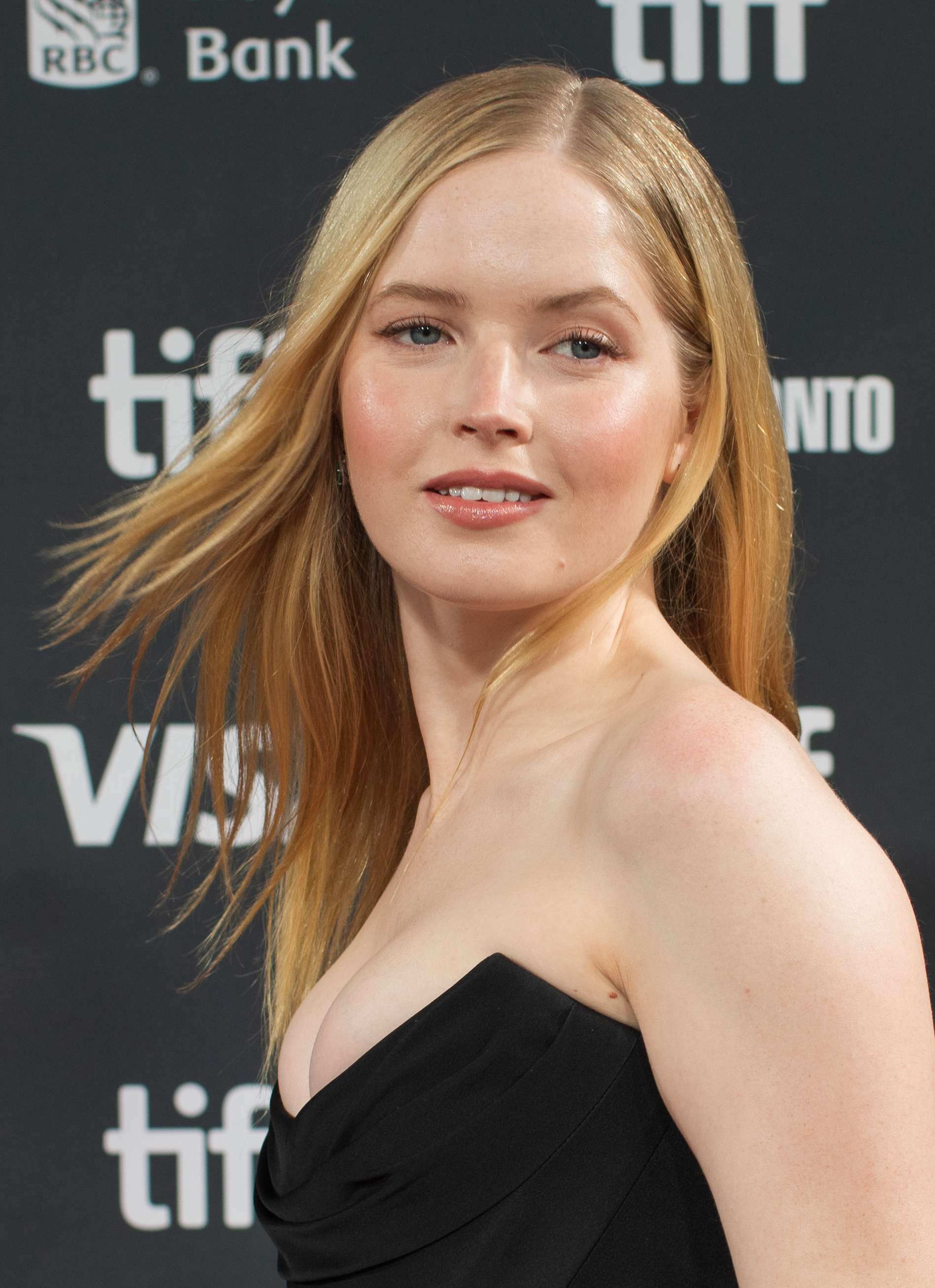
Bamber at the 2024 Toronto International Film Festival

Bamber's film debut was in the BBC film The Falling (2014). In the same year she starred as Lydia Bennet, the youngest of the Bennet sisters in Pride and Prejudice and Zombies, starring alongside Lily James, Douglas Booth, Sam Riley and Matt Smith. In 2015, Bamber was chosen as one of the British Film Institute and Screen Daily – Screen Stars of Tomorrow. In 2016, she appeared in Tom Ford's Nocturnal Animals, playing the daughter of Jake Gyllenhaal and Isla Fisher's characters, in a film also starring Amy Adams. Also that year, she filmed the feature film Extracurricular Activities.

In 2017, she also filmed High Resolution based on the book Taipei by Tao Lin. The same year, Bamber appeared in the music video for Shawn Mendes' song "There's Nothing Holdin' Me Back". In 2018 Bamber was in The Nutcracker and the Four Realms, alongside Keira Knightley and Morgan Freeman. In 2018, Bamber played the lead role of Mary in the feature film The Seven Sorrows of Mary. In 2019, (Note: While Les Misérables as a whole first aired in 2018, only those episodes which first aired in 2019 would star Bamber.) Bamber played the adult Cosette in the BBC One television series Les Misérables with Dominic West and Olivia Colman. Later in the year (December), she would star as Mandy Rice-Davies in The Trial of Christine Keeler, another BBC One series, alongside Sophie Cookson and James Norton. In 2021, she starred in yet another BBC One series, The Serpent, in which she played Angela Knippenberg (later Kane). In 2022, she starred as Dove/Elora Danan in Willow, the Disney+ sequel to the 1988 film of the same name.

== Filmography ==
=== Film ===
Key
†	Denotes films that have not yet been released

Year	Title	Role	Notes	Ref.
2014	The Falling	Schoolgirl		
2016	Pride and Prejudice and Zombies	Lydia Bennet		
2016	Nocturnal Animals	India Hastings	Nominated—San Diego Film Critics Society Award for Best Performance by an Ensemble	
2018	The Nutcracker and the Four Realms	Louise		
2020	The Show	Becky Cornelius		
2023	Red, White & Royal Blue	Princess Beatrice "Bea"		
2024	William Tell	Bertha		
2025	Words of War	Elena Milashina		
2025	Ambleside	Lucy Gladwell		
2025	Moss & Freud	Kate Moss		
2026	The Face of Horror	Beatrice		
2026	Ebenezer	Belle		
2027	Animal Friends †	Patsy	Post-production	
TBA	Red, White & Royal Wedding †	Princess Beatrice "Bea"	Post-production	
TBA	Halftime Hero †	Penny	Filming	

=== Television ===
Year	Title	Role	Notes	Ref.
2012	A Mother's Son	Olivia	TV miniseries, 2 episodes	
2015	The Musketeers	Martine	Episode: "The Prodigal Father"	
2016	The Fashion Fund	Herself	Episode: "Winner Announced"	
2019	Les Misérables	Adult Cosette	Main role, 3 episodes	
2019–2020	The Trial of Christine Keeler	Mandy Rice-Davies	Main role, 6 episodes	
2021	The Serpent	Angela Knippenberg	8 episodes	
2022	Willow	Dove/Elora Danan	Main role	

== Theatre credits ==
Year	Title	Role	Theatre	Notes	Ref.
2009	Players' Theatre Victorian Music Hall 75th anniversary show	Betty	Players' Theatre Club	Singing role	
2010	Aspects of Love	Young Jenny	Menier Chocolate Factory		
2015	High Society	Dinah Lord	The Old Vic		
2017	The Lady from the Sea	Hilde	Donmar Warehouse	Bamber won Third Prize at the Ian Charleson Awards	
2025	The Line of Beauty	Catherine	Almeida Theatre		

== Awards and nominations ==
Year	Award	Category	Work	Result	Ref.
2015	61st Evening Standard Theatre Awards	Newcomer in a Musical	High Society at The Old Vic	Nominated	
2018	Ian Charleson Awards		The Lady from the Sea	Third	
2018	Orlando Film Festival	Best Actress	High Resolution	Won	
2022	Soho House Awards	Best Actress	Trial of Christine Keeler / The Serpent	Won	
