= Marie Walker Last =

British artist (1917–2017)

Marie Walker Last (14 March 1917 – 25 March 2017) was a British artist working in London in the late 1950s and early 1960s before returning to continue painting in her Yorkshire home until her death in 2017. She developed her own style of Tachisme abstract painting.

== Early life ==
Marie Walker Last was born to Ethel and Hubert Walker, a textile manufacturing family in Cleckheaton. Her father was an art collector and the young Marie was inspired by an artist aunt Hilda Annetta Walker to study art in Leeds. In 1953 she joined a group of amateur painters on a painting course in Bruges, led by the landscape painter, Jack Merriott. Under his tutelage, she became a member of the Northern Federation of Artists and attended their summer painting schools during the mid 1950s. Here she met leading artists of the time, including Robert Medley and Terry Frost, they encouraged Marie to apply to Chelsea School of Art, where in 1956 she was accepted.

== Career ==
=== London ===
Walker Last left Yorkshire to take up her place at the Chelsea College of Arts where she was taught by Vivian Pitchforth in the late 1950s. The gallery director Denis Bowen became a close friend and mentor and organised her first London exhibition at the New Vision Gallery. There she worked closely with avant garde European artists - including members of the Zero. She had a lifelong friendship with Robert Graves, the artist César Domela - who shared a studio with Piet Mondrian -and Domela's family and the artist Nancy Horrocks and her husband Major General Sir Brian Horrocks. Walker Last shared a studio with the Guyanese artist Aubrey Williams for several years before returning to Yorkshire to marry local solicitor Tom Last. She joined the Women's International Art Club and exhibited in Britain and overseas with them. She also became a member of the Free Painters and Sculptors and the Artists International Association, exhibiting her work with them on a regular basis.

=== Yorkshire ===
Moving to Ilkley Walker Last bought an empty chapel in Menston to use as her studio. She met Arthur Kitching, the curator of the Manor House Museum, Ilkley, who encouraged her painting and in 1964 offered her the chance of her first Yorkshire solo exhibition. Subsequent solo exhibitions in Yorkshire were held at the Goosewell Gallery, Menston, 1969; the Park Square Gallery, Leeds, 1974; and a first major retrospective exhibition of her work at Dean Clough Gallery in 1991. Cartwright Hall, Bradford, also held two retrospective exhibitions of her work, the last in 2001. There were major exhibitions of her work at the Camden Arts Centre, London in 1980, where she won First Prize in the Druce Constable Award and at Leighton House, London, 1981. An exhibition of her studio contents was held in June 2018 courtesy of the Trustees at Manor House Museum in Ilkley.

Examples of Walker Last's work has been purchased for permanent collections, including Granada Television, and the Halifax Building Society and in the publicly accessible collections of the York, Leeds and Bradford Universities, plus The Open University, and in the Bradford Museums and Galleries permanent collection. She was awarded an honorary degree by the University of Bradford in 1996. On her death the major part of the personal art collection of Tom and Marie Last were left to the Stanley and Audrey Burton Gallery including works by Alfred Wallace and Ben Nicholson which were acquired with the help of Tom's colleague the Yorkshire solicitor and art collector Cyril Reddihough.
