= Jeanne du Barry (film) =

2023 biographical film

- Theatrical release poster
- Directed by: Maïwenn
- Written by: Maïwenn; Teddy Lussi-Modeste; Nicolas Livecchi
- Produced by: Maïwenn; Johnny Depp; Pascal Caucheteux; Gregoire Sorlat
- Starring: Maïwenn; Johnny Depp; Benjamin Lavernhe; Pierre Richard; Melvil Poupaud; Pascal Greggory
- Cinematography: Laurent Dailland
- Edited by: Laure Gardette
- Music by: Stephen Warbeck
- Production companies: Why Not Productions; France 2 Cinéma; France 3 Cinéma; Les Films du Fleuve; IN.2 Film; La Petite Reine; Les Films de Batna; Impala Productions; Red Sea Film Foundation
- Distributed by: Le Pacte (France); IN.2 Film Miracle Communications (United Kingdom and Ireland)
- Release dates: 16 May 2023 (Cannes); 16 May 2023 (France); 19 April 2024 (United Kingdom and Ireland)
- Running time: 116 minutes
- Countries: France; Belgium; United Kingdom
- Language: French
- Budget: $22.4 million
- Box office: $14.9 million

Jeanne du Barry is a 2023 French-language historical drama film directed, co-written and produced by Maïwenn and starring herself and Johnny Depp in the leading roles. It also stars Pierre Richard, Benjamin Lavernhe, Noémie Lvovsky, Pascal Greggory, Melvil Poupaud, and India Hair. Its plot centres on the life of Jeanne Bécu, who was born as the illegitimate daughter of an impoverished seamstress in 1743 and went on to rise through the Court of Louis XV to become his last official mistress.

Jeanne du Barry is a co-production between France, Belgium and the United Kingdom. It was produced by Why Not Productions and Depp's IN.2 Film, and is distributed by Le Pacte. With its budget of $22.4 million, Jeanne du Barry was one of the most expensive French films of 2023, one of only three French films with a budget over 10 million euros. The film had its world premiere as the opening film at the Cannes Film Festival on 16 May 2023 and was released theatrically in France on the same day by Le Pacte. The film received mixed reviews upon release. It is the 9th highest-grossing French film worldwide in 2023 and received one of the longest standing ovations at the Cannes Film Festival, lasting 7 minutes.

== Plot ==
Jeanne Vaubernier is the illegitimate child of a Catholic monk and a cook named Anne. Jeanne is sent to a convent at an early age. There, she is expelled for reading erotic books. Upon moving to Paris, Jeanne becomes a reader to a widow named Madame de la Garde. Here, Jeanne honed her wit to the level of aristocrats. However, Madame de la Garde expels Jeanne for sleeping with her sons.

Jeanne excels in libertinage and charms wealthy lovers as a courtesan. Next, she meets a French count ("Comte") named "Jean". Jean's courtier friend duke Richelieu wants to introduce Jeanne to the king of France.

In 1768, Queen Marie has just died after 43 years as the consort queen. The following year, Louis XV's daughters protest that their father has taken in the new mistress Jeanne as they are still mourning their mother. Since the official queen is deceased and the king doesn't remarry, Jeanne becomes the first lady at Versailles. Jeanne spends a lot of time at Versailles instead of Parc-aux-Cerfs.

Jeanne selects Zamor as her page. Louise of France, the king's youngest legitimate daughter, leaves Versailles to become a nun after taking exception to her father's mistress Jeanne. Stephen Francis, Duke of Choiseul is the prime minister of France when the 16-year-old Dauphin marries the 15-year-old Marie Antoinette in 1770. Mercy is ambassador of the Archduchy of Austria, Holy Roman Empire, to France.

The king comes down with smallpox. Held in contempt by the king's legitimate family and the Catholic clergy, Jeanne is swiftly expelled from Versailles upon the king's death. After the French Revolution, Zamor betrays Jeanne who is executed on 8 December 1793 for her association with the royals and being a countess, even though she was a commoner before becoming a courtesan.

== Cast ==
- Maïwenn as Jeanne du Barry, a commoner who becomes the mistress and favourite of King Louis XV
  - Emma Kaboré Dufour and Loli Bahia respectively portray Jeanne as a child and a teenager
- Johnny Depp as Louis XV, the King of France
- Benjamin Lavernhe as Jean-Benjamin de La Borde, the King's premier valet de la chambre and a close confidant of Jeanne's
- Pierre Richard as Louis François Armand de Vignerot du Plessis, 3rd Duke of Richelieu, a high-ranking member of the French court who introduces the King to Jeanne
- Melvil Poupaud as Count Guillaume du Barry, Jeanne's partner and later husband
- Pascal Greggory as Emmanuel-Armand de Richelieu, duc d'Aiguillon, the Duke of Richelieu's nephew
- India Hair as Adélaïde de France, the King's eldest surviving legitimate daughter and his fourth overall
- Suzanne de Baecque as Victoire de France, the King's fifth legitimate daughter
- Capucine Valmary as Louise de France, the King's seventh legitimate daughter
- Diego Le Fur as the King's grandson, the future Louis XVI. He is only referred to as the Dauphin (the royal heir) in the film
- Pauline Pollmann as Marie Antoinette, the future Queen of France, who is referred to as the Dauphine as the wife of the Dauphin
- Micha Lescot as Florimond Claude, Comte de Mercy-Argenteau, Austria's ambassador to France
- Noémie Lvovsky as Countess Anne de Noailles, a lady-in-waiting
- Marianne Basler as Anne Bécu, Jeanne's mother
  - Erika Sainte portrays a younger version of the character
- Laura Le Velly as Sophie de France, the King's sixth legitimate daughter
- Robin Renucci as Roch-Claude Billard-Dumonceaux (written Dumousseaux in the film) who employed Jeanne's mother as a domestic cook and had Jeanne educated in a convent
- Caroline Chaniolleau as Madame de la Garde, an elderly widow who employed Jeanne as a companion
- Patrick d'Assumçao as Étienne François, duc de Choiseul, a political rival to the Duke of Richelieu and his nephew
- Ibrahim Yaffa and Djibril Djimo as Zamor, respectively as a child and a teenager, who was gifted as a child to Jeanne by the King as her page
- Teddy Lussi-Modeste as Germain Pichault de La Martinière, the King's surgeon
- Éric Denize as Anne-Charles Lorry, one of the King's doctors
- Raphaël Quenard as the Grand Chamberlain of France
- Grégoire Oestermann as Abbot Louis-Nicolas Maudoux, the King's confessor
- Coralie Russier as Béatrix de Choiseul-Stainville, the Duke of Choiseul's sister
- Aurélie Vérillon as Adélaïde Labille-Guiard
- Luna Carpiaux and Marie Bokillon as Élisabeth Vigée Le Brun, respectively as a teenager and an adult

== Production ==
=== Development ===
In an interview with Harper's Bazaar France, Maïwenn revealed that she had been wanting to direct a film about Madame du Barry since 2006, after seeing Sofia Coppola's film Marie Antoinette. She was particularly drawn to the character of Madame du Barry, played by Asia Argento, and soon after, started reading biographies about her. For the next ten years, Maïwenn played with the idea of one day directing a period film, whose protagonist would be Madame du Barry, remaining still very unsure about it, fearing that she would not be able to create a film comparable to others made on the subject. After reading many biographies about du Barry and watching a lot of period films such as Stanley Kubrick's Barry Lyndon, Sofia Coppola's Marie Antoinette and Albert Serra's The Death of Louis XIV, Maïwenn started creating the outline for her own film. She reached the conclusion that these three films, which she loves, have in common the fact that they use minimal dialogue.

Maïwenn wrote the film with a French actor in mind, whose name she has not disclosed. When she presented the script to him after three years of writing, he declined in a matter of minutes, claiming, according to Maïwenn, that "cinema is dead" and that there was "only Netflix left". She then offered the role to another French actor, whose health problems prevented him from playing the role. After this disappointment, Maïwenn was advised to create a list of actors she loves, no matter their origin. She did so, and the first actor on the list was an American, who seemed accessible to her, but was not interested. The second actor was Johnny Depp, who was sent the script at a time when Maïwenn had lost hope that the project would materialise.

She first approached Depp and offered him the role of Louis XV before Christmas 2019. Without reading the script himself, Depp agreed immediately, after his assistant and friend, Stephen Deuters, who is also a screenwriter and producer, read it and fell in love with it. After losing his libel trial against The Sun, in November 2020, Maïwenn was unsure whether Depp would still be on board for the project. She contacted him and found out that he feared she would not want him in the film after the trial. Maïwenn reassured him that the film would not continue without him and that he was the only person she thought could play the role.

In January 2022, it was officially announced that Depp was cast as Louis XV. In May 2022, Louis Garrel, Pierre Richard, and Noémie Lvovsky were cast in undisclosed roles, while Wild Bunch sold the film for distribution during the 2022 Cannes Film Festival. By July 2022, the film was revealed to have been acted in French, with Netflix handling distribution in France; Benjamin Lavernhe, Melvil Poupaud, Pascal Greggory, and India Hair were cast.

=== Filming ===
Principal photography started on 26 July 2022 in Versailles and other regions of Paris for 11 weeks. On 10 August 2022, the first teaser image of Depp in the role of Louis XV was shared by Why Not Productions. Filming wrapped in mid-October 2022. On 1 November 2022, Wild Bunch International unveiled the key territories which had acquired rights for the drama. Another image of Depp in the role was shared on the same day.

Maïwenn gave her first interview about the film to Le Journal du Dimanche on 31 December 2022. In it, she mentions that her staging for the film "is neither pop nor rock", unlike Sofia Coppola's Marie Antoinette, but that she has taken liberties with it and that she is expecting "purists" to criticise her. She further commented on Depp's ability to transform into a character, calling him "a real chameleon" who really likes transformation. Regarding the dialogue and the fact that Depp was acting for the first time in French, Maïwenn commented that her film does not use dialogue extensively and that Depp's expressiveness was highly impressive to her, likening it to that of a silent film actor.

For the first time in her career, Maïwenn decided to use 35 mm film cameras to shoot a motion picture, using Stanley Kubrick's film Barry Lyndon as a template for what she wanted to achieve visually. Directing the film while also playing the role of one of its protagonists, Madame du Barry, was challenging for Maïwenn, who decided, at the end of shooting, that she never would again act in a film that she is directing.

=== Financing and budget ===
In early January 2023, it was announced that the Red Sea Film Foundation was financially backing the film, with Saudi film producer and CEO of the foundation Mohammed Al Turki complementing the film and stating that it is an "incredibly unique and ambitious biographical feature and a testament to our commitment to supporting new talent and collaborating with world-class writers, directors and producers". Maïwenn and Depp were present at the 2023 Red Sea International Film Festival, on 1 December 2023, for a special screening of the film and a Q&A session.

On 30 March 2023, it was announced that Jeanne Du Barry was part of 33% of all the approved FIF films in 2022, which were either directed or co-directed by a woman and that it was one of only three French films with a budget of over 10 million euros. The budget of the film was announced to have been $22.4 million.

== Release ==
On 5 April 2023, it was officially announced that Jeanne du Barry would have its world premiere as the opening film out of competition at the 2023 Cannes Film Festival on 16 May 2023. The film received a 7-minute standing ovation at the Cannes premiere and was theatrically released in France on the same day, 15 months in advance of its scheduled streaming release on Netflix in France. When asked about his decision to choose Jeanne du Barry as the opening film at the festival, during an interview with Deadline on 13 April 2023, Cannes Festival Director Thierry Frémaux responded by saying that it is a "beautiful film", "a success" and that "Johnny Depp is magnificent in it".

On 15 April 2024, the film premiered in the United Kingdom. Maïwenn and Depp were present at the premiere and walked down the red carpet. Vertical Entertainment distributed the film in the United States and Canada on 2 May 2024.

== Reception ==
=== Box office ===
As of 15 August 2025, Jeanne du Barry had grossed $14.9 million in various international markets.

The film initially opened in 650 cinemas across France, grossing nearly $4.1 million, from more than 550,000 tickets sold in the first two weeks, thus becoming the best showing in a decade for a Cannes opening-night film since The Great Gatsby in 2013.

=== Critical reception ===
Jeanne du Barry received an average rating of 3.1 out of 5 stars on the French website AlloCiné, based on 34 critics. On the review aggregator website Rotten Tomatoes, 48% of 84 critics' reviews are positive, with an average rating of 5.3/10. The website's consensus reads: "Heavily coiffed and perfumed as to cover up its plebeian status, Jeanne Du Barry waltzes aimlessly through a noble attempt at vindicating its eponymous femme." Metacritic, which uses a weighted average, assigned the film a score of 48 out of 100, based on 23 critics, indicating "mixed or average" reviews.

Catherine Balle, writing for Le Parisien, gave the film 4.5 out of 5 stars writing that Maïwenn succeeds, calling the film "classic but very contemporary and totally inhabited". French newspaper Le Journal du Dimanche gave the film 4 out of 5 stars, writing: "The film strikes the heart with its tragic romanticism, lyricism and chiseled dialogues that convey a fierce modernity. Faced with the couple formed by Maïwenn and Johnny Depp, in osmosis, Benjamin Lavernhe recalls the extent of his talent." Eric Neuhoff, writing for Le Figaro, gave the film 3 out of 4 stars calling it "brilliant, with the most pleasing effect". He added that Maïwenn "deserves the applause of the assembled court". La Presse's Rana Moussaoui praised Depp's French and his expression, writing: "With an almost perfect French, Depp impresses especially with his facial, loving, amused or imperious expressions, throughout this film shot in several castles in France and in the studio." Première's Thierry Chèze gave Jeanne du Barry 3 out of 5 stars, praising Maïwenn's direction and her and Depp's performance in the film, writing: "If Maïwenn seduces with her playful interpretation crossed by heartbreaking moments of Jeanne, Johnny Depp, with his charisma, his ability to say so much with a simple look or body movement, reigns over the film without crushing anyone." Additionally, he wrote that Depp's performance as Louis XV "will be remembered".

Geoffrey Macnab of The Independent gave the film 4 out of 5 stars, calling it "a subtle and well-crafted costume drama with plenty of satirical bite" and praising Depp's performance as Louis XV. Macnab wrote: "His Louis is a taciturn, melancholy but commanding figure with a dark side". Kevin Maher writing for The Times also gave the film 4 out of 5 stars, praising Maïwenn's performance. The Irish Examiner gave the film 4 out of 5 stars and called it "delightfully irreverent". In a positive review for Variety, Peter Debruge wrote that "Maïwenn taps into the emotional core of a most unusual relationship, such that we mourn how and why it eventually dissolves". Although praising Depp's French, he found him to not appear "engaged" in the role and "uncomfortable". Ben Croll, writing for IndieWire, gave the film the grade B−, writing that "the film burns hot and bright — and quickly flames out". Jo-Ann Titmarsch of The Evening Standard gave the film 2 out of 5 stars and was praising of the visuals, costumes and of Depp's performance, but criticised some of the characterizations and the screenplay.
