= Red Sea Film Festival Foundation =

Cultural organization in Saudi Arabia

Red Sea Film Festival Foundation مؤسسة مهرجان البحر الأحمر السينمائي
- Formation: 2018
- Type: Non-profit cultural organization
- Purpose: Cultural
- Chairwoman: Jomana Alrashid
- President: Mohammed Al Turki

The Red Sea Film Festival Foundation (Arabic: مؤسسة مهرجان البحر الأحمر السينمائي) is a non-profit cultural organization registered in Saudi Arabia. The foundation is chaired by Jomana Alrashid while the president of the foundation is the Saudi producer Mohammed Al Turki.

== History ==
The Red Sea Film Festival Foundation was founded by Badr bin Abdullah Al Saud, the Saudi Minister of Culture.

== Responsibilities ==
The foundation organizes the Red Sea International Film Festival, an annual film festival launched in 2019 and held in Jeddah, western Saudi Arabia. The festival was initially scheduled to start in 2020, but was delayed because of the COVID-19 pandemic. Instead, the inaugural film festival was held in December 2021. The foundation is also provides education and grants to the local film industry. Additionally, the foundation has provided funding for international productions such as the 2023 French film Jeanne du Barry and the 2024 Italian film Modì, Three Days on the Wing of Madness.

== Red Sea Labs ==
The foundation runs the Red Sea Labs which provides support for African and Asian filmmakers through training, mentorship and grants.

As of 2025, the Labs’ programs include a directors lab, a series lab and the feature films program, which was originally known as the Lodge.

In collaboration with TorinoFilmLab, the feature films program has selected some filmmakers and provides them with training and development through all stages of filmmaking. The outcomes of the training and development processes are then presented during the Red Sea International Film Festival, where work was honored with a variety of cash grants.
