= Du Barry, Woman of Passion =

1930 film by Sam Taylor

- Film poster
- Directed by: Sam Taylor
- Written by: David Belasco (play); Sam Taylor (adaptation)
- Produced by: Joseph M. Schenck
- Starring: Norma Talmadge
- Cinematography: Oliver T. Marsh
- Edited by: Allen McNeil
- Distributed by: United Artists
- Release date: October 11, 1930
- Running time: 75 minutes
- Country: United States
- Language: English

Du Barry, Woman of Passion is a 1930 American pre-Code dramatic film starring Norma Talmadge, produced by her husband Joseph M. Schenck, released through United Artists, and based on a 1901 stage play Du Barry written and produced by David Belasco and starring Mrs. Leslie Carter.

This film is the second talking picture of silent star Talmadge and also her last motion picture. Prints of this film survive in the Library of Congress.

== Plot ==
In the 18th century Kingdom of France, Cosse de Brissac, a private in the King's Guard, meets Jeannette Vaubernier when she gets stuck in a pond. He frees her and is charmed by her beauty and spirit. She talks about how she dislikes working in a millinery shop, but loves beautiful things, wealth, and the prospect of being in love.

Cosse and Jeannette begin courting. However, their relationship is put in jeopardy when Jeannette is hired to be an "attraction" at the opulent gambling house that aristocrats frequent. She gains the admiration of multiple high-ranking noblemen, and King Louis XV is intrigued by her reputation. Despite Cosse disapproving of Jeannette's new employment, he proposes marriage, which she accepts.

The King meets Jeannette while he is disguised as a messenger. When she tries to leave the gambling house, she is stopped by the conniving Count Jean Du Barry, who sees her as his ticket to greater wealth and the King's court. As Jeannette fights Du Barry off, the King is excited by her fiery temperament. He removes his disguise and declares his love, offering her the position of his favorite mistress. Cosse overhears this and, mistakenly believing Jeannette has already accepted the offer, he angrily breaks off the engagement.

Jeannette becomes the King's mistress and moves into his palace. Count Du Barry claims that she now needs a title, and he offers to sell his exiled brother's title to her. She refuses but, nonetheless, Jeannette becomes known as "the Countess Du Barry." She spends money extravagantly and amasses a collection of jewels. The King knows that she is still in love with Cosse, and he insists that she forget him as he will never return to her.

Jeannette meets with the Duc de Brissac, who is both Captain of the King's Guard and Cosse's father. She asks about Cosse, and the Duc replies that he has likely died, but his whereabouts are unknown. The Duc further informs her that there is starvation in France and commoners hate Jeannette for living an aristocratic lifestyle. Finally, he claims that the last words Cosse spoke to him expressed hate towards her.

The distraught Jeannette decides to get rid of her jewels. Meanwhile, the King's advisors beg him to repeal the Pacte de Famine to curb the growing rebellion. The King refuses to do so. The Duc discovers that Cosse is alive and has become the leader of the rebellion. The King is shocked to learn this, as he imprisoned Cosse months prior.

When a mob tries to storm the palace, a wounded Cosse enters Jeannette's room and she hides him in her bed. He tells her that he became a rebel due to his false imprisonment by the jealous King. Soldiers arrive to search Jeannette's room and the Duc finds Cosse. Jeannette is horrified that the Duc would betray his own son, but he holds firm in his loyalty to "King and God."

The King holds a grand party, during which he plans to publicly execute Cosse. The King announces that the Duc killed himself shortly after handing over his son. To save Cosse's life, Jeannette declares her loyalty and love for the King. However, she cannot keep up the charade and breaks down crying. Cosse claims he will bravely face death knowing that she truly loves him. As the soldiers prepare to execute him, Jeanette opens the palace gates and lets in the angry mob. In the midst of the chaos, Cosse escapes.

During the French Revolution, Jeanette is imprisoned due to her connection to the ancien régime. She is condemned to death, but remains hopeful that Cosse will fetch her once she is pardoned. However, he is unable to overturn her sentence. He renounces his loyalty to the French Republic so they may be executed together.

== Cast ==
- Norma Talmadge - Jeannette Vaubernier, aka Madame du Barry
- William Farnum - Louis XV
- Conrad Nagel - Cosse de Brissac
- Hobart Bosworth - Duc de Brissac
- Ullrich Haupt - Jean Du Barry
- Alison Skipworth - La Gourdan
- E. Allyn Warren - Denys
- Edgar Norton - Renal
- Edwin Maxwell - Maupeou
- Henry Kolker - D'Aiguillon
- Oscar Apfel - Uncredited
- Eugenie Besserer - Rosalie the Prison Matron
- Earle Browne - Stage Director
- Knute Erickson - Jailer
- Cissy Fitzgerald - Bit role
- Clark Gable - Extra
- Lucille La Verne - Bit role
- Tom Ricketts - King's Aide
- Tom Santschi - Bit role
- Michael Visaroff - Bit

== Reception ==
The film received mixed reviews. Movie Age deemed the film tame and "only moderately entertaining." Screenland praised Talmadge as "splendid." Photoplay Magazine picked out William Farnum's role as Louis XV as one of the best performances of the year. Motion Picture News wrote that the film had done well at the box office, and Farnum's performance had been praised, despite the screenplay being considered weak.

== See also ==
- DuBarry (1915)
