= Jean du Barry =

Jean du Barry may refer to:

- Jean du Barry, seigneur de la Renaudie (died 1560), organizer of the Amboise conspiracy
- Jean-Baptiste du Barry (1723–1794), lover of Madame du Barry
