= François-Jean de Chastellux =

French writer military officer (1734–1788)

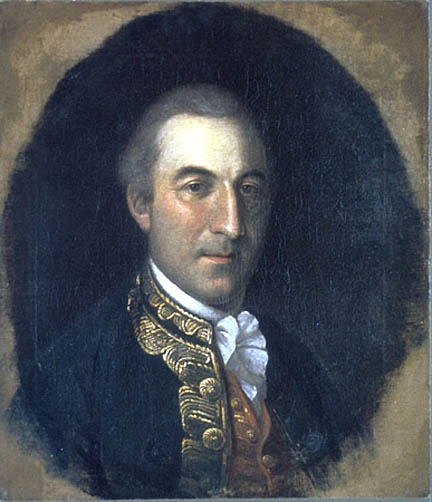
François Jean de Chastellux, portrait by Charles Willson Peale circa 1782, Independence National Historical Park, Philadelphia

François Jean de Beauvoir, Marquis de Chastellux (French: [fʁɑ̃swa ʒɑ̃ də bovwaʁ maʁki də ʃatly]; 5 May 1734, in Paris – 24 October 1788, in Paris), was a military officer who served during the War of American Independence as a major general in the French expeditionary forces led by general Comte de Rochambeau. Being on general Rochambeau's staff for the duration of the war, Chastellux acted as the principal liaison officer between the French commander in chief and George Washington.

The Chevalier de Chastellux was also widely recognized, at the time of his campaigns in America, as a highly talented man of letters and a member of the Académie française.

In commemoration of the 250th anniversary of the US Declaration of Independence, Dutch historian Iris de Rode uncovered previously his private archives containing the correspondence.

== Early literary career ==
He first became known as a writer, historian and philosopher. He was the third member elected to occupy Seat 2 of the Académie française in 1775. On his return from American, he was promoted to Field Marshall. He collaborated on the encyclopedia, and forged strong friendships with Buffon, Voltaire, Morellet, Marmontel, and frequented the literary salons of Mme Necker and Mlle de Lespinasse.

== Military career in America ==
After arriving in America in July 1780, Chastellux participated to the American Revolutionary War as Major General in the French expeditionary force led by general Rochambeau. During the following year, he was third in command of the French forces engaged at the decisive Siege of Yorktown in 1781 where the British were ultimately defeated. Major General de Chastellux was fluent in English and with his strong ideological support of the American cause, he served the alliance well. During the latter part of the campaign he was the principal liaison officer between George Washington and French general Rochambeau. Thereafter, Chastellux remained a personal friend of George Washington for life. Furthermore, the College of William and Mary and the University of Pennsylvania also awarded Chastellux with honorary degrees. After his return to France, Chastellux also remained in contact with Thomas Jefferson, now the American representative in Paris, whom he had previously visited on his Virginia estate at Monticello. He was elected both a Foreign Honorary Member of the American Academy of Arts and Sciences, and of the American Philosophical Society in 1781 (the latter honorary membership in the same year was bestowed upon Lafayette and François Barbé-Marbois, both of whom were fellow friends to the American Revolutionary cause).

== His late literary career ==
Major General de Chastellux placed on record and published in 1786 his complete recollections of the American War of Independence. This included a description of his travels in America after the war had ended. Chastellux described George Washington as an effective yet profoundly humane leader in wartime. The book was translated into English in 1796 by English lawyer and Washington supporter George Greive.

== Modern discovery ==
In commemoration of the 250th anniversary of the US Declaration of Independence, Dutch historian Iris de Rode uncovered previously his private archives containing the correspondence.

== Bibliography ==
- Essai sur l'union de la poésie et de la musique (1765). Réédition : Slatkine, Genève, 1970.
- De la Félicité publique, ou Considérations sur le sort des hommes, dans les différentes époques de l'histoire (1772). Réédition : Publications de la Sorbonne, Paris, 1989.
- Iphigénie en Aulide, opéra (1773)
- Éloge de M. Helvétius (1774)
- Voyages de M. le Marquis de Chastellux dans l'Amérique septentrionale, dans les années 1780, 1781 et 1782 in two volumes, chez Prault, Imprimeur du Roi (1788). Modern réédition : Tallandier, Paris, 1989. An English translation by Howard C.Rice was published in 1963 under the title:" Travels in North America in 1780,1781 and 1782"
- "Chevalier de Chastellux at the Battle of Yorktown" in: "Yorktown Battlefield-Chevalier de Chastellux" (U.S.National Park Service)
- Travels in North America in the Years 1780-81-82 Marquis de Chastellux. BiblioBazaar LLC, Charleston, SC 2009
- Iris de Rode, François-Jean de Chastellux (1734–1788). Un soldat-philosophe dans le monde atlantique à l'époque des Lumières. Paris, H. Champion, 2022.
