= George Grieve =

George Grieve (1748–1809), or Greive (as he latterly spelled it), was an English lawyer who was best known as the persecutor of Madame Du Barry during the French Revolution.

== Early life in England ==
Grieve was the son of Richard Grieve, an attorney, of Alnwick, and Elizabeth Davidson.

His father Richard was the under-sheriff of Northumberland. George's grandfather, Ralph, a merchant, had been prominent at Alnwick in political contests, and George's elder brother, Davidson Richard, was high sheriff of Northumberland in 1788. Grieve, on coming of age, had to go to law with the town corporation to take up his freedom, their plea being that his father, who had died in 1765 at the age of eighty-four, had been temporarily disfranchised at the time of George's birth.

During the 1770s, he organised the Constitutional Club of Durham, Northumberland and Newcastle; the club supported parliamentary reform in England and America.

In 1774, he took an active part in defeating the Duke of Northumberland's attempt to nominate both of the members for the county. When the local Member of Parliament, Walter Blackett, died in 1777, Grieve supported Andrew Robinson Bowes as parliamentary candidate. In 1778 he headed a mob in levelling the fences of a portion of the moor which the town corporation had presented to the duke's agent.

== Move to the USA ==
In 1781 he emigrated to America, where he aligned with Washington and other founders of the republic. He is said to have been sent on a mission to Holland, and about 1783 he took up his abode at Paris. He probably represented America in revolutionary demonstrations.

== Madame Du Barry ==
In the winter of 1792, during Madame Du Barry's visit to London in search of her stolen diamonds, he took lodgings at an inn at Louveciennes, won over two of her servants to the side of the revolution. In particular, he worked with her servant Louis-Benoit Zamor, whose information was used during her trial. Grieve also held a club in Du Barry's house, and procured an order for seals to be placed on her papers and valuables.

On her return in March 1793 he drew up a list of ‘suspects’ for arrest, her name being the first, and on 1 July he escorted the municipality to the bar of the convention, where authority to apprehend her was obtained. A petition from the villagers having effected her release, he published on 31 July a virulent pamphlet entitled ‘L'égalité controuvée ou petite histoire … de la Du Barry.’ He signed himself ‘Greive, défendeur officieux des braves sans-culottes de Louveciennes, ami de Franklin et de Marat, factieux et anarchiste de premier ordre, et désorganisateur du despotisme dans les deux hémisphères depuis vingt ans.’

On 22 September he obtained a fresh order for her arrest, and escorted her part of the way to Paris in the carriage, but a petition again secured her release. On 19 Nov. she was once more apprehended. Grieve, who had wormed her secrets out of her two faithless servants, superintended the search for her jewels, concealed in dungheaps; he got up the case against her, and was himself one of the witnesses. He may have been urged on by Marat, who had invited him to dinner the very day of his assassination, but he was apparently infected with the mania of delation, for he denounced the Jacobin ex-priest Roux as Charlotte Corday's accomplice, on the ground of having seen him ‘look furious’ when calling on Marat. This denunciation, however, had no effect.

On Robespierre's fall Grieve was arrested at Amiens, and was taken to Versailles, where twenty-two depositions were taken against him, but the prosecution was dropped. Returning to America, he resided at Alexandria, Virginia, and published in 1796 a translation of Travels in North-America, in the years 1780-81-82 by François-Jean de Chastellux.

== Later life ==
He eventually settled at Brussels, where he died 22 February 1809, the register describing him as a native of ‘Newcastel, Amérique.’ He appears to have been unmarried, and to have broken off all intercourse with his kindred. Vatel, who had examined some of his manuscripts in the National Archives, Paris, testifies to his thorough mastery of French, and his pamphlet, the copy of which in the French National Library contains autograph corrections, bespeaks a familiarity with the classics.
