= Madame du Barry =

Mistress of Louis XV, executed during the Reign of Terror (1743–1793)

Jeanne Bécu
- Comtesse du Barry
- Portrait by Élisabeth Vigée Le Brun, 1782
- Born: Jeanne Bécu; 19 August 1743; Vaucouleurs, Kingdom of France
- Died: 8 December 1793 (aged 50); Paris, French First Republic
- Buried: Madeleine Cemetery
- Spouse: Comte Guillaume du Barry (m. 1768)
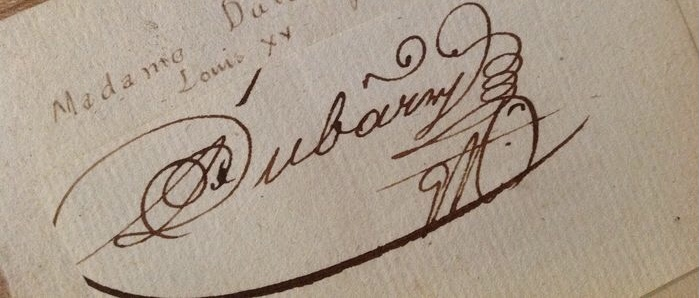
- Signature

Jeanne Bécu, Comtesse du Barry (French: [baʁi]; 19 August 1743 – 8 December 1793) was the last maîtresse-en-titre of King Louis XV of France. She was executed by guillotine during the French Revolution on accusations of treason—particularly being suspected of assisting émigrés to flee from the Revolution. She is also known as "Mademoiselle Vaubernier" ([vobɛʁnje]).

In 1768, when the king wished to make Jeanne maîtresse-en-titre, etiquette required her to be the wife of a high courtier, so she was hastily married on 1 September 1768 to Comte Guillaume du Barry. The wedding ceremony was accompanied by a false birth certificate created by Jean-Baptiste du Barry, the comte's older brother. The certificate made Jeanne appear younger by three years and obscured her poor background. Henceforth, she was recognised as the king's official paramour.

Her arrival at the French royal court scandalised some, because she had been a courtesan and came from humble beginnings. She was shunned by many, including Marie Antoinette, whose contempt for Jeanne caused alarm and dissension at court. On New Year's Day 1772, Marie Antoinette deigned to speak to Jeanne; her remark, "There are many people at Versailles today", was enough to take the edge off the dispute, though many still disapproved of Jeanne.

Decades later, during the Reign of Terror in the French Revolution, Jeanne was imprisoned over accusations of treason by her servant Zamor. She was executed by guillotine on 8 December 1793. Her body was buried in the Madeleine Cemetery. The fabulous gems which she had smuggled to London were sold at auction in 1795.

== Early years ==
Marie-Jeanne Bécu was the illegitimate daughter of Anne Bécu, a 30-year-old seamstress. Jeanne's father remains unidentified; however, it is possible that her father was Jean Jacques Gomard, a friar known as frère Ange. One of her mother's acquaintances and presumed brief lover Monsieur Billiard-Dumonceaux took 3-year-old Jeanne and her mother into his care when they traveled from Vaucouleurs to Paris. There, Anne worked as cook to Dumonceaux's mistress Francesca, who pampered Jeanne. Her education began at the Convent of St Aure, in the outskirts of Paris.

When she came of age at fifteen, Jeanne left the convent. Around that time, she and her mother Anne were evicted from Monsieur Dumonceaux's household and returned to Anne's husband Nicolas Rançon. Needing an income, Jeanne first hawked trinkets for sale on the streets of Paris. In 1758 she found a job assisting a young hairdresser named Lametz. She was soon employed as a reader and companion (dame de compagnie) to an elderly widow, Madame de la Garde, but was sent away when she drew the attentions of la Garde's two married sons and one of their wives. From 1763 Jeanne worked as a milliner's assistant and grisette in the fashionable haberdashery shop called "La Toilette" of Madame Labille and her husband. Labille's daughter, Adélaïde Labille-Guiard, became a good friend of Jeanne.

As painted at the time, Jeanne was a beautiful blonde with thick ringlets and almond-shaped blue eyes. In 1763, when she was visiting the brothel-casino of Madame Quisnoy, her beauty attracted the notice of the owner, Jean-Baptiste du Barry. He installed Jeanne in his household as his mistress, calling her Mademoiselle Lange. From 1766 du Barry helped establish Jeanne's career as a courtesan in the highest circles of Parisian society, including the aristocracy.

== Mistress of Louis XV: 1768–1774 ==
Portrait of Jeanne Bécu, by François-Hubert Drouais in 1770: Museo del Prado

Jeanne quickly became a sensation in Paris, building up a large aristocratic clientele. She had many customers, including government ministers and royal courtiers, the most prominent being the Maréchal de Richelieu. Though the Duc de Choiseul found her rather ordinary, in 1768 he took her to Versailles, where King Louis XV caught sight of her. The king took a great interest and sent for her through his valet and procurer Dominique Lebel. The popular Queen Marie Leszczyńska was dying, and Jeanne was escorted to the king's boudoir so frequently as to cause Lebel concern for his position. After weeks of sincerely mourning the queen's death in June 1768, Louis XV was ready to resume his affairs. As a woman of low birth as well as a prostitute, Jeanne could not qualify as maîtresse-en-titre, but the king ordered she be married to a man of good lineage and brought to court. On 1 September 1768 she was married to Count Guillaume du Barry, the younger brother of her former lover Jean-Baptiste du Barry. The marriage ceremony included a false birth certificate created by Jean-Baptiste du Barry, making Jeanne appear younger by three years and of fictitious noble descent.

Jeanne was installed above the king's quarters in Lebel's former rooms. She lived a lonely life, unable to be seen with the king since no formal presentation had taken place. Very few, if any, of the nobility deigned to acknowledge her, a woman of the street who presumed above her station. Jeanne had to be presented at court, but Louis XV required her to find a proper sponsor. For this, the Duke of Richelieu eventually found Madame de Béarn, who was bribed by the settlement of her huge gambling debts.

On the first attempt at the presentation, Madame de Béarn panicked and feigned a sprained ankle. The second occasion was cancelled when the king fell off his horse while hunting and broke his arm. Finally, Jeanne was presented at court on 22 April 1769, amid a cacophony of gossip among the crowds outside the palace and the courtiers in the Hall of Mirrors. She wore a silvery white gown brocaded with gold, bedecked in jewels sent by the king the night before, and with huge side panniers, whose like had never been seen. Her spectacular coiffure was worked up even as she kept the court waiting.

Jeanne first befriended her husband's sister, a cultured spinster, Claire Françoise du Barry, who was brought from Languedoc to instruct her in etiquette. Later on, she also befriended the Maréchale de Mirepoix, and other noblewomen were bribed into her entourage. Jeanne quickly accustomed herself to living in luxury. Louis XV gave her a young Bengali slave named Zamor, whom she dressed in elegant clothing. Jeanne developed a liking for Zamor and began to educate him. In his trial testimony in 1793, Zamor gave Chittagong as his birthplace; he was probably of Siddi origin. According to Stanley Loomis' biography Du Barry, Jeanne's everyday routine began at 9.00 am, when Zamor would bring her a morning cup of chocolate. She would select a gown and jewellery and be dressed; then her hairdresser Berline (or Nokelle for special occasions) would come to do her powder and curls. She would then receive friends, as well as tradesmen such as dressmakers, jewellers, and artists offering her their finest stock.

She was extravagant but soft-hearted. When the old Comte and Comtesse de Lousene were forcibly evicted from their château for heavy debts, they were sentenced to death because the comtesse had shot and killed a bailiff and police officer while resisting. When Madame de Béarn told Jeanne of their situation, she begged the king to pardon them, refusing to rise from her knees until he agreed. Louis XV was moved: "Madame, I am delighted that the first favour you should ask of me should be an act of mercy!" Jeanne was visited by a Monsieur Mandeville who asked a pardon for a young girl condemned to the gallows for infanticide after concealing the birth of a stillborn child. Jeanne's letter to the Chancellor of France saved the girl.

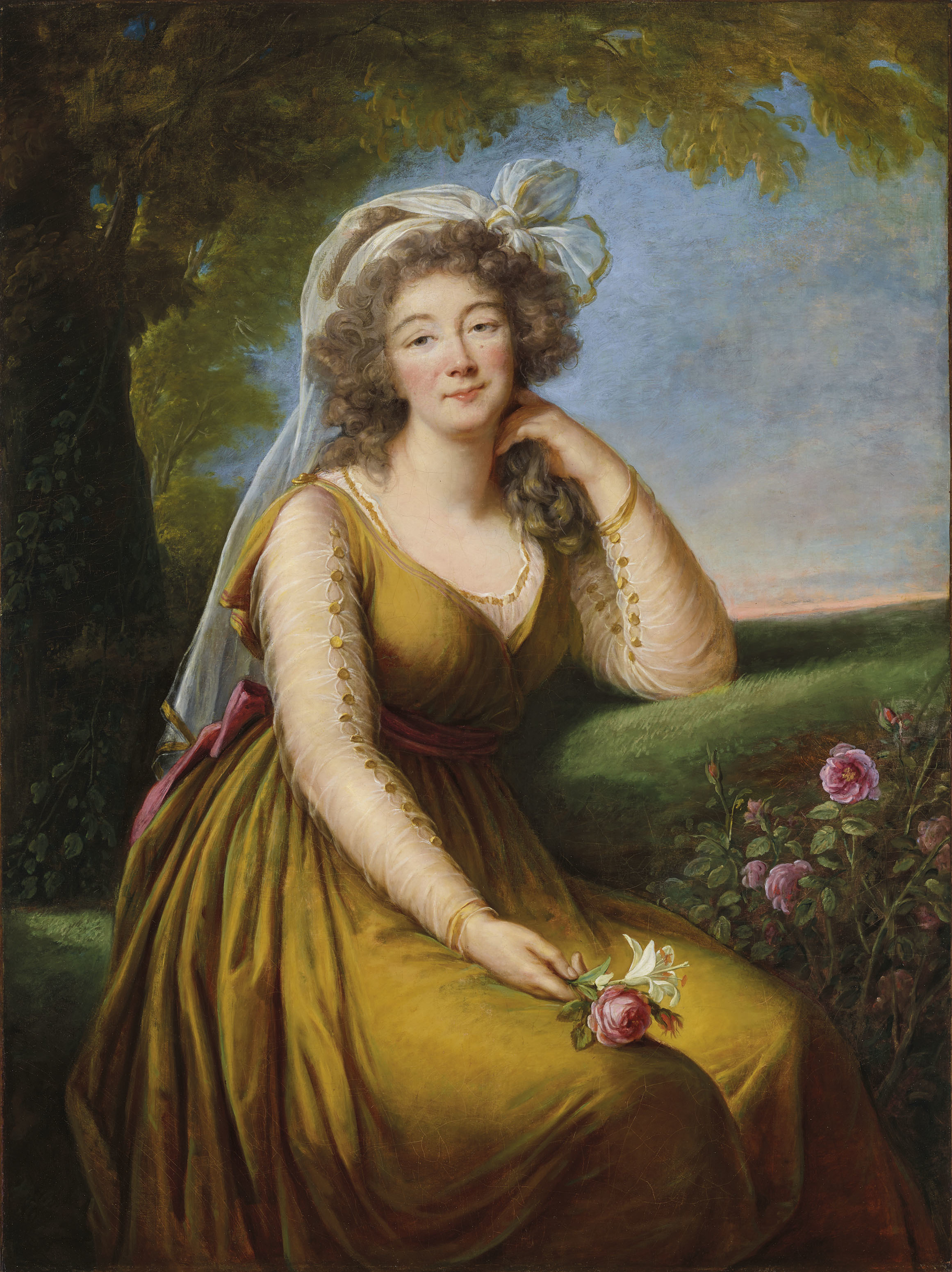
Madame du Barry, by Élisabeth Vigée Le Brun; posthumous, between 1789 and 1805. Vigée Le Brun began working on the portrait in 1789, but had to abandon it when she underwent exile the same year, due to the French Revolution. Eventually, the portrait was given back to Vigée Le Brun, who completed it and gifted it to her niece.

As the king's maîtresse déclarée, Jeanne was the centre of all eyes at court. She wore costly, extravagant gowns, and diamonds covered her neck and ears, putting further strain on the treasury. She made both friends and enemies. Her most bitter rival was Béatrix, Duchesse de Gramont, who had in vain tried her best to acquire the place of the king's previous mistress, the late Marquise de Pompadour. Since the beginning, Béatrix had plotted with her brother for Jeanne's removal, even writing libelous pamphlets against her as well as the king.

In time Jeanne became acquainted with the Duc d'Aiguillon, who sided with her against the Duc de Choiseul. As Jeanne's power in court grew stronger, Choiseul began feeling his was waning. Though the king believed his country exhausted after the Seven Years' War, Choiseul decided that France was capable of war again and supported Spain against Britain in their struggle for possession of the Falkland Islands. Du Barry exposed his plot to the king on Christmas Eve 1770, and Choiseul was dismissed from his ministry and exiled from court.

Despite this intrigue, Jeanne, unlike her predecessor Madame de Pompadour, had little interest in politics, reserving her passion for new gowns and jewellery. However, the king went so far as to let her participate in state councils. An anecdote recounts that the king said to the Duc de Noailles that Madame du Barry introduced him to new pleasures; "Sire" – answered the duke – "that's because your Majesty has never been in a brothel." While Jeanne was known for her good nature and support of artists, she grew increasingly unpopular because of the king's extravagant spending on her. She was forever in debt despite her huge monthly income—at one point up to 3,000 livres. She retained her position until the death of Louis XV, despite the attempt to depose her by the Duc de Choiseul and the Duc d'Aiguillon, who tried to arrange a secret marriage between the king and Madame Pater.

=== Diamond necklace affair ===
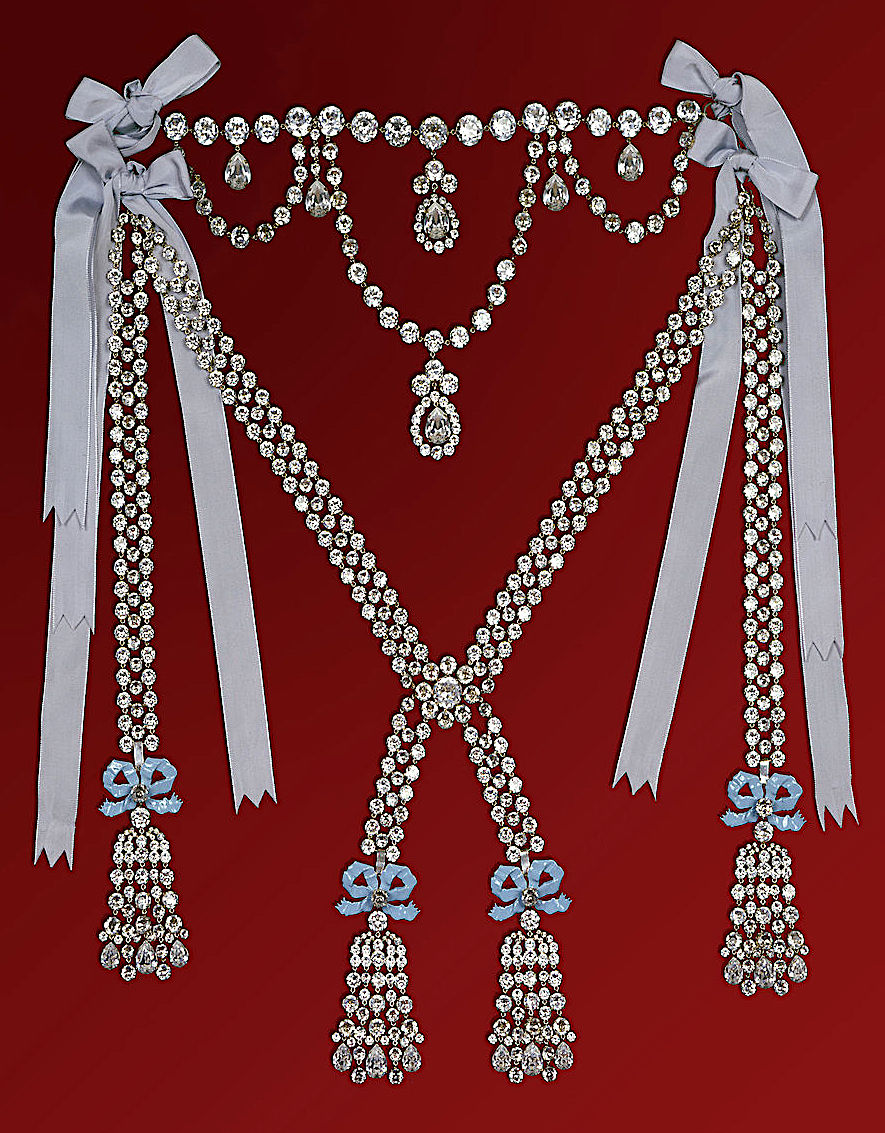
The diamond necklace commissioned by King Louis XV for Madame du Barry (reproduction)

In 1772, the infatuated Louis XV requested that Parisian jewellers Boehmer and Bassenge create a necklace for Jeanne of unprecedented extravagance, at an estimated cost of two million livres. The necklace, still unfinished and unpaid when Louis XV died, would eventually trigger a scandal involving Jeanne de la Motte-Valois, in which Queen Marie Antoinette was accused of bribing Cardinal de Rohan to purchase it for her, accusations which would figure prominently in the onset of the French Revolution.

== Exile: 1774–1792 ==
In time, King Louis XV started to think of death and repentance and began missing appointments in Jeanne's boudoir. During a stay at the Petit Trianon with her, Louis felt the first symptoms of smallpox. He was brought back to the palace at night and put to bed, where his daughters and Jeanne stayed beside him. On 4 May 1774 the king suggested to Madame du Barry that she leave Versailles, both to protect her from infection and so that he could prepare for confession and last rites. She retired to the Duc d'Aiguillon's estate near Rueil. Following the death of the king and his grandson's ascension to the throne as Louis XVI, Queen Marie Antoinette had Jeanne exiled to the Abbey du Pont-aux-Dames near Meaux-en-Brie. At first she was met coldly by the nuns, but soon enough they softened to her timid ways and opened up to her, most of all the abbess Madame de la Roche-Fontenelle.

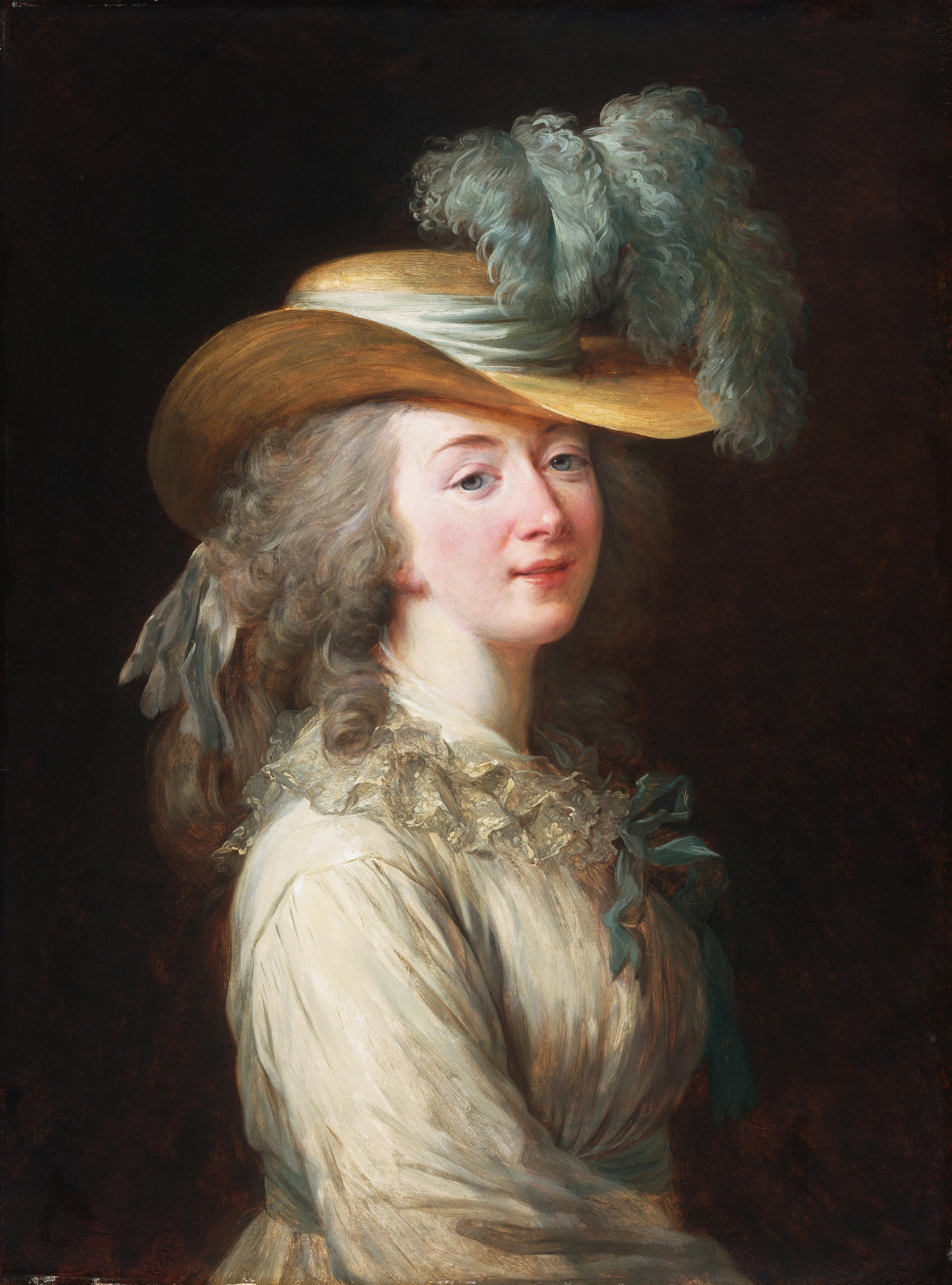
Portrait of Madame du Barry, by Élisabeth Vigée Le Brun in 1781

After a year at the convent, Jeanne was granted permission to visit the surrounding countryside provided she return by sundown. A month later, she was allowed out farther, but not to venture within 10 miles (16 km) of Versailles, including to her beloved Château de Louveciennes. Two years later, she was allowed to move to Louveciennes.

In the following years, she had a liaison with Louis Hercule Timoléon de Cossé-Brissac. She later also fell in love with Henry Seymour of Redland, whom she met when he moved with his family to the neighbourhood of the château. In time, Seymour became fed up with his secret love affair and sent a painting to Jeanne with the words 'leave me alone' written in English at the bottom, which the painter Lemoyne copied in 1796. The Duc de Brissac proved the more faithful in this ménage-à-trois, having kept Jeanne in his heart despite Seymour.

During the French Revolution, Brissac was captured while visiting Paris and lynched by the mob. Late that night, Jeanne heard a drunken crowd approaching the château, and through the opened window where she looked, came a blood-stained cloth with Brissac's head, after which, she fainted.

== Imprisonment, trial and execution: 1792–93 ==
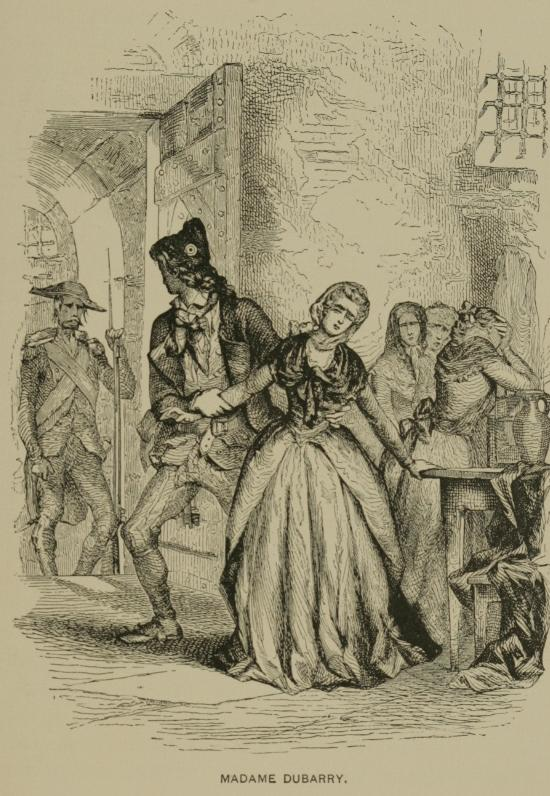
Madame du Barry being taken away to the scaffold, by Tighe Hopkins: The Dungeons of Old Paris, 1897

Jeanne's slave Zamor, along with another member of du Barry's domestic staff, had joined the Jacobin club. He became a follower of the revolutionary George Grieve and then an office-bearer in the Committee of Public Safety. Jeanne found out about this in 1792 and questioned Zamor about his connections with Grieve. Upon realising the depth of his involvement, she gave him three days' notice to quit her service. Zamor promptly denounced his mistress to the committee.

Based largely on Zamor's testimony, Madame du Barry was suspected of financially assisting émigrés who had fled the revolution, and she was arrested in 1793. When the Revolutionary Tribunal of Paris accused her of treason and condemned her to death, she vainly attempted to save herself by revealing the location of the gemstones she had hidden.

On 8 December 1793 Madame du Barry was beheaded by the guillotine on the Place de la Révolution. On the way to the guillotine, she collapsed in the tumbrel and cried, "You are going to hurt me! Why?!" Terrified, she screamed for mercy and begged the watching crowd for help. Her last words to the executioner are said to have been: "De grâce, monsieur le bourreau, encore un petit moment!" (transl. "One more moment, Mr. Executioner, I beg you!") She was buried in the Madeleine Cemetery with multiple other victims, including Louis XVI and Marie Antoinette.

Although her French estate went to the Tribunal de Paris, the jewels she had smuggled out of France to England were sold at an auction at Christie's in London in 1795. Colonel Johann Keglevich took part in the Battle of Mainz with Hessian mercenaries paid by the British with money from this sale.

== Relationship with Marie Antoinette ==
Jeanne's relationship with Marie Antoinette was contentious. They first met at a family supper at the Château de la Muette on 15 May 1770—the day before Marie Antoinette's wedding with the Dauphin Louis-Auguste. Jeanne had been the king's mistress for little over a year, and many thought she would not be included at the occasion. It ended up being otherwise, to the disgust of most of those present. Marie Antoinette noticed Jeanne, who stood out from the crowd with her extravagant appearance and a high voice. The Comtesse de Noailles informed Marie Antoinette that Jeanne pleased the king, and the 14-year-old archduchess innocently said that she would rival her. The Comte de Provence soon disillusioned the new princess, who was outraged at such open immorality. Their rivalry continued, especially since the Dauphin supported Choiseul in favour of the alliance with Austria.

Marie Antoinette defied court protocol by refusing to speak to Madame du Barry. She not only disapproved of Jeanne's background, but felt insulted when she heard from the Comte de Provence of Jeanne's laughter at a salacious story told by the Cardinal de Rohan about Marie Antoinette's mother, Empress Maria Theresa. Jeanne furiously complained to the king, who then complained to the Austrian ambassador Mercy, who in turn did his best to appease Marie Antoinette. Eventually, during a ball on New Year's Day 1772, Marie Antoinette spoke indirectly to Jeanne, casually observing; "There are many people at Versailles today", giving her the option to respond or not.

== In popular culture ==
=== Food ===
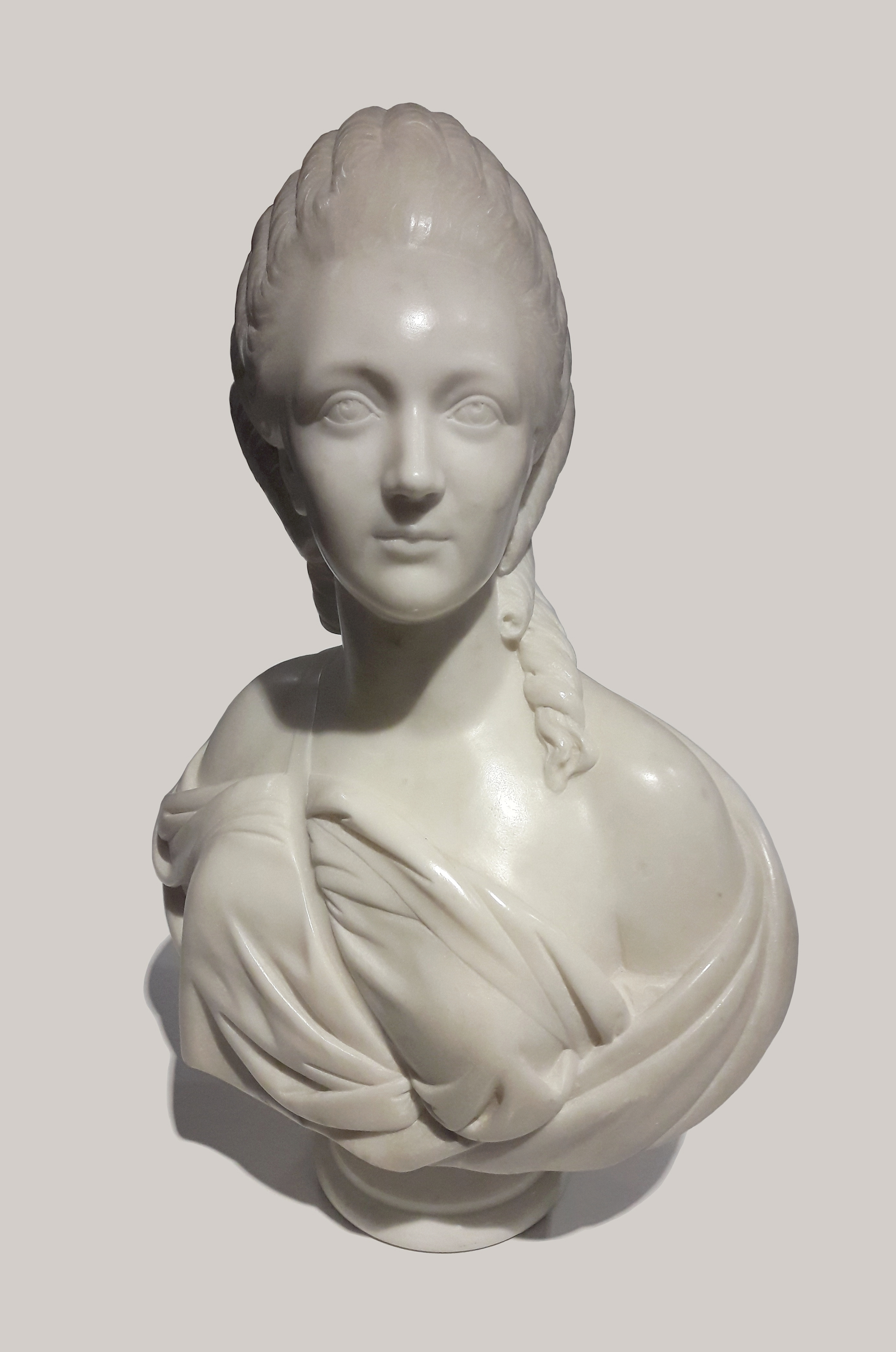
Marble bust of Madame du Barry, by Augustin Pajou in 1773: National Museum, Warsaw

Many dishes, such as soup du Barry, are named after Jeanne. A common component of dishes bearing the name "du Barry" is a creamy white sauce. Many have cauliflower, perhaps an allusion to her powdered hair with curls piled like cauliflower florets.

=== Film ===
Madame du Barry was portrayed in film by:

- Mrs. Leslie Carter in the 1915 film DuBarry, directed by Edoardo Bencivenga
- Theda Bara in the 1917 film Madame Du Barry, directed by J. Gordon Edwards
- Pola Negri in the 1919 film Madame Dubarry, directed by Ernst Lubitsch
- Norma Talmadge in the 1930 film Du Barry, Woman of Passion
- Dolores del Río in the 1934 film Madame Du Barry, directed by William Dieterle
- Gladys George in the 1938 MGM film Marie Antoinette, which stars Norma Shearer in the title role
- Lucille Ball in the 1943 movie version of DuBarry Was a Lady
- Margot Grahame in the 1949 film Black Magic, also starring Orson Welles in the lead role of Count Cagliostro
- Martine Carol in the 1954 film Madame du Barry, directed by Christian-Jaque
- Asia Argento in the 2006 film Marie Antoinette, directed by Sofia Coppola
- Maïwenn in the 2023 film Jeanne du Barry, also starring Johnny Depp as Louis XV, directed by Maïwenn

=== Literature ===
- In The Idiot by Fyodor Dostoyevsky, the character Lebedev tells the story of du Barry's life and execution and prays for her soul.
- Du Barry is one of the central characters in Sally Christie's The Enemies of Versailles (2017).

=== Television ===
- Du Barry is portrayed by French actress Gaia Weiss in the BBC/CANAL+ 8-part television series Marie Antoinette. Her relationship with Marie Antoinette is a core theme of the first four episodes.
- Du Barry is one of Marie Antoinette's antagonists in the shōjo manga and anime series The Rose of Versailles.

=== Opera ===
- Gräfin Dubarry is an operetta in three acts by Carl Millöcker to a German libretto by F. Zell and Richard Genée.
- La Du Barry is an opera (1912) in three acts by Giannino Antona Traversi and Ernrico Golisciani, with music by Ezio Camussi.
