= Iris de Rode =

Dutch historian, specialised in the French aid in the US War of Independence

Iris de Rode (born in the Netherlands) is a Dutch historian, specialised in the French aid in the US War of Independence. She won the Prix Guizot . She studied at University of Paris 8, and taught at Sciences Po in Paris, from 2013 to 2022.

She was a fellow at the University of Virginia, Mount Vernon, and the American Philosophical Society.

== Discovery ==
In commemoration of the 250th anniversary of the US Declaration of Independence, Iris de Rode uncovered previously private archives containing the correspondence of a pivotal figure in the US War of Independence: the Marquis de Chastellux.

== Works ==
- Rode, Iris de (2022). François-Jean de Chastellux (1734-1788) (in French). Paris: Honoré Champion éditeur. ISBN 978-2-7453-5684-0.
- de Rode, Iris (2024). "Finding the American Revolution in France: François-Jean de Chastellux's Private Papers and Beyond". Early American Studies. 22 (1): 156–193. doi:10.1353/eam.2024.a920463. ISSN 1559-0895.
- Lender, Mark; De Rode, Iris (2025-05-30). "The New Jersey Connection: Joseph Bloomfield and Lafayette's American Farewell Tour, An Overlooked Lafayette Letter". New Jersey Studies. 11 (1): 9–21. doi:10.14713/njs.v11i1.376. ISSN 2374-0647.
- Rode, Iris de (2023-06-30). "Forging the French-American Alliance in Newport". Newport History: Journal of the Newport Historical Society. 98 (287).
