= Zamor =

Bangladeshi born slave and revolutionary (1762–1820)

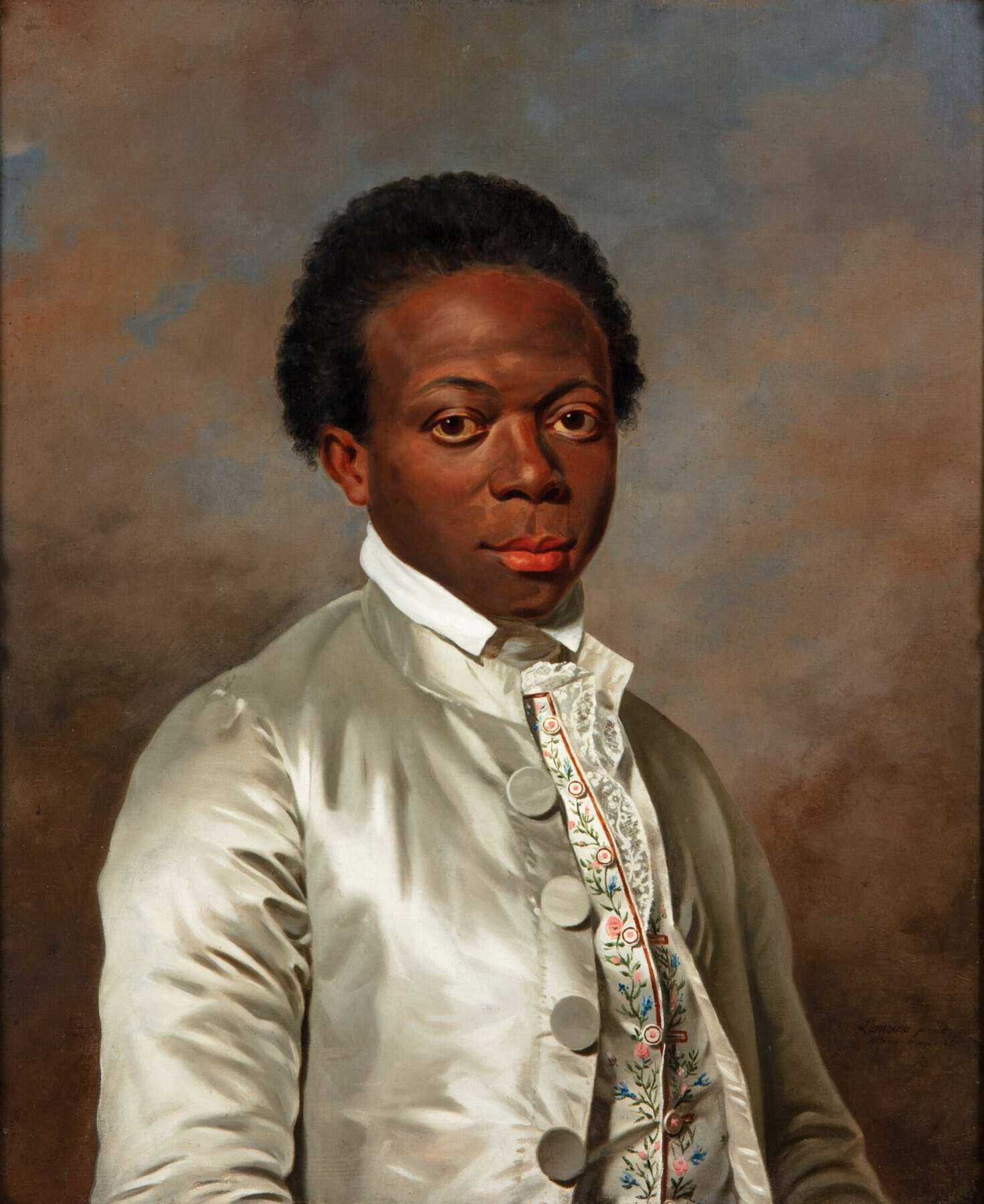
- Possible portrait by Marie-Victoire Lemoine, 1785
- Born: c. 1762; Chittagong, Bengal Subah, British East India Company
- Died: 7 February 1820 (aged 57–58); Paris, France

Signature
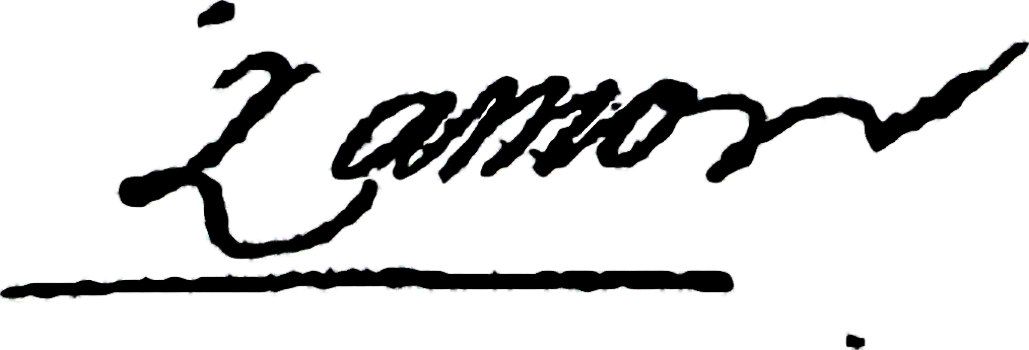

Louis-Benoît Zamor (c. 1762 – 7 February 1820) was a Bengali-born slave and revolutionary who spent most of his life in France. Born in Chittagong, Bengal in c. 1762, he was captured and sold into slavery and brought to France, possibly by a British sea captain. He became a servant of Madame du Barry, though after the French Revolution began in 1789, Zamor became a fervent supporter of the revolution and supplied information which led to du Barry's execution in 1793. Zamor disappears from historical records until 1815, when he was recorded as working as a teacher in Paris until his death in 1820.

== Early life ==
Zamor was born in Chittagong, Bengal in c. 1762, and was possibly of Siddi descent. He was captured and sold into slavery; Chittagong was a major depot for the Indian Ocean slave trade at the time. Following his enslavement, he was brought to France, possibly by a British sea captain, at an unknown date. He soon came into the possession of Louis XV, having possibly been bought by Louis François, Prince of Conti or Louis François Armand de Vignerot du Plessis, 3rd Duke of Richelieu and gifted to the king.

== Royal servant ==
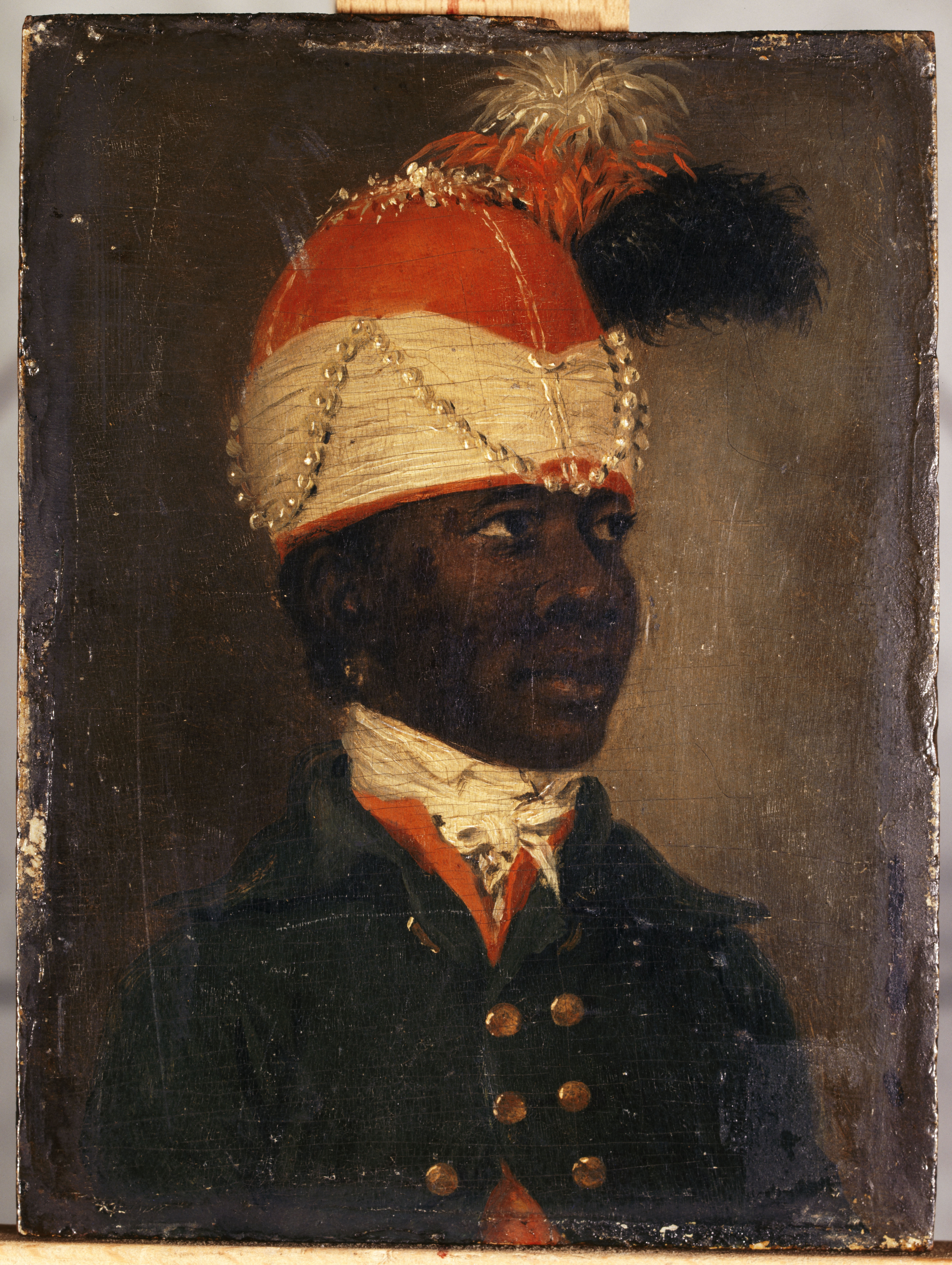
Alleged portrait of Zamor by a member of the Van Loo family

Louis XV subsequently gave Zamor to his mistress, Madame du Barry, who christened him as "Louis-Benoît Zamor" at the Church of Notre-Dame, Versailles and arranged for him to be educated. Du Barry "treated Zamor as some kind of curiosity and marvelled at his intelligence, insolence and independence", writing in her memoirs:

The second object of my regard was Zamor, a young African boy, full of intelligence and mischief; simple and independent in his nature, yet wild as his country. Zamor fancied himself the equal of all he met, scarcely deigning to acknowledge the king himself as his superior.

Zamor lived at the Palace of Versailles, continuing to do so after Louis XV died in 1774 and Marie Antoinette sent du Barry into exile near Meaux. In 1776, du Barry reunited with Zamor and they moved into the Château de Madame du Barry; a 1771 painting commemorating the inauguration of the château's "Pavillon de Musique" featured a supposed likeness of Zamor.

== French Revolution and death ==
In 1789, the French Revolution began, when Zamor was approximately 27 years old. He became a fervent supporter of the revolution, joining the Jacobins and becoming a follower of George Grieve, an English revolutionary in France. Zamor also became an office holder in the Committee of Public Safety, and supplied information which led to du Barry's arrest in 1792. Upon her release, du Barry discovered Zamor's betrayal and dismissed him from her household within three days. An outraged Zamor brought further charges against her before the committee, which led to du Barry's execution by guillotine on 8 December 1793. Zamor was arrested in the same month by the Girondins due to being a Jacobin but was released six weeks later due to a lack of evidence.

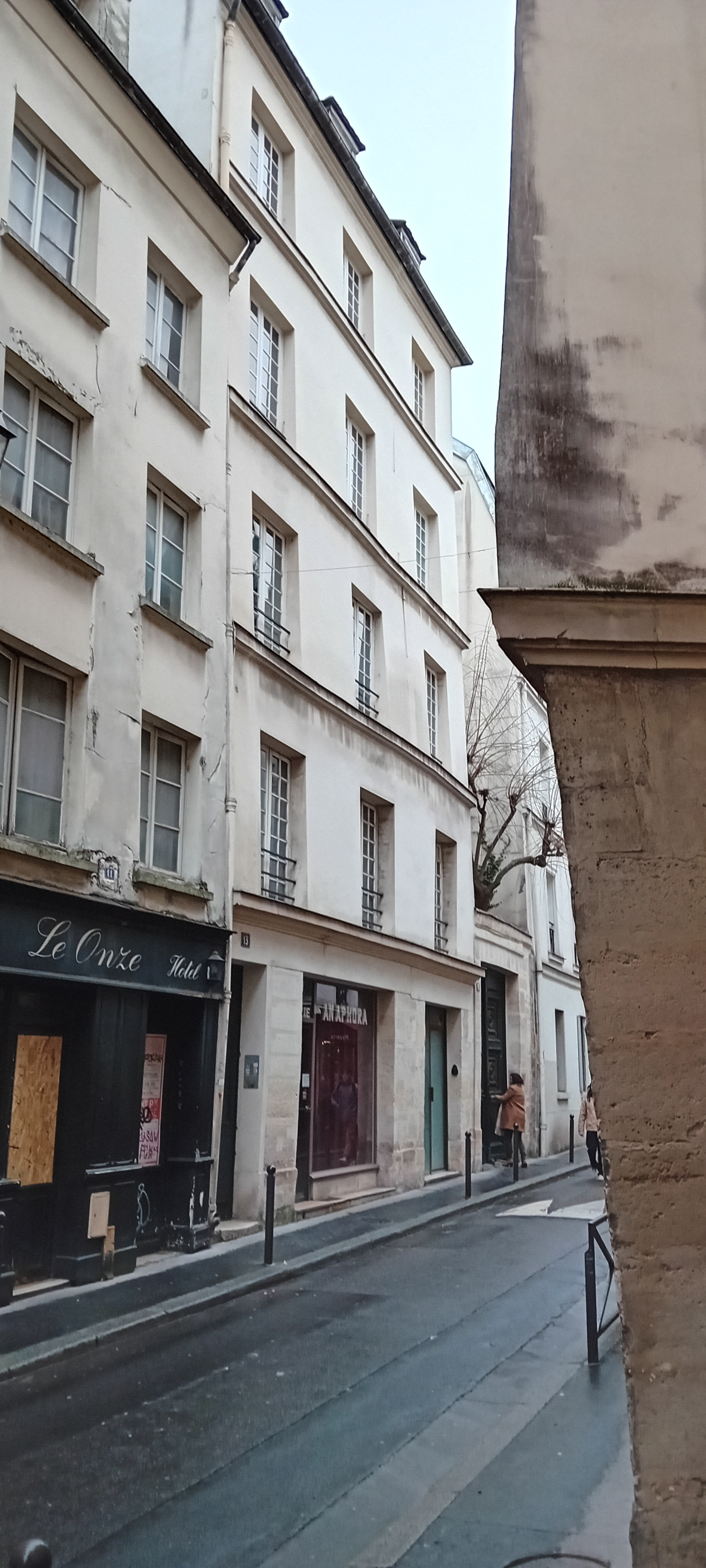
Zamor's final residence in 13, rue Maître-Albert

Zamor disappears from historical records between 1794 and 1815, when he surfaced as a teacher in Paris who lived in the 5th arrondissement near the Latin Quarter. He was said to be disliked by his students due to his harsh teaching methods. Zamor died on 7 February 1820, with his funeral having no attendees. Details of Zamor's life, including his race and physical appearance, have been contested as alleged depictions of him have had their authenticity challenged. Cecile Bishop, a biographer of Zamor, stated:

He appears in a wide range of written and visual sources, from the eighteenth century to the present, including pamphlets, novels, paintings, and even films such as Ernst Lubitsch's 1919 silent feature Madame Dubarry and Sofia Coppola's 2006 Marie Antoinette. Yet his character remains unsubstantial and elusive...

In the years following Zamor's death, Black servants in Europe who were perceived to be deceitful or lascivious were often referred to as "Zamor". The historian Lise Schreier wrote that "Between 1815 and 1914... Zamore was consistently presented as a repugnant, treacherous character... Even more perplexing, given his status as a dark-skinned commodified child, his ubiquitous shadow neither generated nor organized any type of discourse on slavery, childhood, or abuse. Zamore, who had hardly ever been considered fully human while he was alive, did not become a fully formulated thought after his death, either."
