= Mohammed Al Turki =

Saudi film producer

Mohammed Al Turki (Note: Also spelled as Mohammed Al-Turki according to Arab News.) is a Saudi Arabian film producer.

== Filmography ==
Year	Film	Notes
2010	The Imperialists Are Still Alive!	Executive producer
2012	Arbitrage	Executive producer
2012	At Any Price	Executive producer
2012	What Maisie Knew	Co-producer
2013	Adult World	Executive producer
2013	Innocence	Co-executive producer
2014	Desert Dancer	Executive producer
2014	99 Homes	Executive producer
2014	Time Out of Mind	Executive producer
2017	Metamorphosis: Junior Year	Executive producer
2021	Crisis	Executive producer
2023	Ferrari	Executive producer
TBA	Modi	Executive producer
