= Jean-Baptiste du Barry =

French nobleman (1723–1794)

Jean-Baptiste DuBarry, comte du Barry-Cérès, vidame de Châlons en Champagne (1723 – 17 January 1794) was a French nobleman. He is most notable as the lover and pimp of Jeanne Bécu (later better known as Madame du Barry, Louis XV's last official mistress), later becoming her brother-in-law by arranging a marriage-of-convenience between her and his younger brother Guillaume Dubarry at the église Saint-Laurent de Paris on 1 September 1768. Through that union the two brothers benefitted from royal largesse.

== Life ==
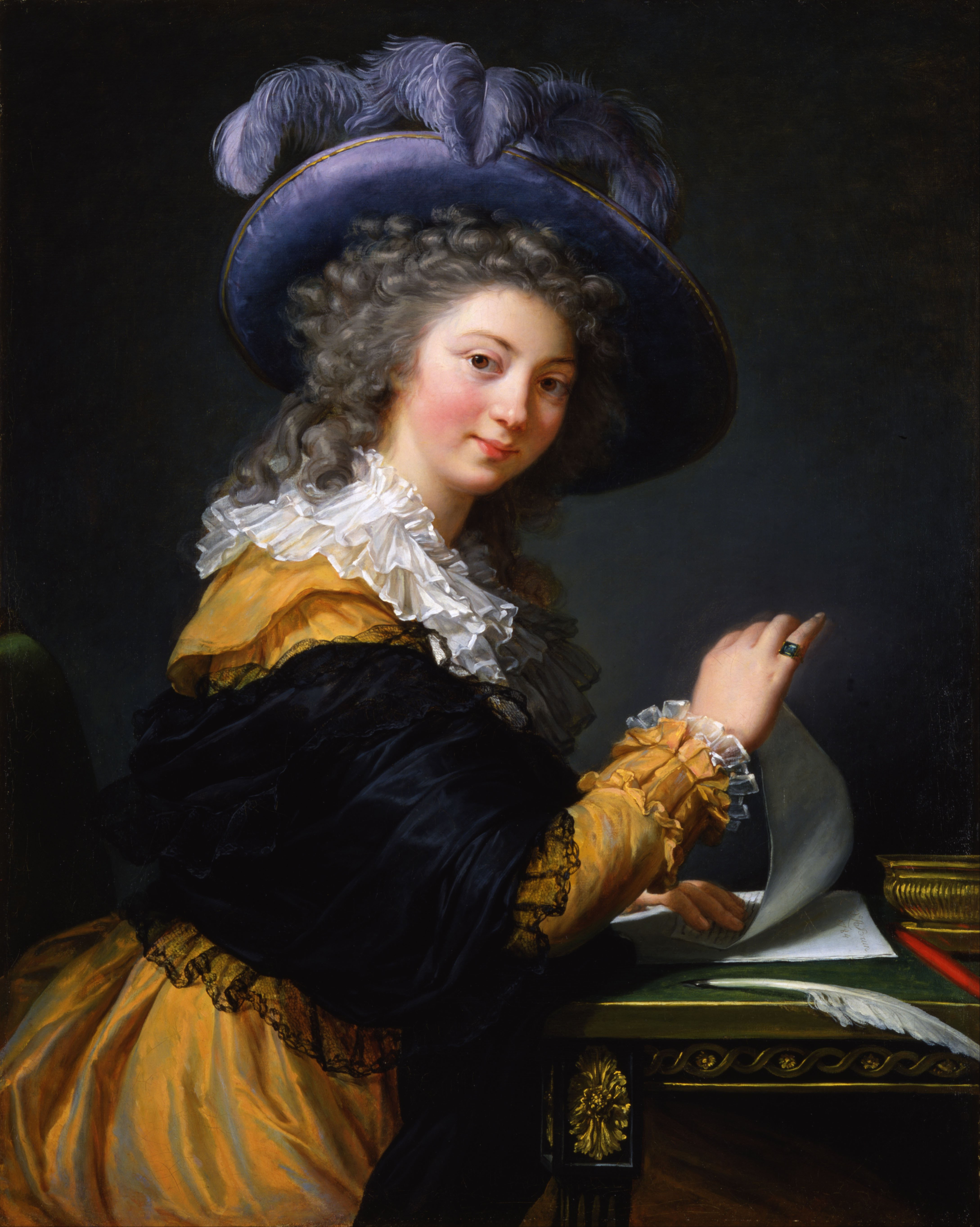
Portrait of the comtesse de Cérès, by Élisabeth Vigée Le Brun, 1784, Toledo Art Museum.

Born in Lévignac, Haute-Garonne, Jean-Baptiste was the son of Antoine Dubarry (1674–1744), a captain in the régiment d'Île de France, and his wife Marguerite Catherine Cécile Thérèse de La Caze (died 1784), who he had married in 1722. His dissolute life and lack of scruples gained him the nickname "Le Roué" In 1748 he married Ursule Damas de Vernongrese then Anne de Rabaudy de Montoussin. From his first marriage he had son Adolphe Dubarry (1749–1778).

Louis XV had already begun falling in love with Bécu at the time of her marriage, through which Jean-Baptiste aimed to have her officially presented at court. This was successful and she was able to become the king's official favourite. For turning a blind eye to the affair and following complicated negotiations and fictitious exchanges, Guillaume was granted the comté de L'Isle-Jourdain and major estates in eastern Gascony, whilst Jean-Baptiste himself was granted the vidame of Châlons en Champagne and its revenue. On the king's death in 1774, despite being Madame du Barry's brother-in-law, Jean-Baptiste had to leave the royal court and returned to Toulouse. Madame du Barry did not go with him or return to her husband - following a "letter du cachet" from the new king Louis XVI she was forced to stay in a convent before gaining royal approval to return to her château in Louveciennes.

Between 1777 and 1778 Jean-Baptiste bought two houses in Toulouse on place Saint-Raymond (now 1 place Saint-Sernin) and many plots between Rue de la Chaîne (now 8–12) and Rue Royale (now Rue Gatien-Arnoult) on which he built the Hôtel Dubarry. When the French Revolution broke out in 1789 he joined the National Guard and became colonel of the Saint-Sernin legion. However, he was then arrested as a suspect in 1793, with Madame du Barry also arrested and imprisoned on 22 September that year. She was guillotined on place de la Révolution (now Place de la Concorde) on 8 December that year, with the same fate befalling Jean-Baptiste on 17 January 1794 in place de la Liberté (now Place du Capitole) in Toulouse. By contrast, Guillaume died 17 years later in 1811, aged 79.
